= Continuance of Laws (No. 2) Act 1796 =

Act of the Parliament of Great Britain

- Act of Parliament
- Parliament of Great Britain
- Long title: An act to continue several laws, therein-mentioned, relating to the better encouragement of the making of sail cloth in Great Britain, to the encouraging the manufacture of British sail cloth, and securing the duties on foreign fail cloth imported; to securing the duties upon foreign made sail cloth, and charging foreign made sails with a duty; and to the allowing a bounty on the exportation of British made cordage.
- Citation: 36 Geo. 3. c. 108
- Territorial extent: Great Britain

Dates
- Royal assent: 18 May 1796
- Commencement: 18 May 1796 (Note: The Acts of Parliament (Commencement) Act 1793.)
- Repealed: 21 August 1871
Other legislation
Amends	See § Continued enactments
Repealed by	Statute Law Revision Act 1871
Relates to	See Expiring laws continuance acts

Status: Repealed

Text of statute as originally enacted

The Continuance of Laws (No. 2) Act 1796 (36 Geo. 3. c. 108) was an act of the Parliament of Great Britain that continued various older acts.

== Background ==
In the United Kingdom, acts of Parliament remain in force until expressly repealed. Many acts of parliament, however, contained time-limited sunset clauses, requiring legislation to revive enactments that had expired or to continue enactments that would otherwise expire.

This was the first expiring laws continuance act passed following the report of the Select Committee on Temporary Laws, Expired or Expiring on 12 May 1796, which inspected and considered all the temporary laws, observed irregularities in the construction of expiring laws continuance acts, made recommendations and emphasised the importance of the Committee for Expired and Expiring Laws.

== Provisions ==
=== Continued enactments ===
Section 1 of the act continued the Sail Cloth Act 1759 (33 Geo. 2. c. 17), as continued by the Customs Act 1768 (8 Geo. 3. c. 23), the Continuance of Laws (No. 2) Act 1774 (14 Geo. 3. c. 80), the Continuance of Laws Act 1782 (22 Geo. 3. c. 13) and the Continuance of Laws Act 1789 (29 Geo. 3. c. 55), from the expiration of the act until the end of the next session of parliament after 29 September 1799.

Section 2 of the act continued the Manufacture of Sail Cloth Act 1735 (9 Geo. 2. c. 37), as continued by the Continuance of Laws, etc. Act 1739 (13 Geo. 2. c. 28), the Continuance of Laws Act 1750 (24 Geo. 2. c. 52), the Passage from Charing Cross Act 1757 (31 Geo. 2. c. 36), the Continuance of Laws Act 1763 (4 Geo. 3. c. 11), the Continuance of Certain Laws Act 1772 (12 Geo. 3. c. 56), the Continuance of Laws Act 1778 (18 Geo. 3. c. 45) and the Continuance of Laws Act 1786 (26 Geo. 3. c. 53), as amended and continued by the British Sailcloth, etc. Act 1793 (33 Geo. 3. c. 49), from the expiration of the act until the end of the next session of parliament after 29 September 1799.

Section 3 of the act continued the continued the Sail Cloth Act 1745 (19 Geo. 2. c. 27), as continued by the Continuance of Laws, etc. Act 1753 (26 Geo. 2. c. 32), the Continuance of Laws Act 1758 (32 Geo. 2. c. 23), the Continuance of Laws Act 1766 (6 Geo. 3. c. 44), the Continuance of Laws (No. 2) Act 1774 (14 Geo. 3. c. 80), the Continuance of Laws Act 1782 (22 Geo. 3. c. 13) and the Continuance of Laws Act 1789 (29 Geo. 3. c. 55), from the expiration of the act until the end of the next session of parliament after 29 September 1799.

Section 4 of the act continued the Bounty of Exportation Act 1766 (6 Geo. 3. c. 45), as amended and continued by the Customs (No. 2) Act 1772 (12 Geo. 3. c. 60), as continued by the Continuance of Laws, etc. Act 1774 (14 Geo. 3. c. 86) and as revived, amended and continued by the Bounty on Cordage Exported Act 1786 (26 Geo. 3. c. 85) as relates to allowing a Bounty on the Exportation of British made Cordage, until the end of the next session of parliament after 4 years from the expiration of those enactments.

== Subsequent developments ==
The whole act was repealed by section 1 of, and the schedule to, the Statute Law Revision Act 1871 (34 & 35 Vict. c. 116), which came into force on 21 August 1871.
