= Continuance of Laws Act 1798 =

Act of the Parliament of Great Britain

- Act of Parliament
- Parliament of Great Britain
- Long title: An act to continue several laws relating to the granting a bounty on certain species of British and Irish linens exported, and taking off the duties on the importation of foreign raw linen yarns made of flax, until June 24, 1799; to the permitting the exportation of tobacco pipe clay from this kingdom to the British sugar colonies or plantations in the West Indies, until June 24, 1802; to the allowing the importation of rape seed, and other seeds used for extracting oil, whenever the prices of middling British rape seed shall be above a certain limit, until June 24, 1799; to the further support and encouragement of the fisheries carried on in the Greenland seas and Davis's streights, until Dec. 25, 1799; to the more effectual encouragement of the manufactures of flax and cotton in Great Britain, until June 24, 1799; to the ascertaining the strength of spirits by Clarke's hydrometer, until June 1, 1801; and so much of an act, made in the thirty-fifth year of the reign of his present Majesty, for better securing the duties on glass, as was to continue for a limited time, until July 5, 1799.
- Citation: 38 Geo. 3. c. 35
- Territorial extent: Great Britain

Dates
- Royal assent: 5 April 1798
- Commencement: 5 April 1798 (Note: The Acts of Parliament (Commencement) Act 1793.)
- Repealed: 21 August 1871
Other legislation
Amends	See § Continued enactments
Repealed by	Statute Law Revision Act 1871
Relates to	See Expiring laws continuance acts

Status: Repealed

Text of statute as originally enacted

The Continuance of Laws Act 1798 (38 Geo. 3. c. 35) was an act of the Parliament of Great Britain that continued various older acts.

== Background ==
In the United Kingdom, acts of Parliament remain in force until expressly repealed. Many acts of parliament, however, contained time-limited sunset clauses, requiring legislation to revive enactments that had expired or to continue enactments that would otherwise expire.

The Select Committee on Temporary Laws, Expired or Expiring reported on 12 May 1796, which inspected and considered all the temporary laws, observed irregularities in the construction of expiring laws continuance acts, made recommendations and emphasised the importance of the Committee for Expired and Expiring Laws.

== Provisions ==
=== Continued enactments ===
Section 1 of the act continued the Exportation Act 1756 (29 Geo. 2. c. 15), as continued by the Exportation (No. 4) Act 1770 (10 Geo. 3. c. 38), the Bounties Act 1779 (19 Geo. 3. c. 27), the Continuance of Laws Act 1787 (27 Geo. 3. c. 36), the Continuance of Laws (No. 2) Act 1788 (28 Geo. 3. c. 24), the Continuance of Laws, etc. Act 1791 (31 Geo. 3. c. 43), the Continuance of Laws Act 1793 (33 Geo. 3. c. 40), the Continuance of Laws Act 1795 (35 Geo. 3. c. 38) and the Continuance of Laws Act 1796 (36 Geo. 3. c. 40), until 24 June 1799.

Section 2 of the act continued the Customs (No. 6) Act 1776 (17 Geo. 3. c. 43) "as permits the exportation of tobacco-pipe clay from this kingdom to the British sugar colonies or plantations in the West Indies", as continued by the Continuance of Laws (No. 2) Act 1780 (20 Geo. 3. c. 19), the Continuance of Laws Act 1783 (23 Geo. 3. c. 6), the Continuance of Laws Act 1788 (28 Geo. 3. c. 23) and the Continuance of Laws Act 1793 (33 Geo. 3. c. 40), until 24 June 1802.

Section 3 of the act continued the Importation (No. 4) Act 1795 (35 Geo. 3. c. 117), as continued by the Continuance of Laws Act 1796 (36 Geo. 3. c. 40), until 24 June 1799.

Section 4 of the act continued the Fisheries Act 1786 (26 Geo. 3. c. 41) and so much of the Whale Fisheries Act 1789 (29 Geo. 3. c. 53) "as relates to the Fisheries carried on the Greenland Seas, and Davis's Streights", as amended and continued by the Fishery Act 1792 (32 Geo. 3. c. 22), until 25 December 1799.

Section 5 of the act continued the Flax, etc., Manufacture Act 1783 (23 Geo. 3. c. 77), as continued by the Continuance of Laws Act 1786 (26 Geo. 3. c. 53), the Continuance of Laws Act 1788 (28 Geo. 3. c. 23), the Flax and Cotton Manufactures Act 1789 (29 Geo. 3. c. 54), the Continuance of Laws Act 1793 (33 Geo. 3. c. 40) and the Continuance of Laws Act 1796 (36 Geo. 3. c. 40), until 24 June 1799.

Section 6 of the act continued the Exports Act 1787 (27 Geo. 3. c. 31) "as directs that all Spirits shall be deemed and taken to be of the Degree of Strength as Which the Hydrometer, commonly called Clarke's Hydrometer, shall, upon Trial of any Officer or Officers of Excise, denote any such Spirits to be", as continued by several previous acts, until 1 June 1801.

Section 7 of the act continued the Duties on Glass Act 1795 (35 Geo. 3. c. 114), as continued by the Continuance of Laws Act 1797 (37 Geo. 3. c. 99), until 5 July 1799.

== Subsequent developments ==
The whole act was repealed by section 1 of, and the schedule to, the Statute Law Revision Act 1871 (34 & 35 Vict. c. 116), which came into force on 21 August 1871.
