= Growth of Coffee, etc. Act 1751 =

Act of the Parliament of Great Britain

- Act of Parliament
- Parliament of Great Britain
- Long title: An Act for continuing the Act for encouraging the Growth of Coffee in His Majesty's Plantations in America, and also for continuing, under certain Regulations, so much of an Act as relates to the Premiums upon the Importation of Masts, Yards, and Bowsprits, Tar, Pitch, and Turpentine.
- Citation: 25 Geo. 2. c. 35
- Territorial extent: Great Britain

Dates
- Royal assent: 26 March 1752
- Commencement: 14 November 1751 (Note: Start of session.)
- Repealed: 15 July 1867
Other legislation
Amends	Growth of Coffee Act 1731; Preservation of Woods, America Act 1728
Repealed by	Statute Law Revision Act 1867
Relates to	Continuance of Laws Act 1737; Growth of Coffee Act 1745; Continuance of Laws Act 1758; Continuance of Laws Act 1766; Continuance of Laws, etc. Act 1774; Continuance of Laws Act 1781; Continuance of Laws Act 1788; Continuance of Laws Act 1796

Status: Repealed

Text of statute as originally enacted

The Growth of Coffee, etc. Act 1751 (25 Geo. 2. c. 35) was an act of the Parliament of Great Britain that continued various older acts.

== Background ==
In the United Kingdom, acts of Parliament remain in force until expressly repealed. Many acts of parliament, however, contained time-limited sunset clauses, requiring legislation to revive enactments that had expired or to continue enactments that would otherwise expire.

== Provisions ==
=== Continued enactments ===
Section 1 of the act continued the Growth of Coffee Act 1731 (5 Geo. 2. c. 24) as continued by the Continuance of Laws Act 1737 (11 Geo. 2. c. 18) and the Growth of Coffee Act 1745 (19 Geo. 2. c. 23), from the expiration of the act until the end of the next session of parliament after 25 March 1758.

Section 2 of the act continued the Preservation of Woods, America Act 1728 (2 Geo. 2. c. 35) "as relates to the Premiums upon malts, yards, and bowsprits, tar, pitch and turpentine", as continued by the Continuance of Laws, etc. Act 1739 (13 Geo. 2. c. 28) and the Continuance of Laws Act 1750 (24 Geo. 2. c. 52), from the expiration of those enactments until the end of the next session of parliament after 25 March 1758.

Section 3 of the act provided that no bounty should be paid on tar unless each barrel contained thirty-one and a half gallons, and that surveying officers must not survey barrels until all water had been drained off and the barrels were filled with tar.

== Subsequent developments ==
The Select Committee on Temporary Laws, Expired or Expiring, appointed in 1796, inspected and considered all the temporary laws, observed irregularities in the construction of expiring laws continuance acts, making recommendations and emphasising the importance of the Committee for Expired and Expiring Laws.

The whole act was repealed by section 1 of, and the schedule to, the Statute Law Revision Act 1867 (30 & 31 Vict. c. 59).
