= Continuance of Certain Laws Act 1772 =

Act of the Parliament of Great Britain

- Act of Parliament
- Parliament of Great Britain
- Long title: An Act to continue several Laws relating to the Allowance upon the Exportation of British-made Gunpowder; to the giving further Encouragement for the Importation of Naval Stores from the British Colonies in America; to the further encouraging the Manufacture of British Sail Cloth, and to the Duties payable on Foreign Sail Cloth; to the granting a Liberty to carry Sugars of the Growth, Produce, or Manufacture of any of His Majesty’s Sugar Colonies directly into Foreign Parts in Ships built in Great Britain, and navigated according to Law; to the free Importation of Cattle from Ireland; and to the regulating the Fees of Officers of the Customs and Naval Officers in America.
- Citation: 12 Geo. 3. c. 56
- Territorial extent: Great Britain

Dates
- Royal assent: 3 June 1772
- Commencement: 21 January 1772 (Note: Start of session.)
- Repealed: 21 August 1871

Other legislation
- Amends: See § Continued enactments
- Repealed by: Statute Law Revision Act 1871
- Relates to: See Expiring laws continuance acts

Status: Repealed

Text of statute as originally enacted

The Continuance of Certain Laws Act 1772 (12 Geo. 3. c. 56) was an act of the Parliament of Great Britain that continued various older acts.

== Background ==
In the United Kingdom, acts of Parliament remain in force until expressly repealed. Many acts of parliament, however, contained time-limited sunset clauses, requiring legislation to revive enactments that had expired or to continue enactments that would otherwise expire.

== Provisions ==
=== Continued enactments ===
Section 1 of the act continued the Exportation Act 1730 (4 Geo. 2. c. 29), as continued by the Customs, etc. Act 1736 (10 Geo. 2. c. 27), the Continuance of Laws, etc. Act 1742 (16 Geo. 2. c. 26), the Continuance of Laws Act 1750 (24 Geo. 2. c. 52), the Passage from Charing Cross Act 1757 (31 Geo. 2. c. 36) and the Continuance of Laws Act 1763 (4 Geo. 3. c. 11), from the expiration of the act until the end of the next session of parliament after 29 September 1778.

Section 2 of the act continued the Importation Act 1721 (8 Geo. 1. c. 12) "as relates to the importation of wood and timber, and of the goods commonly known as Lumber, therein particularly enumerated, from any of His Majesty's British plantations or colonies in America, free from all customs and impositions whatsoever", as continued by the Continuance of Laws, etc. Act 1742 (16 Geo. 2. c. 26), the Continuance of Laws Act 1750 (24 Geo. 2. c. 52), the Continuance of Laws, etc., (No. 2) Act 1757 (31 Geo. 2. c. 35) and the Continuance of Laws Act 1763 (4 Geo. 3. c. 11), from the expiration of the act until the end of the next session of parliament after 29 September 1778.

Section 3 of the act continued the Manufacture of Sail Cloth Act 1735 (9 Geo. 2. c. 37), as continued by the Continuance of Laws, etc. Act 1739 (13 Geo. 2. c. 28), the Continuance of Laws Act 1750 (24 Geo. 2. c. 52), the Passage from Charing Cross Act 1757 (31 Geo. 2. c. 36) and the Continuance of Laws Act 1763 (4 Geo. 3. c. 11), from the expiration of the act until the end of the next session of parliament after 29 September 1778.

Section 4 of the act continued the Colonial Trade Act 1738 (12 Geo. 2. c. 30), as continued by the Universities (Wine Licences) Act 1743 (17 Geo. 2. c. 40), the Continuance of Laws (No. 2) Act 1750 (24 Geo. 2. c. 57), the Continuance of Laws, etc., (No. 2) Act 1757 (31 Geo. 2. c. 35) and the Continuance of Laws Act 1763 (4 Geo. 3. c. 11), from the expiration of the act until the end of the next session of parliament after 29 September 1778.

Section 5 of the act continued the Importation (No. 3) Act 1765 (5 Geo. 3. c. 10) from the expiration of the act until the end of the next session of parliament after 1 August 1778.

Section 6 of the act continued the Making of Indigo, etc. Act 1770 (10 Geo. 3. c. 37), as relates to the Importation (No. 3) Act 1765 (5 Geo. 3. c. 10), from the expiration of the enactment until the end of the next session of parliament after 1 August 1774.

== Subsequent developments ==
The Select Committee on Temporary Laws, Expired or Expiring, appointed in 1796, inspected and considered all temporary laws, observing irregularities in the construction of expiring laws continuance acts, making recommendations and emphasising the importance of the Committee for Expired and Expiring Laws.

The whole act was repealed by section 1 of, and the schedule to, the Statute Law Revision Act 1871 (34 & 35 Vict. c. 116), which came into force on 21 August 1871.
