= Continuance of Laws Act 1795 =

Act of the Parliament of Great Britain

- Act of Parliament
- Parliament of Great Britain
- Long title: An Act to continue several Laws relating to the granting a bounty on certain Species of British and Irish Linens exported, and taking off the Duties on the Importation of foreign Raw, Linen Yarns made of Flax; to the discontinuing the Duties people on the Importation of Tallow, Hogs Lard and Grease; people on the Importation of Tallow, Hogs Lard and Grease; and to the prohibiting the Importation of foreign Wrought Silks and Velvets; and for making perpetual an Act made in the twenty fifth Year of the Reign of His present Majesty, to prohibit the Exportation of Tools and Utensils made use of in the Iron and Steel Manufactures of this kingdom; and to prevent the seducing of Artificers or Workmen employed in those Manufactures to go into Parts beyond the Seas.
- Citation: 35 Geo. 3. c. 38
- Territorial extent: Great Britain

Dates
- Royal assent: 28 April 1795
- Commencement: 28 April 1795 (Note: The Acts of Parliament (Commencement) Act 1793.)
- Repealed: 21 August 1871
Other legislation
Amends	See § Continued enactments
Repealed by	Statute Law Revision Act 1871
Relates to	See Expiring laws continuance acts

Status: Repealed

Text of statute as originally enacted

The Continuance of Laws Act 1795 (35 Geo. 3. c. 38) was an act of the Parliament of Great Britain that continued and made perpetual various older acts.

== Background ==
In the United Kingdom, acts of Parliament remain in force until expressly repealed. Many acts of parliament, however, contained time-limited sunset clauses, requiring legislation to revive enactments that had expired or to continue enactments that would otherwise expire.

== Provisions ==
=== Continued enactments ===
Section 1 of the act continued the Exportation Act 1756 (29 Geo. 2. c. 15), as continued by the Exportation (No. 4) Act 1770 (10 Geo. 3. c. 38), the Bounties Act 1779 (19 Geo. 3. c. 27), the Continuance of Laws Act 1787 (27 Geo. 3. c. 36), the Continuance of Laws (No. 2) Act 1788 (28 Geo. 3. c. 24), the Continuance of Laws, etc. Act 1791 (31 Geo. 3. c. 43) and the Continuance of Laws Act 1793 (33 Geo. 3. c. 40), from the expiration of the act until the end of the next session of parliament after 24 June 1796.

Section 2 of the act continued the Importation (No. 6) Act 1766 (7 Geo. 3. c. 12), as continued by the Discontinuance of Duties Act 1770 (10 Geo. 3. c. 8), the Importation and Exportation (No. 5) Act 1772 (13 Geo. 3. c. 5) the Customs Act 1776 (16 Geo. 3. c. 12), the Customs Act 1782 (22 Geo. 3. c. 20), the Continuance of Laws Act 1786 (26 Geo. 3. c. 53), the Continuance of Laws Act 1789 (29 Geo. 3. c. 55) and the Continuance of Laws Act 1792 (32 Geo. 3. c. 36), from the expiration of the act until the end of the next session of parliament after 25 March 1799.

Section 3 of the act continued the Importation, etc. Act 1766 (6 Geo. 3. c. 28) "as relates to the prohibiting the Importation of foreign-wrought Silks and Velvets", as continued by the Importation (No. 3) Act 1771 (11 Geo. 3. c. 49), the Importation (No. 3) Act 1776 (17 Geo. 3. c. 35), the Importation Act (No. 4) 1782 (22 Geo. 3. c. 72) and the Continuance of Laws Act 1789 (29 Geo. 3. c. 55), from the expiration of those enactments until the end of the next session of parliament after 14 June 1802.

Section 4 of the act made the Exportation (No. 4) Act 1786 (26 Geo. 3. c. 89), as continued by the Continuance of Laws Act 1787 (27 Geo. 3. c. 36), the Continuance of Laws Act 1788 (28 Geo. 3. c. 23), the Continuance of Laws Act 1789 (29 Geo. 3. c. 55), the Continuance of Laws Act 1790 (30 Geo. 3. c. 18), the Continuance of Laws, etc. Act 1791 (31 Geo. 3. c. 43), the Continuance of Laws Act 1792 (32 Geo. 3. c. 36) and the Continuance of Laws Act 1793 (33 Geo. 3. c. 40), perpetual.

== Subsequent developments ==
The Select Committee on Temporary Laws, Expired or Expiring, appointed in 1796, inspected and considered all temporary laws, observing irregularities in the construction of expiring laws continuance acts, making recommendations and emphasising the importance of the Committee for Expired and Expiring Laws.

The whole act was repealed by section 1 of, and the schedule to, the Statute Law Revision Act 1861 (24 & 25 Vict. c. 101), which came into force on 6 August 1861.
