= Continuance of Laws Act 1792 =

Act of the Parliament of Great Britain

- Act of Parliament
- Parliament of Great Britain
- Long title: An Act to continue several Laws therein mentioned, relating to the discontinuing the Duties payable upon the Importation of Tallow, Hog's Lard, and Grease; to the free Importation of certain Raw Hides and Skins from Ireland and the British Plantations in America; to the prohibiting the Exportation of Tools and Utensils made use of in the Iron and Steel Manufactures of this Kingdom, and to prevent the seducing of Artificers and Workmen employed in those Manufactures to go into Parts beyond the Seas; to the better regulating of Pilots for the conducting of Ships and Vessels from Dover, Deal, and the Isle of Thanet; to the ascertaining the Strength of Spirits by Clarke's Hydrometer; and to the allowing the Importation of Seal Skins cured with foreign Salt, free of Duty.
- Citation: 32 Geo. 3. c. 36
- Territorial extent: Great Britain

Dates
- Royal assent: 8 May 1792
- Commencement: 31 January 1792 (Note: Start of session.)
- Repealed: 21 August 1871

Other legislation
- Amends: See § Continued enactments
- Repealed by: Statute Law Revision Act 1871
- Relates to: See Expiring laws continuance acts

Status: Repealed

Text of statute as originally enacted

The Continuance of Laws Act 1792 (32 Geo. 3. c. 36) was an act of the Parliament of Great Britain that continued various older acts.

== Background ==
In the United Kingdom, acts of Parliament remain in force until expressly repealed. Many acts of parliament, however, contained time-limited sunset clauses, requiring legislation to revive enactments that had expired or to continue enactments that would otherwise expire.

== Provisions ==
=== Continued enactments ===
Section 1 of the act continued the Importation (No. 6) Act 1766 (7 Geo. 3. c. 12), as continued by the Discontinuance of Duties Act 1770 (10 Geo. 3. c. 8), the Importation and Exportation (No. 5) Act 1772 (13 Geo. 3. c. 5) the Customs Act 1776 (16 Geo. 3. c. 12), the Customs Act 1782 (22 Geo. 3. c. 20), the Continuance of Laws Act 1786 (26 Geo. 3. c. 53) and the Continuance of Laws Act 1789 (29 Geo. 3. c. 55), from the expiration of the act until the end of the next session of parliament after 25 March 1794.

Section 2 of the act continued the until the Hides and Skins Act 1769 (9 Geo. 3. c. 39) "as relates to the free importation of certain raw hides and skins from Ireland, and the British plantations in America", as continued by the Continuance of Laws, etc. Act 1774 (14 Geo. 3. c. 86), the Continuance of Laws Act 1781 (21 Geo. 3. c. 29) and the Continuance of Laws Act 1787 (27 Geo. 3. c. 36), from the expiration of those enactments until the end of the next session of parliament after 1 June 1796.

Section 3 of the act continued the Exportation (No. 4) Act 1786 (26 Geo. 3. c. 89), as continued by the Continuance of Laws Act 1787 (27 Geo. 3. c. 36), the Continuance of Laws Act 1788 (28 Geo. 3. c. 23), the Continuance of Laws Act 1789 (29 Geo. 3. c. 55), the Continuance of Laws Act 1790 (30 Geo. 3. c. 18) and the Continuance of Laws, etc. Act 1791 (31 Geo. 3. c. 43), until the end of the next session of parliament.

Section 4 of the act continued the Pilotage Act 1716 (3 Geo. 1. c. 13) and section 14 of the Trade to East Indies, etc. Act 1720 (7 Geo. 1. St. 1. c. 21), as continued by the Continuance of Laws, etc. Act 1723 (10 Geo. 1. c. 17) and the Continuance of Laws (No. 2) Act 1734 (8 Geo. 2. c. 21), the Continuance of Laws, etc. Act 1749 (23 Geo. 2. c. 26), the Continuance of Laws (No. 2) Act 1763 (4 Geo. 3. c. 12) and the Continuance of Laws Act 1778 (18 Geo. 3. c. 45), from the expiration of those enactments until the end of the next session of parliament after 25 March 1806.

Section 5 of the act continued the Exports Act 1787 (27 Geo. 3. c. 31) "as directs that all Spirits shall be deemed and taken to be of the Degree of Strength as Which the Hydrometer, commonly called Clarke's Hydrometer, shall, upon Trial of any Officer or Officers of Excise, denote any such Spirits to be", as continued by the Continuance of Laws Act 1788 (28 Geo. 3. c. 23), the Continuance of Laws Act 1789 (29 Geo. 3. c. 55), the Continuance of Laws Act 1790 (30 Geo. 3. c. 18) and the Ascertaining of Strength of Spirits Act 1791 (31 Geo. 3. c. 44), until the end of the next session of parliament.

Section 6 of the act continued the Customs Act 1791 (31 Geo. 3. c. 26) until the end of the next session of parliament after 14 June 1798.

== Subsequent developments ==
The Select Committee on Temporary Laws, Expired or Expiring, appointed in 1796, inspected and considered all temporary laws, observing irregularities in the construction of expiring laws continuance acts, making recommendations and emphasising the importance of the Committee for Expired and Expiring Laws.

The whole act was repealed by section 1 of, and the schedule to, the Statute Law Revision Act 1871 (34 & 35 Vict. c. 116), which came into force on 21 August 1871.
