= Continuance of Laws Act 1794 =

Act of the Parliament of Great Britain

- Act of Parliament
- Parliament of Great Britain
- Long title: An Act to continue several Laws relating to the Exportation of Culm to Lisbon, and to the ascertaining the Strength of Spirits by Clarke's Hydrometer.
- Citation: 34 Geo. 3. c. 36
- Territorial extent: Great Britain

Dates
- Royal assent: 17 April 1794
- Commencement: 17 April 1794 (Note: The Acts of Parliament (Commencement) Act 1793.)
- Repealed: 21 August 1871
Other legislation
Amends	See § Continued enactments
Repealed by	Statute Law Revision Act 1871
Relates to	See Expiring laws continuance acts

Status: Repealed

Text of statute as originally enacted

The Continuance of Laws Act 1794 (34 Geo. 3. c. 36) was an act of the Parliament of Great Britain that continued various older acts.

== Background ==
In the United Kingdom, acts of Parliament remain in force until expressly repealed. Many acts of parliament, however, contained time-limited sunset clauses, requiring legislation to revive enactments that had expired or to continue enactments that would otherwise expire.

== Provisions ==
=== Continued enactments ===
Section 1 of the act continued the Exportation (No. 3) Act 1757 (31 Geo. 2. c. 15) and the Importation and Exportation (No. 7) Act 1772 (13 Geo. 3. c. 70) "for and in respect of all Culm which shall be exported under the Regulations and Restrictions in the said Acts respectively mentioned", from the expiration of those enactments until the end of the next session of parliament after 25 March 1795.

Section 2 of the act continued the Exports Act 1787 (27 Geo. 3. c. 31) "as directs that all Spirits shall be deemed and taken to be of the Degree of Strength as Which the Hydrometer, commonly called Clarke's Hydrometer, shall, upon Trial of any Officer or Officers of Excise, denote any such Spirits to be", as continued by the Continuance of Laws Act 1788 (28 Geo. 3. c. 23), the Continuance of Laws Act 1789 (29 Geo. 3. c. 55), the Continuance of Laws Act 1790 (30 Geo. 3. c. 18), the Ascertaining of Strength of Spirits Act 1791 (31 Geo. 3. c. 44), the Continuance of Laws Act 1792 (32 Geo. 3. c. 36) and the Continuance of Laws Act 1793 (33 Geo. 3. c. 40), until the end of the next session of parliament.

== Subsequent developments ==
The Select Committee on Temporary Laws, Expired or Expiring, appointed in 1796, inspected and considered all temporary laws, observing irregularities in the construction of expiring laws continuance acts, making recommendations and emphasising the importance of the Committee for Expired and Expiring Laws.

The whole act was repealed by section 1 of, and the schedule to, the Statute Law Revision Act 1871 (34 & 35 Vict. c. 116), which came into force on 21 August 1871.
