= Continuance of Laws Act 1763 =

Act of the Parliament of Great Britain

- Act of Parliament
- Parliament of Great Britain
- Long title: An Act for continuing certain Laws therein mentioned, relating to British Sail-cloth, and to the Duties payable on Foreign Sail-cloth, and to the Allowance upon the Exportation of British made Gunpowder; and for giving further Encouragement for the Importation of Naval Stores from the British Colonies in America.
- Citation: 4 Geo. 3. c. 11
- Territorial extent: Great Britain

Dates
- Royal assent: 5 April 1764
- Commencement: 15 November 1763 (Note: Start of session.)
- Repealed: 15 July 1867
Other legislation
Amends	See § Continued enactments
Repealed by	Statute Law Revision Act 1867
Relates to	See Expiring laws continuance acts

Status: Repealed

Text of statute as originally enacted

The Continuance of Laws Act 1763 (4 Geo. 3. c. 11) was an act of the Parliament of Great Britain that continued various older enactments.

== Background ==
In the United Kingdom, acts of Parliament remain in force until expressly repealed. Many acts of parliament, however, contained time-limited sunset clauses, requiring legislation to revive enactments that had expired or to continue enactments that would otherwise expire.

== Provisions ==
=== Continued enactments ===
Section 1 of the act continued the Manufacture of Sail Cloth Act 1735 (9 Geo. 2. c. 37), as continued by the Continuance of Laws, etc. Act 1739 (13 Geo. 2. c. 28), the Continuance of Laws Act 1750 (24 Geo. 2. c. 52) and the Passage from Charing Cross Act 1757 (31 Geo. 2. c. 36), from the expiration of the act until the end of the next session of parliament after 29 September 1771.

Section 2 of the act continued the Exportation Act 1730 (4 Geo. 2. c. 29), as continued by the Customs, etc. Act 1736 (10 Geo. 2. c. 27), the Continuance of Laws, etc. Act 1742 (16 Geo. 2. c. 26), the Continuance of Laws Act 1750 (24 Geo. 2. c. 52) and the Passage from Charing Cross Act 1757 (31 Geo. 2. c. 36), from the expiration of the act until the end of the next session of parliament after 29 September 1771.

Section 3 of the act continued the Importation Act 1721 (8 Geo. 1. c. 12) "as relates to the importation of wood and timber, and of the goods commonly known as Lumber, therein particularly enumerated, from any of His Majesty's British plantations or colonies in America, free from all customs and impositions whatsoever", as continued by the Continuance of Laws, etc. Act 1742 (16 Geo. 2. c. 26), the Continuance of Laws Act 1750 (24 Geo. 2. c. 52) and the Continuance of Laws, etc., (No. 2) Act 1757 (31 Geo. 2. c. 35), from the expiration of the act until the end of the next session of parliament after 29 September 1771.

== Subsequent developments ==
The Select Committee on Temporary Laws, Expired or Expiring, appointed in 1796, inspected and considered all temporary laws, observing irregularities in the construction of expiring laws continuance acts, making recommendations and emphasising the importance of the Committee for Expired and Expiring Laws.

The whole act was repealed by section 1 of, and the schedule to, the Statute Law Revision Act 1867 (30 & 31 Vict. c. 59).
