= Passage from Charing Cross Act 1757 =

Act of the Parliament of Great Britain

- Act of Parliament
- Parliament of Great Britain
- Long title: An Act for continuing certain Laws therein mentioned, relating to British Sail Cloth, and to the Duties payable on Foreign Sail Cloth; and to the Allowance upon the Exportation of British made Gun-powder; and to the Encouragement of the Trade of the Sugar Colonies in America; and to the landing of Rum or Spirits of the British Sugar Plantations, before the Duties of Excise are paid thereon; and for regulating the Payment of the Duties on Foreign Exciseable Liquors; and for the Relief of Thomas Watson, with regard to the Drawback on certain East India Callicoes; and for rendering more commodious the new Passage leading from Charing Cross.
- Citation: 31 Geo. 2. c. 36
- Territorial extent: Great Britain

Dates
- Royal assent: 20 June 1758
- Commencement: 1 December 1757 (Note: Start of session.)
- Repealed: 31 January 2013
Other legislation
Amends	See § Continued enactments
Repealed by	Statute Law (Repeals) Act 2013
Relates to	See Expiring laws continuance acts

Status: Repealed

Text of statute as originally enacted

The Passage from Charing Cross Act 1757 (31 Geo. 2. c. 36) was an act of the Parliament of Great Britain that continued various older acts.

== Background ==
In the United Kingdom, acts of Parliament remain in force until expressly repealed. Many acts of parliament, however, contained time-limited sunset clauses, requiring legislation to revive enactments that had expired or to continue enactments that would otherwise expire.

== Provisions ==
=== Continued enactments ===
Section 1 of the act continued the Manufacture of Sail Cloth Act 1735 (9 Geo. 2. c. 37), as continued by the Continuance of Laws, etc. Act 1739 (13 Geo. 2. c. 28) and the Continuance of Laws Act 1750 (24 Geo. 2. c. 52), from the expiration of the act until the end of the next session of parliament after 29 September 1764.

Section 2 of the act continued the Exportation Act 1730 (4 Geo. 2. c. 29), as continued by the Customs, etc. Act 1736 (10 Geo. 2. c. 27) , the Continuance of Laws, etc. Act 1742 (16 Geo. 2. c. 26) and the Continuance of Laws Act 1750 (24 Geo. 2. c. 52), from the expiration of the act until the end of the next session of parliament after 29 September 1764.

Section 3 of the act continued the Trade of Sugar Colonies Act 1732 (6 Geo. 2. c. 13), as continued by the Continuance of Laws Act 1737 (11 Geo. 2. c. 18), the Growth of Coffee Act 1745 (19 Geo. 2. c. 23), the Continuance of Laws, etc. Act 1753 (26 Geo. 2. c. 32) and the Sugar Colonies, etc. Act 1756 (29 Geo. 2. c. 26), until the end of the next session of parliament after 29 September 1761.

Section 4 of the act continued the Spirit Duties, etc. Act 1741 (15 Geo. 2. c. 25) as relates "to the landing of rum or spirits of the British sugar plantations, before payment of the duties of excise, and to the lodging of the same in warehouses at the expence of the importers or proprietors thereof", as continued by the Continuance of Laws, etc. Act 1749 (23 Geo. 2. c. 26), from the expiration of those enactments until the end of the next session of parliament after 29 September 1764.

Section 5 of the act provided that foreign excisable liquors brought into Great Britain shall be landed and lodged in warehouses appointed by customs officers, with the importer required to give security for duties before landing, and that duties on such liquors imported or exported shall be collected by customs officers according to the same regulations as domestic excisable liquors, with penalties for violations including forfeiture of goods and vessels.

Section 6 of the act provided that during the continuance of the Spirit Duties, etc. Act 1741 (15 Geo. 2. c. 25), nothing in the last mentioned clause shall extend to prevent or hinder the proprietors, importers, of any rum or spirits of the growth, produce, or manufacture of the British sugar plantations from being imported into Great Britain directly from the said sugar plantations, provided such rum or spirits are landed and put into warehouses with security given for duties within thirty days as directed by that act.

Section 7 of the act provided that in all entries or reports of foreign liquors liable to excise duties, the master or purser of any ship or vessel must insert the number of casks or other packages with their particular numbers and marks and the particular kind of liquor contained in each, on pain of forfeiting such liquor and package for every neglect or refusal, with seized goods to be divided between his Majesty and the seizer after deducting recovery charges.

Section 8 of the act provided that it shall be lawful for gaugers or officers of the excise to take a sample or samples (not exceeding one quart in the whole) out of each of the casks or other packages containing foreign spirituous liquors, paying for such samples at the rate of sixteen shillings per gallon, in order to better ascertain the proof of all foreign imported liquors liable to excise duties.

Section 9 of the act provided that for the relief of Thomas Watson of Morris's Causeway in the parish of Lambeth in the county of Surrey, callicoe printer, whose 2,755 pieces of printed East India callicoes worth £2,249 15s 11d were destroyed by fire on the 8 September 1755 and were intended for export, the collector or other proper officer at the port of London shall make out and grant a proper debenture for the said callicoes, entitling Thomas Watson to draw back the duties paid on the importation thereof as would have been drawn back upon exportation.

Section 10 of the act provided that the passage called "The New Passage" leading from Charing Cross into St James's Park shall be deemed one of the ways, streets, avenues, or passages within the description of the Westminster Bridge Act 1756 (29 Geo. 2. c. 38), and that the said commissioners or any five or more of them are empowered to widen and render safe and commodious for carriages and passengers on foot the said passage, as fully and effectually as they are authorised to open and widen any streets, avenues, or passages leading from Charing Cross to Westminster Hall and Westminster Bridge.

Section 11 of the act that any remaining money after opening and widening ways from Charing Cross to Westminster shall be applied by the commissioners towards opening, widening, and rendering safe The New Passage leading from Charing Cross into St James's Park.

== Subsequent developments ==
The Select Committee on Temporary Laws, Expired or Expiring, appointed in 1796, inspected and considered all temporary laws, observing irregularities in the construction of expiring laws continuance acts, making recommendations and emphasising the importance of the Committee for Expired and Expiring Laws.

The whole act was repealed by section 1 of, and the group 2 of part 6 of the schedule to, the Statute Law (Repeals) Act 2013, which came into force on 31 January 2013.
