= Growth of Coffee Act 1745 =

Act of the Parliament of Great Britain

- Act of Parliament
- Parliament of Great Britain
- Long title: An Act to continue Two Acts of Parliament; One, for encouraging the Growth of Coffee in His Majesty's Plantations in America; and the other, for the better securing and encouraging the Trade of His Majesty's Sugar Colonies in America.
- Citation: 19 Geo. 2. c. 23
- Territorial extent: Great Britain

Dates
- Royal assent: 4 June 1746
- Commencement: 17 October 1745 (Note: Start of session.)
- Repealed: 15 July 1867
Other legislation
Amends	Growth of Coffee Act 1731
Repealed by	Statute Law Revision Act 1867
Relates to	Continuance of Laws Act 1737; Growth of Coffee, etc. Act 1751; Continuance of Laws Act 1758; Continuance of Laws Act 1766; Continuance of Laws, etc. Act 1774; Continuance of Laws Act 1781; Continuance of Laws Act 1788; Continuance of Laws Act 1796

Status: Repealed

Text of statute as originally enacted

The Growth of Coffee Act 1745 (19 Geo. 2. c. 23) was an act of the Parliament of Great Britain that continued various older acts.

== Background ==
In the United Kingdom, acts of Parliament remain in force until expressly repealed. Many acts of parliament, however, contained time-limited sunset clauses, requiring legislation to revive enactments that had expired or to continue enactments that would otherwise expire.

== Provisions ==
=== Continued enactments ===
Section 1 of the act continued the Growth of Coffee Act 1731 (5 Geo. 2. c. 24) and the Trade of Sugar Colonies Act 1732 (6 Geo. 2. c. 13), as continued by the Continuance of Laws Act 1737 (11 Geo. 2. c. 18), until the end of the next session of parliament act after 7 years from the expiration of the act.

== Subsequent developments ==
The Select Committee on Temporary Laws, Expired or Expiring, appointed in 1796, inspected and considered all the temporary laws, observed irregularities in the construction of expiring laws continuance acts, making recommendations and emphasising the importance of the Committee for Expired and Expiring Laws.

The whole act was repealed by section 1 of, and the schedule to, the Statute Law Revision Act 1867 (30 & 31 Vict. c. 59), which came into force on 15 July 1867.
