= Continuance of Laws Act 1799 =

Continuance of Laws Act 1799 may refer to:

- Continuance of Laws Act 1799 (39 Geo. 3. c. 12), an act passed in the third session of the 18th Parliament of Great Britain
- Continuance of Laws Act 1799 (39 & 40 Geo. 3. c. 9), an act passed in the fourth session of the 18th Parliament of Great Britain
