= Continuance of Laws Act 1711 =

Act of the Parliament of Great Britain

- Act of Parliament
- Parliament of Great Britain
- Long title: An Act for the reviving and continuing several Acts therein mentioned, for the preventing Mischiefs which may happen by Fire; for building and repairing County Gaols; for exempting Apothecaries from serving Parish and Ward Offices, and serving upon Juries; and relating to the returning of Jurors.
- Citation: 10 Ann. c. 24 (Note: This is the citation in The Statutes of the Realm.); 10 Ann. c. 14 (Note: This is the citation in The Statutes at Large.)
- Territorial extent: Great Britain

Dates
- Royal assent: 22 May 1712
- Commencement: 7 December 1711 (Note: Start of session.)
- Repealed: 15 July 1867

Other legislation
- Amends: Exemptions of Apothecaries Act 1694; Juries Act 1695; Gaols Act 1698; Perpetuation and Amendment of Laws Act 1704; Mischiefs from Fire Act 1707
- Amended by: Perpetuation, etc. of Acts 1719; Continuance of Laws Act 1722
- Repealed by: Statute Law Revision Act 1867
- Relates to: See Expiring laws continuance acts

Status: Repealed

Text of statute as originally enacted

The Continuance of Laws Act 1711 (10 Ann. c. 24) was an act of the Parliament of Great Britain that revived and continued various older acts.

== Background ==
In the United Kingdom, acts of Parliament remain in force until expressly repealed. Many acts of parliament, however, contained time-limited sunset clauses, requiring legislation to revive enactments that had expired or to continue enactments that would otherwise expire.

== Provisions ==
=== Revived and continued enactments ===
Section 1 of the act revived the provisions in the Mischiefs from Fire Act 1707 (6 Ann. c. 58) that provided from 1 May that no legal action could be taken against a person in whose house a fire accidentally begins, nor could they be held liable for any damages caused by such fire, and made them perpetual.

Section 2 of the act continued the Gaols Act 1698 (11 Will. 3. c. 19) until the end of the next session of parliament 7 years from 1 May 1712.

Section 3 of the act continued the Exemptions of Apothecaries Act 1694 (6 & 7 Will. 3), as continued by the Apothecaries Act 1702 (1 Ann. c. 5), until the end of the next session of parliament 11 years from the expiry of that act (which was the end of the next session of parliament after 11 February 1712).

Section 4 of the act continued the clauses in the Perpetuation and Amendment of Laws Act 1704 (3 & 4 Ann. c. 16) relating to returns and services of juries until the end of the next session of parliament 11 years from the expiry of that act (which was provided by the Estreats (Personal Representatives) Act 1692 (4 & 5 Will. & Mar. 3), as continued by the Juries Act 1695 (7 & 8 Will. 3. c. 32) and the Continuance of Laws Act 1702 (1 Ann. Stat. 2. c. 13)).

Section 5 of the act extended section 17 of the Juries Act 1695 (7 & 8 Will. 3. c. 32) to clarify that the limitation on jury service (not more than once in four years) applied not only to Sessions of the Peace held for any of the Ridings within the County of York but also to any Sessions of the Peace held by Adjournment for any Part of the said Ridings or any of them.

Section 6 of the act provided that any person with an estate of the clear yearly value of £150 or greater who serves as a juror at any of the said Sessions or Adjournments shall not thereby be exempted from serving as a juror at the Assizes or general Goal Delivery for the County of York during the four-year term or any other term, notwithstanding anything contained in the previously recited acts or in the present act.

Section 7 of the act provided that nothing in the act would extend or repeal any powers or privileges granted to justices of the peace of the County of Devon by the Devon Public Stock Act 1710 (9 Ann. c. 10).

== Subsequent developments ==
So much of the act as relates to the building and repairing of county gaols (section 2) was made perpetual by section 1 of the Perpetuation, etc. of Acts 1719 (6 Geo. 1. c. 19).

So much of the act as relates to jurors, and to the returns and service of jurors was continued until the end of the next session of parliament after 3 years from the expiration of those enactments by the Continuance of Laws Act 1722 (9 Geo. 1. c. 8).

The Select Committee on Temporary Laws, Expired or Expiring, appointed in 1796, inspected and considered all temporary laws, observing irregularities in the construction of expiring laws continuance acts, making recommendations and emphasising the importance of the Committee for Expired and Expiring Laws.

The whole act was repealed by section 1 of, and the schedule to, the Statute Law Revision Act 1867 (30 & 31 Vict. c. 59), which came into force on 15 July 1867.
