= Continuance of Laws (No. 2) Act 1774 =

Act of the Parliament of Great Britain

- Act of Parliament
- Parliament of Great Britain
- Long title: An Act to continue the several Laws therein mentioned for the better Encouragement of the making of Sail Cloth in Great Britain; and for securing the Duties upon foreign-made Sail Cloth, and charging foreign-made Sails with a Duty.
- Citation: 14 Geo. 3. c. 80
- Territorial extent: Great Britain

Dates
- Royal assent: 14 June 1774
- Commencement: 13 January 1774 (Note: Start of session.)
- Repealed: 21 August 1871

Other legislation
- Amends: See § Continued enactments
- Repealed by: Statute Law Revision Act 1871
- Relates to: See Expiring laws continuance acts

Status: Repealed

Text of statute as originally enacted

The Continuance of Laws (No. 2) Act 1774 (14 Geo. 3. c. 80) was an act of the Parliament of Great Britain that continued various older acts.

== Background ==
In the United Kingdom, acts of Parliament remain in force until expressly repealed. Many acts of parliament, however, contained time-limited sunset clauses, requiring legislation to revive enactments that had expired or to continue enactments that would otherwise expire.

== Provisions ==
=== Continued enactments ===
Section 1 of the act continued the Sail Cloth Act 1759 (33 Geo. 2. c. 17), as continued by the Customs Act 1768 (8 Geo. 3. c. 23), from the expiration of the act until the end of the next session of parliament after 29 September 1781.

Section 2 continued the Sail Cloth Act 1745 (19 Geo. 2. c. 27), as continued by the Continuance of Laws, etc. Act 1753 (26 Geo. 2. c. 32), the Continuance of Laws Act 1758 (32 Geo. 2. c. 23) and the Continuance of Laws Act 1766 (6 Geo. 3. c. 44), from the expiration of the act until the end of the next session of parliament after 24 June 1781.

== Subsequent developments ==
The Select Committee on Temporary Laws, Expired or Expiring, appointed in 1796, inspected and considered all temporary laws, observing irregularities in the construction of expiring laws continuance acts, making recommendations and emphasising the importance of the Committee for Expired and Expiring Laws.

The whole act was repealed by section 1 of, and the schedule to, the Statute Law Revision Act 1871 (34 & 35 Vict. c. 116), which came into force on 21 August 1871.
