= Perpetuation, etc. of Acts 1719 =

Act of the Parliament of Great Britain

- Act of Parliament
- Parliament of Great Britain
- Long title: An Act for making perpetual so much of an Act made in the Tenth Year of the Reign of Queen Anne, for the reviving and continuing several Acts therein mentioned, as relates to the building and repairing County Gaols; and also an Act of the Eleventh and Twelfth Years of the Reign of King William the Third, for the more effectual Suppression of Piracy; and for making more effectual the Act of the Thirteenth Year of the Reign of King Charles the Second, intituled, "An Act for establishing Articles and Orders for the regulating and better Government of His Majesty's Ships of War, and Forces by Sea."
- Citation: 6 Geo. 1. c. 19
- Territorial extent: Great Britain

Dates
- Royal assent: 11 June 1720
- Commencement: 23 November 1719 (Note: Start of session.)
- Repealed: 15 July 1867
Other legislation
Amends	Piracy Act 1698; Continuance of Laws Act 1711
Amended by	Vagrants and Criminals Act 1787
Repealed by	Statute Law Revision Act 1867
Relates to	See Expiring laws continuance acts

Status: Repealed

Text of statute as originally enacted

The Perpetuation, etc. of Acts 1719 (6 Geo. 1. c. 19) was an act of the Parliament of Great Britain that made perpetual various older acts.

== Background ==
In the United Kingdom, acts of Parliament remain in force until expressly repealed. Many acts of parliament, however, contained time-limited sunset clauses, requiring legislation to revive enactments that had expired or to continue enactments that would otherwise expire.

== Provisions ==
Section 1 of the act made so much of the Continuance of Laws Act 1711 (10 Ann. c. 24) as relates to the building and repairing of county gaols (section 2) perpetual.

Section 2 of the act provided that it shall be lawful for justices of the peace within their respective jurisdictions to commit vagrants and other criminals, offenders etc. to the common gaol or house of correction, in addition to their powers under the Vagabonds (No. 2) Act 1597 (39 Eliz. 1. c. 17) and the Vagabonds Act 1609 (7 Jas. 1. c. 4).

Section 3 of the act made the Piracy Act 1698 (11 Will. 3. c. 12) perpetual.

== Legacy ==
The Select Committee on Temporary Laws, Expired or Expiring, appointed in 1796, inspected and considered all temporary laws, observing irregularities in the construction of expiring laws continuance acts, making recommendations and emphasising the importance of the Committee for Expired and Expiring Laws.

The whole act was repealed by section 1 of, and the schedule to, the Statute Law Revision Act 1867 (30 & 31 Vict. c. 59).
