= Continuance of Laws Act 1799 (39 Geo. 3. c. 12) =

Act of the Parliament of Great Britain

- Act of Parliament
- Parliament of Great Britain
- Long title: An act to continue, until the expiration of six weeks after the commencement of the next session of parliament, An act, passed in the thirty-fifth year of the reign of his present Majesty, chapter fifteen, videlicet, On the sixteenth day of March one thousand seven hundred and nine-five; and also an act, passed in the same year, chapter eighty, videlicet, On the twenty-second day of May one thousand seven hundred and ninety-five; and also another act, passed in the thirty-sixth year of his present Majesty, chapter seven-six, videlicet, relating to the admission of certain articles of merchandize in neutral ships, and the issuing of orders in council for that purpose; and to continue, for the same period, an act, passed in the session of parliament holden in the thirty-sixth and thirty-seventh years of his present Majesty, chapter twenty-one, videlicet, On the twenty-eighth day of December one thousand seven hundred and ninety-six, authorising his Majesty to make regulations respecting the trade and commerce to and from the Cape of Good Hope.
- Citation: 39 Geo. 3. c. 12
- Territorial extent: Great Britain

Dates
- Royal assent: 4 January 1799
- Commencement: 20 November 1798 (Note: Start of session.)
- Repealed: 21 August 1871

Other legislation
- Amends: See § Continued enactments
- Repealed by: Statute Law Revision Act 1871
- Relates to: See Expiring laws continuance acts

Status: Repealed

Text of statute as originally enacted

Text of the Continuance of Laws Act 1799 (39 Geo. 3. c. 12) as in force today (including any amendments) within the United Kingdom, from legislation.gov.uk.

The Continuance of Laws Act 1799 (39 Geo. 3. c. 12) was an act of the Parliament of Great Britain that continued various older acts.

== Background ==
In the United Kingdom, acts of Parliament remain in force until expressly repealed. Many acts of parliament, however, contained time-limited sunset clauses, requiring legislation to revive enactments that had expired or to continue enactments that would otherwise expire.

The Select Committee on Temporary Laws, Expired or Expiring reported on 12 May 1796, which inspected and considered all the temporary laws, observed irregularities in the construction of expiring laws continuance acts, made recommendations and emphasised the importance of the Committee for Expired and Expiring Laws.

== Provisions ==
=== Continued enactments ===
Section 1 of the act continued the Importation Act 1795 (35 Geo. 3. c. 15), the Shipping Act 1795 (35 Geo. 3. c. 80) and the Merchandise in Neutral Ships Act 1796 (36 Geo. 3. c. 76), as continued by the Merchandise in Neutral Ships Act 1796 (37 Geo. 3. c. 12) and the Continuance of Laws (No. 2) Act 1797 (38 Geo. 3. c. 9), until 6 weeks after the start of the next session of parliament.

Section 2 of the act continued the Cape of Good Hope Trade Act 1796 (37 Geo. 3. c. 21) until 6 weeks after the start of the next session of parliament.

== Subsequent developments ==
The whole act was repealed by section 1 of, and the schedule to, the Statute Law Revision Act 1871 (34 & 35 Vict. c. 116), which came into force on 21 August 1871.
