= Continuance of Laws (No. 3) Act 1800 =

Act of the Parliament of Great Britain

- Act of Parliament
- Parliament of Great Britain
- Long title: An Act to revive and continue until the Expiration of six Weeks after the Commencement of the next Session of Parliament, and amend so much of an Act of the last Session of Parliament, as relates to the reducing and better collecting the Duties payable on the Importation of Starch; and to continue for the same Time several Laws relating to the enabling his Majesty to permit Goods to be imported into this Kingdom in Neutral Ships; to the authorizing his Majesty to make Regulations respecting the Trade to the Cape of Good Hope; and to the preventing Offences in obstructing, destroying, or damaging Ships, and in obstructing Seamen and others from pursuing their lawful Occupations.
- Citation: 41 Geo. 3. (G.B.) c. 20
- Territorial extent: Great Britain

Dates
- Royal assent: 31 December 1800
- Commencement: 29 September 1800 (Note: Section 1.)
- Repealed: 21 August 1871
Other legislation
Amends	See § Revived and continued enactments
Amended by	Merchant Shipping Act 1801
Repealed by	Statute Law Revision Act 1871
Relates to	See Expiring laws continuance legislation

Status: Repealed

Text of statute as originally enacted

The Continuance of Laws (No. 3) Act 1800 (41 Geo. 3. (G.B.) c. 20) was an act of the Parliament of Great Britain that revived and continued various older acts.

== Background ==
In the United Kingdom, acts of Parliament remain in force until expressly repealed. Many acts of parliament, however, contained time-limited sunset clauses, requiring legislation to revive enactments that had expired or to continue enactments that would otherwise expire.

== Provisions ==
=== Revived and continued enactments ===
Section 1 of the act revived and continued so much of the Duties on Spirits Act 1799 (39 & 40 Geo. 3. c. 8) "as relates to the reducing and better collecting the Duties payable on the Importation of Starch" from 29 September 1800 until 6 weeks after the start of the next session of parliament.

Section 1 of the act also provided that any foreign starch imported under the authority of the revived act, for which duties had not been actually paid, would be subject to a duty of threepence farthing per pound weight avoirdupois.

== Subsequent developments ==
The whole act was repealed by section 1 of, and the schedule to, the Statute Law Revision Act 1871 (34 & 35 Vict. c. 116), which came into force on 21 August 1871.
