= Continuance of Laws Act 1768 =

Act of the Parliament of Great Britain

- Act of Parliament
- Parliament of Great Britain
- Long title: An Act for further continuing certain Laws, to prohibit for a limited time the Exportation of Corn, Grain, Meal, Malt, Flour, Bread, Biscuit, and Starch; and also the Extraction of Low Wines and Spirits from Wheat and Wheat Flour; for further allowing the Importation of Wheat and Wheat Flour, Barley, Barley Meal, and Pulse, free of Duty, into this Kingdom, from any Part of Europe; and for allowing the Importation of Oats and Oat Meal, Rye and Rye Meal, into this Kingdom, for a limited Time, free of Duty; and also for continuing such other Laws as will expire before the Beginning of the next Session of Parliament.
- Citation: 8 Geo. 3. Sess. 2. c. 1
- Territorial extent: Great Britain

Dates
- Royal assent: 21 May 1768
- Commencement: 10 May 1768 (Note: Start of session.)
- Repealed: 15 July 1867
Other legislation
Amends	See § Continued enactments
Repealed by	Statute Law Revision Act 1867
Relates to	See Expiring laws continuance acts

Status: Repealed

Text of statute as originally enacted

The Continuance of Laws Act 1768 (8 Geo. 3. Sess. 2. c. 1) was an act of the Parliament of Great Britain that continued various older acts.

== Background ==
In the United Kingdom, acts of Parliament remain in force until expressly repealed. Many acts of parliament, however, contained time-limited sunset clauses, requiring legislation to revive enactments that had expired or to continue enactments that would otherwise expire.

== Provisions ==
=== Continued enactments ===
Section 1 of the act continued the Importation and Exportation (No. 6) Act 1766 (7 Geo. 3. c. 3), as continued and amended by the Exportation and Importation Act 1768 (8 Geo. 3. c. 1), together with the amendments in that act, until the 20th day after the start of the next session of parliament.

Section 2 of the act continued the Importation (No. 7) Act 1766 (7 Geo. 3. c. 22) and the Importation (No. 4) Act 1766 (7 Geo. 3. c. 8), as continued by the Exportation and Importation (No. 2) Act 1768 (8 Geo. 3. c. 2), until the 20th day after the start of the next session of parliament.

Section 3 of the act provided that all other acts which had continuance until the end of the present session of parliament would continue until the end of the next session of parliament.

== Subsequent developments ==
The Select Committee on Temporary Laws, Expired or Expiring, appointed in 1796, inspected and considered all temporary laws, observing irregularities in the construction of expiring laws continuance acts, making recommendations and emphasising the importance of the Committee for Expired and Expiring Laws.

The whole act was repealed by section 1 of, and the schedule to, the Statute Law Revision Act 1867 (30 & 31 Vict. c. 59).
