= Continuance of Laws, etc. Act 1791 =

Act of the Parliament of Great Britain

- Act of Parliament
- Parliament of Great Britain
- Long title: An Act to continue several Laws relating to the granting a Bounty on certain Species of British and Irish Linens exported, and taking off the Duties on the Importation of Foreign Raw Linen Yarns made of Flax; to the importing Salt from Europe into the Province of Quebec in America; to the allowing a Bounty on the Exportation of British-made Cordage; to continue and amend several Laws relating to the Encouragement of the Fisheries carried on in the Greenland Seas and Davis's Streights; and to the prohibiting the Exportation of Tools and Utensils made use of in the Iron and Steel Manufactures of this Kingdom; and to prevent the seducing of Artificers and Workmen employed in those Manufactures to go into Parts beyond the Seas; and to make perpetual an Act made in the Fifteenth Year of the Reign of His present Majesty, to permit the free Importation of Raw Goat Skins into this Kingdom.
- Citation: 31 Geo. 3. c. 43
- Territorial extent: Great Britain

Dates
- Royal assent: 6 June 1791
- Commencement: 10 August 1790 (Note: Start of session.)
- Repealed: 6 August 1861

Other legislation
- Amends: See § Revived and continued enactments
- Repealed by: Statute Law Revision Act 1861
- Relates to: See Expiring laws continuance act

Status: Repealed

Text of statute as originally enacted

The Continuance of Laws, etc. Act 1791 (31 Geo. 3. c. 43) was an act of the Parliament of Great Britain that revived, continued and made perpetual various older enactments.

== Background ==
In the United Kingdom, acts of Parliament remain in force until expressly repealed. Many acts of parliament, however, contained time-limited sunset clauses, requiring legislation to revive enactments that had expired or to continue enactments that would otherwise expire.

== Provisions ==
=== Revived and continued enactments ===
Section 1 of the act continued the Exportation Act 1756 (29 Geo. 2. c. 15), as continued by the Exportation (No. 4) Act 1770 (10 Geo. 3. c. 38), the Bounties Act 1779 (19 Geo. 3. c. 27), the Continuance of Laws Act 1787 (27 Geo. 3. c. 36) and the Continuance of Laws (No. 2) Act 1788 (28 Geo. 3. c. 24), from the expiration of the act until the end of the next session of parliament after 24 June 1792.

Section 2 of the act continued the Importation into Quebec Act 1763 (4 Geo. 3. c. 19) (Note: The margin note incorrectly cites this act as "4 Geo. 3. c. 12".), as continued by the Importation into Quebec Act 1766 (6 Geo. 3. c. 42), the Importation and Exportation (No. 6) Act 1772 (13 Geo. 3. c. 69), the Continuance of Laws (No. 2) Act 1780 (20 Geo. 3. c. 19) and the Continuance of Laws Act 1786 (26 Geo. 3. c. 53), from the expiration of the act until the end of the next session of parliament after 24 June 1795.

Section 3 of the act continued the Bounty of Exportation Act 1766 (6 Geo. 3. c. 45), as continued by the Customs (No. 2) Act 1772 (12 Geo. 3. c. 60), the Continuance of Laws, etc. Act 1774 (14 Geo. 3. c. 86) and the Continuance of Laws Act 1776 (17 Geo. 3. c. 44) and revived and continued by the Bounty on Cordage Exported Act 1786 (26 Geo. 3. c. 85), until the end of the next session of parliament after 4 years from the expiration of the act.

Section 4 of the act continued the Fisheries Act 1786 (26 Geo. 3. c. 41) "as relates to the Fisheries carried on in the Greenland Seas and Davis's Straights" until 25 December 1792.

Section 5 of the act provided that harpooners, line-managers, boat-steerers, and other specialists in the Greenland Fishery Trade would be exempt from naval impressment, and seamen employed in the whaling fishery after 1 February each year would not be impressed for a limited time, provided their names were listed in a delivered roll and security given to customs commissioners that they would proceed to Greenland or Davis Strait.

Section 6 of the act continued the Exportation (No. 4) Act 1786 (26 Geo. 3. c. 89), as continued by the Continuance of Laws Act 1787 (27 Geo. 3. c. 36), the Continuance of Laws Act 1788 (28 Geo. 3. c. 23), the Continuance of Laws Act 1789 (29 Geo. 3. c. 55) and the Continuance of Laws Act 1790 (30 Geo. 3. c. 18), until the end of the next session of parliament.

Section 7 of the act made the Customs (No. 2) Act 1775 (15 Geo. 3. c. 35), as continued by the Continuance of Laws (No. 2) Act 1780 (20 Geo. 3. c. 19) and the Continuance of Laws Act 1786 (26 Geo. 3. c. 53), perpetual.

== Subsequent developments ==
The Select Committee on Temporary Laws, Expired or Expiring, appointed in 1796, inspected and considered all temporary laws, observing irregularities in the construction of expiring laws continuance acts, making recommendations and emphasising the importance of the Committee for Expired and Expiring Laws.

The whole act was repealed by section 1 of, and the schedule to, the Statute Law Revision Act 1861 (24 & 25 Vict. c. 101), which came into force on 6 August 1861.
