= Continuance of Laws, etc. Act 1723 =

Act of the Parliament of Great Britain

- Act of Parliament
- Parliament of Great Britain
- Long title: An Act for continuing Acts for preventing Theft and Rapine upon the Northern Borders of England; and for better regulating of Pilots, and for regulating the Price and Assize of Bread; and for better Encouragement of the making of Sail Cloth in Great Britain.
- Citation: 10 Geo. 1. c. 17
- Territorial extent: Great Britain

Dates
- Royal assent: 24 April 1724
- Commencement: 9 January 1724 (Note: Start of session.)
- Repealed: 15 July 1867
Other legislation
Amends	See § Continued enactments
Repealed by	Statute Law Revision Act 1867
Relates to	See Expiring laws continuance acts

Status: Repealed

Text of statute as originally enacted

The Continuance of Laws, etc. Act 1723 (10 Geo. 1. c. 17) was an act of the Parliament of Great Britain that continued various older acts.

== Background ==
In the United Kingdom, acts of Parliament remain in force until expressly repealed. Many acts of parliament, however, contained time-limited sunset clauses, requiring legislation to revive enactments that had expired or to continue enactments that would otherwise expire.

== Provisions ==
=== Continued enactments ===
Section 1 of the act continued the Moss Troopers Act 1662 (14 Cha. 2. c. 2), as continued by the Moss Troopers Act 1712 (12 Ann. c. 10) for 11 years from the expiration of the act.

Section 2 of the act continued the Pilotage Act 1716 (3 Geo. 1. c. 23), as continued by the Trade to East Indies, etc. Act 1720 (7 Geo. 1. St. 1. c. 21), until the end of the next session of parliament after 11 years from the expiration of the act.

Section 3 of the act continued the Price and Assise of Bread Act 1709 (8 Ann. c. 18) (Note: This is the chapter in The Statutes at Large.), as continued by the Continuance of Laws, etc. Act 1714 (1 Geo. 1. St. 2. c. 26) and the Continuance of Laws Act 1718 (5 Geo. 1. c. 25), until the end of the next session of parliament after 7 years from the expiration of the act.

Section 4 of the act continued the Sail Cloth Manufacture Act 1712 (12 Ann. St. 1. c. 16) (Note: This is the chapter in The Statutes at Large.), as continued by the Continuance of Laws Act 1718 (5 Geo. 1. c. 25), until the end of the next session of parliament after 7 years from the expiration of the act.

== Legacy ==
The Select Committee on Temporary Laws, Expired or Expiring, appointed in 1796, inspected and considered all temporary laws, observing irregularities in the construction of expiring laws continuance acts, making recommendations and emphasising the importance of the Committee for Expired and Expiring Laws.

The whole act was repealed by section 1 of, and the schedule to, the Statute Law Revision Act 1867 (30 & 31 Vict. c. 59).
