= Perpetuation and Amendment of Laws Act 1704 =

Act of the Parliament of England

- Act of Parliament
- Parliament of England
- Long title: An Act for making perpetual an Act, for the more easy Recovery of small Tithes; and also an Act for the more easy obtaining Partition of Lands in Coparcenary, Joint Tenancy, and Tenancy in Common; and also for making more effectual and amending several Acts, relating to the Return of Jurors.
- Citation: 3 & 4 Ann. c. 16 (Note: This is the citation in The Statutes of the Realm.); 3 & 4 Ann. c. 18 (Note: This is the citation in The Statutes at Large.)
- Territorial extent: England and Wales

Dates
- Royal assent: 14 March 1705
- Commencement: 24 October 1704 (Note: Start of session.)
- Repealed: 15 July 1867

Other legislation
- Amends: Recovery of Small Tithes Act 1695; Partition Act 1696
- Amended by: Continuance of Laws Act 1722
- Repealed by: Statute Law Revision Act 1867
- Relates to: Juries Act 1695; See Expiring laws continuance act

Status: Repealed

Text of statute as originally enacted

The Perpetuation and Amendment of Laws Act 1704 (3 & 4 Ann. c. 16) was an act of the Parliament of England that made perpetual and amended several older acts.

== Background ==
In the United Kingdom, acts of Parliament remain in force until expressly repealed. Many acts of parliament, however, contained time-limited sunset clauses, requiring legislation to revive enactments that had expired or to continue enactments that would otherwise expire.

== Provisions ==
Section 1 of the act made the Recovery of Small Tithes Act 1695 (7 & 8 Will. 3. c. 6), as continued by the Recovery of Tithes Act 1698 (10 Will. 3. c. 21), perpetual.

Section 2 of the act made the Partition Act 1696 (8 & 9 Will. 3. c. 31) perpetual.

Section 3 of the act amended sections 16 to 23 of the Estreats (Personal Representatives) Act 1692 (4 Will. & Mar. c. 24), as continued by section 10 of the Juries Act 1695 (7 & 8 Will. 3. c. 32) and by section 2 of the Continuance of Laws Act 1702 (1 Ann. St. 2. c. 13), providing that any Sheriff of the County of York who refuses or neglects to keep proper juror registers, enter names of persons who served as jurors, deliver such registers to succeeding Sheriffs, or provide required certificates shall forfeit the sum of £100 for each offence.

Section 4 of the act provided that if any Sheriff, Undersheriff, Deputy or Bailiff knowingly summons or returns any person to serve on a jury who has served within the previous four years, and does not discharge such summons upon production of proper certificates, they shall forfeit £20, recoverable together with full costs of suit.

Section 5 of the act amended the provisions in the Estreats (Personal Representatives) Act 1692 (4 & 5 Will. & Mar. c. 24) and section 4 of the Juries Act 1695 (7 & 8 Will. 3. c. 32), providing that Justices of Peace shall yearly issue warrants to Head Constables requiring them to direct local Constables, Tythingmen, and Headboroughs to meet and prepare true lists of persons qualified to serve on juries, with penalties of £10 for Head Constables and £5 for Constables who fail to comply with these duties.

Section 6 of the act provided that Justices of the Peace must publicly read the Estreats (Personal Representatives) Act 1692 (4 & 5 Will. & Mar. c. 24) and Juries Act 1695 (7 & 8 Will. 3. c. 32) annually at Quarterly Sessions held after 24 June 1705.

== Subsequent developments ==
So much of the act as relates to jurors, and to the returns and service of jurors was continued until the end of the next session of parliament after 3 years from the expiration of those enactments by the Continuance of Laws Act 1722 (9 Geo. 1. c. 8).

The Select Committee on Temporary Laws, Expired or Expiring, appointed in 1796, inspected and considered all temporary laws, observing irregularities in the construction of expiring laws continuance acts, making recommendations and emphasising the importance of the Committee for Expired and Expiring Laws.

The whole act was repealed by section 1 of, and the schedule to, the Statute Law Revision Act 1867 (30 & 31 Vict. c. 59), which came into force on 15 July 1867.
