= Naval and Victualling Stores Act 1862 =

Act of the Parliament of the United Kingdom

Naval and Victualling Stores Act 1862 (Note: Section 1.)
- Act of Parliament
- Parliament of the United Kingdom
- Long title: An Act for the better Protection of Her Majesty's Naval and Victualling Stores.
- Citation: 25 & 26 Vict. c. 64
- Territorial extent: England and Wales (Note: Section 2.)

Dates
- Royal assent: 29 July 1862
- Commencement: 29 July 1862 (Note: The Acts of Parliament (Commencement) Act 1793.)
- Repealed: 29 July 1864
Other legislation
Amends	Criminal Justice Act 1855; Larceny Act 1861; See § Repealed enactments
Repeals/revokes	See § Repealed enactments
Repealed by	Naval and Victualling Stores Act 1864

Status: Repealed

Text of statute as originally enacted

The Naval and Victualling Stores Act 1862 (25 & 26 Vict. c. 64) was an act of the Parliament of the United Kingdom that consolidated enactments related to the protection of the Royal Navy's naval and victualling stores from theft and embezzlement in England and Wales.

== Provisions ==
=== Repealed enactments ===
Section 4 of the act repealed 10 enactments, listed in schedule A to the act, as to Her Majesty's naval and victualling stores, but not as to Scotland or Ireland; the repeal did not affect the past operation of those enactments, any act done or right or liability already accrued under them, any penalty or punishment already incurred, or the institution of proceedings in respect of any such liability, penalty or punishment.

Citation	Short title	Description	Extent of repeal
9 & 10 Will. 3. c. 41	Embezzlement of Public Stores Act 1697	An Act for the better preventing the Imbezlement of His Majesty's Stores of War, and preventing Cheats, Frauds, and Abuses, in paying Seamen's Wages.	Sections one, two, four, five, and eight.
9 Geo. 1. c. 8	Continuance of Laws Act 1722	An Act for continuing some Laws, and reviving others therein mentioned, for exempting Apothecaries from serving Parish and Ward Offices, and upon Juries; and relating to Jurors; and to the Payment of Seamen's Wages, and the Preservation of Naval Stores, and Stores of War; and concerning the Militia and Trophy-Money; and against clandestine running of uncustomed Goods, and for more effectual preventing Frauds relating to the Customs, and Frauds in mixing Silk with Stuffs to be exported.	Sections three, four, and five.
17 Geo. 2. c. 40	Universities (Wine Licences) Act 1743	An Act to continue the several Laws therein mentioned for preventing Theft and Rapine on the Northern Borders of England; for the more effectual punishing wicked and evil-disposed Persons going armed in Disguise, and doing Injuries and Violences to the Persons and Properties of His Majesty's Subjects, and for the more speedy bringing the Offenders to Justice; for continuing Two Clauses to prevent the cutting or breaking down the Bank of any River, or Sea Bank, and to prevent the malicious cutting of Hopbinds; and for the more effectual Punishment of Persons maliciously setting on fire any Mine, Pit, or Delph of Coal, or Cannel Coal; and of Persons unlawfully hunting or taking any Red or Fallow Deer in Forests or Chaces, or beating or wounding the Keepers or other Officers in Forests, Chaces, or Parks; and for granting a Liberty to carry Sugars of the Growth, Produce, or Manufacture of any of His Majesty's Sugar Colonies in America, from the said Colonies directly to Foreign Parts in Ships built in Great Britain, and navigated according to Law; and to explain Two Acts relating to the Prosecution of Offenders for embezzling Naval Stores, or Stores of War; and to prevent the retailing of Wine within either of the Universities in that Part of Great Britain called England without Licence.	Section ten.
39 & 40 Geo. 3. c. 89	Embezzlement of Public Stores Act 1800	An Act for the better preventing the Embezzlement of His Majesty's Naval, Ordnance, and Victualling Stores.	The whole act.
54 Geo. 3. c. 60	Embezzlement of Cordage Act 1814	An Act for the better preventing the Embezzlement of His Majesty's Cordage.	The whole act.
54 Geo. 3. c. 159	Harbours Act 1814	An Act for the better Regulation of the several Ports, Harbours, Roadsteads, Sounds, Channels, Bays, and navigable Rivers, in the United Kingdom; and of His Majesty's Docks, Dock Yards, Arsenals, Wharfs, Moorings, and Stores therein; and for repealing several Acts passed for that Purpose.	Section ten.
55 Geo. 3. c. 127	Embezzlement of Public Stores Act 1815	An Act to repeal an Act of the Fifty-third Year of His present Majesty, for preventing the Embezzlement of Stores; and to extend the Provisions of the several Acts relating to His Majesty's Naval, Ordnance, and Victualling Stores to all other public Stores.	The whole act.
56 Geo. 3. c. 80	Naval Stores Act 1816	An Act to enable the principal Officers and Commissioners of His Majesty's Navy resident on Foreign Stations to grant Certificates of Stores or Goods which may be sold by such Officers or Commissioners at such Foreign Stations.	The whole act.
4 Geo. 4. c. 53	Benefit of Clergy, etc. Act 1823	An Act for extending the Benefit of Clergy to several Larcenies therein mentioned.	The whole act.
2 & 3 Will. 4. c. 40	Admiralty Act 1832	An Act to amend the Laws relating to the Business of the Civil Departments of the Navy, and to make other Regulations for more effectually carrying on the Duties of the said Departments.	Section thirty-four.

== Subsequent developments ==
The whole act was repealed by section 4 of the Naval and Victualling Stores Act 1864 (27 & 28 Vict. c. 91), which came into force on 29 July 1864. The 1864 act re-enacted the 1862 act's provisions in a similar form.
