= Special jury =

A special jury, which is a jury selected from a special roll of persons with a restrictive qualification, could be used for civil or criminal cases, although in criminal cases only for misdemeanours such as seditious libel. The party opting for a special jury was charged a fee, which was 12 guineas just prior to abolition in England.

The qualifications to be a special juror in England were governed by the Juries Act 1870, and the main difference between the special jury and a common jury under that Act was merely a matter of wealth; indeed, it was little more than a question of whether a person lived in a larger house, because it was mainly a question of the rateable value of the house. A householder rated at £100 in a large town, or £50 in a small town, was qualified to be a special juror, while a householder rated at £30 in London and Middlesex, and £20 elsewhere, was qualified to be a common juror. There were various other qualifications for a special juror, such as if a man was entitled to be called "Esquire," or if he was a merchant or a banker, but in practice the special jury list was largely made up on the basis of rateable qualification (i.e. liability for local property tax in England).

== History ==
Juries Act 1729
- Act of Parliament
- Parliament of Great Britain
- Long title: An Act for the better Regulation of Juries.
- Citation: 3 Geo. 2. c. 25
- Territorial extent: Great Britain

Dates
- Royal assent: 15 May 1730
- Commencement: 1 September 1730 (Note: Section 1.)
- Repealed: 1 January 1826
Other legislation
Amended by	Juries Act 1730; Perpetuation of Various Laws Act 1732; Juries Act 1825
Repealed by	Juries Act 1825

Status: Repealed

Text of statute as originally enacted

It has been said by authority that it cannot be ascertained at what time the practice of appointing special jurors for trials at nisi prius first began, but that it probably arose out of the custom of appointing jurors for trials at the bar of the courts at Westminster, and was introduced for the better administration of justice, and for securing the nomination of jurors duly qualified in all respects for their important office. The first statutory recognition of their existence occurs so late as in the Juries Act 1729 (3 Geo. 2. c. 25), but the principle seems to have been admitted in early times. We find in the year 1450 (29 Hen. 6) a petition for a special jury, that is jurors 'who dwell within the shire, and have lands and tenements to the yearly value of £20 to try a plea which it was supposed might be pleaded in abatement on a bill of appeal of murder. The Juries Act 1729 speaks of special juries as already well known, and it declares and enacts that the courts at Westminster shall, upon motion made by any plaintiff prosecutor, or defendant, order and appoint a jury to be struck before the proper officer of the court where the cause is depending 'in such manner as special juries have been and are usually struck in such courts respectively upon trials at bar had in the said courts.' And although Section 17 provides for the return of properly qualified jurors, and the attendance of the sheriff in any cause arising in any city or county of a city or town, it says nothing as to the qualification of the jurors or the attendance of the sheriff in causes arising in a county at large leaving that to be enforced according to antecedent practice, which may well be supposed to have been more perfectly established in the cases of ordinary counties rather than in smaller districts (counties of a town, etc.), by reason of its more frequent occurrence.

The special jury was used most extensively from 1770 to 1790, roughly during Lord Mansfield's tenure as Lord Chief Justice of the Court of King's Bench, and declined thereafter. The first statutory requirements for special jurors were introduced in the Juries Act 1825 (6 Geo. 4. c. 50), which required such jurors to be merchants, bankers, esquires, or persons of higher degree.

In the 18th century State Trials, the Crown was often able to secure guilty verdicts in the case of misdemeanours such as seditious libel, by the use of special juries, because of the narrow section of the population from which they were drawn.

=== United States ===
In the history of the United States Supreme Court, the court has only presided over one jury trial. In the 1794 case of Georgia v. Brailsford, the court empaneled a special jury.

== Practice ==
The practice with respect to forming or striking, as it is technically called, a special jury in the 19th century was as follows. Each party is entitled to have the cause tried by such a jury, and the attorneys on both sides, and the under-sheriff or his agent, attend before the proper officer of the court with the special jurors' list, which, under the provisions of the Juries Act 1825 (6 Geo. 4. c. 50), the sheriff is directed annually to make out from the jurors' books; and from among those described in that book as esquires, or as persons of higher degree, or as bankers or merchants; and tickets corresponding with the names of the jurors on the list being put into a box and shaken, the officer takes out forty-eight, to any of which names either party may object for incapacity; and supposing the objection to be established, another name is substituted. The list of forty-eight is next, and at a subsequent period, reduced by striking off, before the same officer, the names of such twelve jurors as either party shall in a turn wish to have removed; and the names of the remaining twenty-four are then inserted in the writ of distringas as the jurors to be summoned for the cause, which persons are then summoned by the sheriff to attend the trial.

== Abolition ==
Special juries were abolished in England in 1949, except for the City of London special jury, which remained available until 1971 for commercial trials in the Queen's Bench Division of the High Court of Justice.
