= Continuance of Laws Act 1797 =

Act of the Parliament of Great Britain

- Act of Parliament
- Parliament of Great Britain
- Long title: An Act to revive and continue the Bounties granted by an Act made in the twenty-sixth Year of the Reign of His present Majesty, for encouraging the Fisheries carried on at Newfoundland and Parts adjacent, from Great Britain, Ireland and the British Dominions in Europe; to continue so much of an Act made in the thirty third Year of the Reign of His present Majesty, as permits the Importation and Exportation of certain Goods, Wares and Merchandizes, in foreign Ships, into and from the Port of Saint John's in the Island of Antigua; and so much of an Act made in the thirty-third Year of the Reign of His present Majesty, as permits Sir William Bishop, George Bishop and Argles Bishop, to carry on the Manufacture of Maidstone Geneva; and also so much of an Act made in the thirty-fifth Year of the Reign of His present Majesty, for better securing the Duties on Glass, as was to continue for a limited time.
- Citation: 37 Geo. 3. c. 99
- Territorial extent: Great Britain

Dates
- Royal assent: 4 July 1797
- Commencement: 4 July 1797 (Note: The Acts of Parliament (Commencement) Act 1793.)
- Repealed: 21 August 1871
Other legislation
Amends	See § Revived and continued enactments
Repealed by	Statute Law Revision Act 1871
Relates to	See Expiring laws continuance acts

Status: Repealed

Text of statute as originally enacted

The Continuance of Laws Act 1797 (37 Geo. 3. c. 99) was an act of the Parliament of Great Britain that revived and continued various older acts.

== Background ==
In the United Kingdom, acts of Parliament remain in force until expressly repealed. Many acts of parliament, however, contained time-limited sunset clauses, requiring legislation to revive enactments that had expired or to continue enactments that would otherwise expire.

The Select Committee on Temporary Laws, Expired or Expiring reported on 12 May 1796, which inspected and considered all the temporary laws, observed irregularities in the construction of expiring laws continuance acts, made recommendations and emphasised the importance of the Committee for Expired and Expiring Laws.

== Provisions ==
=== Revived and continued enactments ===
Section 1 of the act revived and continued the Newfoundland Fisheries Act 1786 (26 Geo. 3. c. 26) from 1 January 1797 for 2 years.

Section 2 of the act continued the Importation and Exportation Act 1793 (33 Geo. 3. c. 59) "as respects the Port of St John's in the Island of Antigua" until 10 July 1801.

Section 3 of the act providing that Sir William Bishop, George Bishop, Argles Bishop and their successors, could make the gin Maidstone Geneva from 5 July 1797 until 5 July 1799, subject to the duties of the Excise Act 1793 (33 Geo. 3. c. 59), as continued by the Duties on Spirits Act 1795 (35 Geo. 3. c. 89).

Section 3 of the act continued the Duties on Glass Act 1795 (35 Geo. 3. c. 114) "as was to have Continuance until the fifth day of July one thousand seven hundred and ninety-seven" until 5 July 1798.

== Subsequent developments ==
The whole act was repealed by section 1 of, and the schedule to, the Statute Law Revision Act 1871 (34 & 35 Vict. c. 116), which came into force on 21 August 1871.
