= Continuance of Laws Act 1799 (39 & 40 Geo. 3. c. 9) =

Act of the Parliament of Great Britain

- Act of Parliament
- Parliament of Great Britain
- Long title: An Act to continue, until the twentieth Day of February one thousand eight hundred, several Laws relating to the Prevention and Punishment of Attempts to seduce Persons serving in his Majesty's Forces; to the empowering his Majesty to accept the Services of such Parts of the Militia of this Kingdom as may offer to serve in Ireland; to the Admission of certain Articles of Merchandize in neutral Ships, and the issuing of Orders in Council for that Purpose; to the authorizing his Majesty to make Regulations respecting the Trade to the Cape of Good Hope; to the establishing Courts of Judicature in the Island of Newfoundland; to the enabling his Majesty to permit Goods to be imported into this Kingdom in neutral Ships; and to continue, until the thirtieth Day of September one thousand eight hundred, an Act of the last Session of Parliament, for enabling his Majesty to prohibit the Exportation, and permit the Importation of Corn, and for allowing the Importation of other Articles of Provision, without Payment of Duty.
- Citation: 39 & 40 Geo. 3. c. 9
- Territorial extent: Great Britain

Dates
- Royal assent: 12 October 1799
- Commencement: 12 October 1799 (Note: The Acts of Parliament (Commencement) Act 1793.)
- Repealed: 21 August 1871

Other legislation
- Amends: See § Continued enactments
- Repealed by: Statute Law Revision Act 1871
- Relates to: See Expiring laws continuance acts

Status: Repealed

Text of statute as originally enacted

The Continuance of Laws Act 1799 (39 & 40 Geo. 3. c. 9) was an act of the Parliament of Great Britain that continued various older acts.

== Background ==
In the United Kingdom, acts of Parliament remain in force until expressly repealed. Many acts of parliament, however, contained time-limited sunset clauses, requiring legislation to revive enactments that had expired or to continue enactments that would otherwise expire.

The Select Committee on Temporary Laws, Expired or Expiring reported on 12 May 1796, which inspected and considered all the temporary laws, observed irregularities in the construction of expiring laws continuance acts, made recommendations and emphasised the importance of the Committee for Expired and Expiring Laws.

== Provisions ==
=== Continued enactments ===
Section 1 of the act continued the Incitement to Mutiny Act 1797 (37 Geo. 3. c. 70), the Militia (No. 4) Act 1798 (38 Geo. 3. c. 66) as amended and continued by the Militia (No. 5) Act 1798 (39 Geo. 3. c. 5), the Importation Act 1795 (35 Geo. 3. c. 15), the Shipping Act 1795 (35 Geo. 3. c. 80) and the Merchandise in Neutral Ships Act 1796 (36 Geo. 3. c. 76) as continued by several previous acts, the Cape of Good Hope Trade Act 1796 (37 Geo. 3. c. 21) as continued by several previous acts, the Courts (Newfoundland) Act 1793 (33 Geo. 3. c. 76) as continued by several previous acts, and the Importation (No. 7) Act 1799 (39 Geo. 3. c. 112), until 20 February 1800.

Section 2 of the act continued the Importation (No. 3) Act 1799 (39 Geo. 3. c. 87) until 20 September 1800.

== Subsequent developments ==
The whole act was repealed by section 1 of, and the schedule to, the Statute Law Revision Act 1871 (34 & 35 Vict. c. 116), which came into force on 21 August 1871.
