= Continuance of Laws (No. 2) Act 1797 =

Act of the Parliament of Great Britain

- Act of Parliament
- Parliament of Great Britain
- Long title: An Act to continue until the Expiration of Six Weeks after the Commencement of the next Session of Parliament, an Act passed in the Thirty-fifth Year of His present Majesty, Chapter Fifteen, videlicet, on the Sixteenth Day of March One thousand seven hundred and ninety five; and also an Act passed in the same Year, Chapter Eighty, videlicet, on the Twenty-second Day of May One thousand seven hundred and ninety five; and also another Act passed in the Thirty-sixth Year of His present Majesty, Chapter Seventy six, videlicet, on the fourteenth Day of May One thousand seven hundred and ninety-six, relating to the Admission of certain Articles of Merchandize in Neutral Ships, and the issuing of Orders in Council for that Purpose; and to continue for the same Period, an Act passed in the Session of Parliament holden in the thirty sixth and thirty seventh Years of His present Majesty, Chapter Twenty-one, videlicet, on the Twenty-eighth Day of December One thousand seven hundred and ninety six, authorizing His Majesty to make Regulations respecting the Trade and Commerce to and from the Cape of Good Hope.
- Citation: 38 Geo. 3. c. 9
- Territorial extent: Great Britain

Dates
- Royal assent: 30 December 1797
- Commencement: 30 December 1797 (Note: The Acts of Parliament (Commencement) Act 1793.)
- Repealed: 21 August 1871
Other legislation
Amends	See § Continued enactments
Repealed by	Statute Law Revision Act 1871
Relates to	See Expiring laws continuance acts

Status: Repealed

Text of statute as originally enacted

The Continuance of Laws (No. 2) Act 1797 (38 Geo. 3. c. 9) was an act of the Parliament of Great Britain that continued various older acts.

== Background ==
In the United Kingdom, acts of Parliament remain in force until expressly repealed. Many acts of parliament, however, contained time-limited sunset clauses, requiring legislation to revive enactments that had expired or to continue enactments that would otherwise expire.

The Select Committee on Temporary Laws, Expired or Expiring reported on 12 May 1796, which inspected and considered all the temporary laws, observed irregularities in the construction of expiring laws continuance acts, made recommendations and emphasised the importance of the Committee for Expired and Expiring Laws.

== Provisions ==
=== Continued enactments ===
The act continued the Courts (Newfoundland) Act 1795 (35 Geo. 3. c. 25), the Shipping Act 1795 (c. 80), Merchandise in Neutral Ships Act 1796 (36 Geo. 3. c. 76) "relating to the Admission of certain Articles of Merchandize in Neutral Ships, and the issuing of Orders in Council for that Purpose" and the 1796 act "authorizing His Majesty to make Regulations respecting the Trade and Commerce to and from the Cape of Good Hope" until 6 weeks after the start of the next session of parliament.

== Subsequent developments ==
The whole act was repealed by section 1 of, and the schedule to, the Statute Law Revision Act 1871 (34 & 35 Vict. c. 116), which came into force on 21 August 1871.
