= Laws Continuance, etc. Act 1739 =

Act of the Parliament of Great Britain

- Act of Parliament
- Parliament of Great Britain
- Long title: An Act to continue several Laws therein mentioned, for punishing such Persons as shall wilfully and maliciously pull down or destroy Turnpikes for repairing Highways, or Locks or other Works erected by Authority of Parliament for making Rivers navigable; for preventing Exactions of the Occupiers of Locks and Wears upon the River of Thames Westward, and for ascertaining the Rates of Water-carriage upon the said River; for preventing frivolous and vexatious Arrests; and for better securing the lawful Trade of His Majesty's Subjects to and from The East Indies, and for the more effectual preventing all His Majesty's Subjects trading thither under Foreign Commissions; and for limiting the Time for suing forth Writs of Certiorari upon Proceedings before Justices of the Peace, and for regulating the Time and Manner of applying for the same; for the better and more speedy Execution of Process within particular Franchises or Liberties; and for extending the Powers and Authorities of Justices of the Peace of Counties, touching County Rates, to the Justices of the Peace of such Liberties and Franchises as have Commissions of the Peace within themselves.
- Citation: 13 Geo. 2. c. 18
- Territorial extent: Great Britain

Dates
- Royal assent: 29 April 1740
- Commencement: 15 November 1739 (Note: Start of session.)
- Repealed: 27 March 1888
Other legislation
Amends	See § Continued enactments
Amended by	County Rates 1852
Repealed by	Statute Law Revision Act 1888
Relates to	See Expiring laws continuance acts

Status: Repealed

Text of statute as originally enacted

The Laws Continuance, etc. Act 1739 (13 Geo. 2. c. 18) was an act of the Parliament of Great Britain that continued various older enactments.

== Background ==
In the United Kingdom, acts of Parliament remain in force until expressly repealed. Many acts of parliament, however, contained time-limited sunset clauses, requiring legislation to revive enactments that had expired or to continue enactments that would otherwise expire.

== Provisions ==
=== Continued enactments ===
Section 1 of the act continued the Destruction of Turnpikes, etc. Act 1727 (1 Geo. 2. St. 2. c. 19), as continued by the Destruction of Turnpikes, etc. Act 1731 (5 Geo. 2. c. 33) and the Continuance of Laws Act 1734 (8 Geo. 2. c. 18), from the expiration of the act until 1 June 1747.

Section 2 of the act continued the Thames Navigation Act 1729 (3 Geo. 2. c. 11) from the expiration of the act until 1 June 1747.

Section 3 of the act. continued the Frivolous Arrests Act 1725 (12 Geo. 1. c. 29) from the expiration of the act until 1 June 1747.

Section 4 of the act continued the Trade to East Indies Act 1731 (5 Geo. 2. c. 29) from the expiration of the act until 1 June 1747.

Section 5 of the act provided that after 24 June 1740, no writ of certiorari to remove judgments from justices of the peace would be granted unless applied for within six calendar months of the original proceedings and with six days' written notice to the justices involved, allowing them opportunity to show cause against issuing the writ.

Section 6 of the act provided that after 3 November 1740, county sheriffs must appoint deputies in franchises or liberties at the request and expense of the lords or proprietors entitled to return writs, with these deputies residing in convenient towns appointed by the Lord Chancellor or Chief Justices to receive and execute writs under the sheriff's name.

Section 7 of the act provided that justices of the peace in liberties and franchises with their own commissions could exercise the same powers to assess and collect county rates within their jurisdictions as county justices, resolving doubts about whether such separate jurisdictions were covered by the county rate legislation.

== Subsequent developments ==
So much of the act "as extended the Powers of Justices of the Peace of Counties touching County Rates to the Justices of the Peace of such Liberties and Franchises as have Commissions of the Peace within themselves." was repealed by section 1 of the County Rates 1852 (15 & 16 Vict. c. 81).

The whole act was repealed by section 1 of, and part II of the schedule to, the Statute Law Revision Act 1888 (51 & 52 Vict. c. 3).
