= Continuance of Laws (No. 2) Act 1780 =

Act of the Parliament of Great Britain

- Act of Parliament
- Parliament of Great Britain
- Long title: An Act to continue several Laws relating to the better securing the lawful Trade of His Majesty's Subjects to and from the East Indies, and for the more effectual preventing all His Majesty's Subjects trading thither under Foreign Commissions; to the importing Salt from Europe into the Province of Quebec in America; to the permitting the free Importation of Raw Goat Skins into this Kingdom; to the allowing the Exportation of certain Quantities of Wheat and other Articles, to His Majesty's Sugar Colonies in America; and to the permitting the Exportation of Tobacco Pipe Clay from this Kingdom to the British Sugar Colonies or Plantations in the West Indies.
- Citation: 20 Geo. 3. c. 19
- Territorial extent: Great Britain

Dates
- Royal assent: 21 March 1780
- Commencement: 25 November 1779 (Note: Start of session.)
- Repealed: 21 August 1871

Other legislation
- Amends: See § Continued enactments
- Repealed by: Statute Law Revision Act 1871
- Relates to: See Expiring laws continuance acts

Status: Repealed

Text of statute as originally enacted

The Continuance of Laws (No. 2) Act 1780 (20 Geo. 3. c. 19) was an act of the Parliament of Great Britain that continued various older acts.

== Background ==
In the United Kingdom, acts of Parliament remain in force until expressly repealed. Many acts of parliament, however, contained time-limited sunset clauses, requiring legislation to revive enactments that had expired or to continue enactments that would otherwise expire.

== Provisions ==
=== Continued enactments ===
Section 1 of the act continued the Trade to East Indies Act 1731 (5 Geo. 2. c. 29), as continued by the Laws Continuance, etc. Act 1739 (13 Geo. 2. c. 18) and the Continuance of Laws Act 1746 (20 Geo. 2. c. 47), from the expiration of the act until the end of the next session of parliament after 25 March 1800.

Section 2 of the act continued the Importation into Quebec Act 1763 (4 Geo. 3. c. 19), as continued by the Importation into Quebec Act 1766 (6 Geo. 3. c. 42) and the Importation and Exportation (No. 6) Act 1772 (13 Geo. 3. c. 69), from the expiration of the act until the end of the next session of parliament after 24 June 1785.

Section 3 of the act continued the Customs (No. 2) Act 1775 (15 Geo. 3. c. 35) from the expiration of the act until the end of the next session of parliament after 20 June 1785.

Section 4 of the act continued the Exportation Act 1776 (16 Geo. 3. c. 37) "as relates to allowing the exportation of certain quantities of wheat, and other articles to his Majesty's sugar colonies in America", as continued by the Exportation (No. 2) Act 1776 (17 Geo. 3. c. 28), the Exportation Act 1778 (18 Geo. 3. c. 16) and the Continuance of Laws Act 1779 (19 Geo. 3. c. 22), from the expiration of the act until 1 May 1781.

Section 5 of the act continued the Customs (No. 6) Act 1776 (17 Geo. 3. c. 43) "as permits the exportation of tobacco-pipe clay from this kingdom to the British sugar colonies or plantations in the West Indies" from the expiration of those enactments until the next session of parliament after 24 June 1783.

== Subsequent developments ==
The Select Committee on Temporary Laws, Expired or Expiring, appointed in 1796, inspected and considered all temporary laws, observing irregularities in the construction of expiring laws continuance acts, making recommendations and emphasising the importance of the Committee for Expired and Expiring Laws.

The whole act was repealed by section 1 of, and the schedule to, the Statute Law Revision Act 1871 (34 & 35 Vict. c. 116), which came into force on 21 August 1871.
