= Continuance of Laws Act 1790 =

Act of the Parliament of Great Britain

- Act of Parliament
- Parliament of Great Britain
- Long title: An Act to continue the several Laws therein mentioned, relating to encouraging the Manufacture of Leather by lowering the Duty payable upon the Importation of Oak Bark, when the Price of such Bark shall exceed a certain Rate; to the prohibiting the Exportation of Tools and Utensils made use of in the Iron and Steel Manufactures of this Kingdom; and to prevent the seducing of Artificers and Workmen employed in those Manufactures to go into Parts beyond the Seas; and to the ascertaining the Strength of Spirits by Clarke's Hydrometer.
- Citation: 30 Geo. 3. c. 18
- Territorial extent: Great Britain

Dates
- Royal assent: 28 April 1790
- Commencement: 21 January 1790 (Note: Start of session.)
- Repealed: 21 August 1871

Other legislation
- Amends: See § Continued enactments
- Repealed by: Statute Law Revision Act 1871
- Relates to: See Expiring laws continuance acts

Status: Repealed

Text of statute as originally enacted

The Continuance of Laws Act 1790 (30 Geo. 3. c. 18) was an act of the Parliament of Great Britain that continued various older acts.

== Background ==
In the United Kingdom, acts of Parliament remain in force until expressly repealed. Many acts of parliament, however, contained time-limited sunset clauses, requiring legislation to revive enactments that had expired or to continue enactments that would otherwise expire.

== Provisions ==
=== Continued enactments ===
Section 1 of the act continued the Customs (No. 1) Act 1772 (12 Geo. 3. c. 50), as continued by the Continuance of Laws Act 1776 (17 Geo. 3. c. 44) and the Manufacture of Leather Act 1784 (24 Geo. 3. Sess. 2. c. 19), until the end of the next session of parliament after 5 years.

Section 2 of the act continued the Exportation (No. 4) Act 1786 (26 Geo. 3. c. 89), as continued by the Continuance of Laws Act 1787 (27 Geo. 3. c. 36), the Continuance of Laws Act 1788 (28 Geo. 3. c. 23) and Continuance of Laws Act 1789 (29 Geo. 3. c. 55), until the end of the next session of parliament.

Section 3 of the act continued the Exports Act 1787 (27 Geo. 3. c. 31) "as directs that all Spirits shall be deemed and taken to be of the Degree of Strength as Which the Hydrometer, commonly called Clarke's Hydrometer, shall, upon Trial of any Officer or Officers of Excise, denote any such Spirits to be", as continued by the Continuance of Laws Act 1788 (28 Geo. 3. c. 23) and the Continuance of Laws Act 1789 (29 Geo. 3. c. 55), until the end of the next session of parliament.

== Subsequent developments ==
The Select Committee on Temporary Laws, Expired or Expiring, appointed in 1796, inspected and considered all temporary laws, observing irregularities in the construction of expiring laws continuance acts, making recommendations and emphasising the importance of the Committee for Expired and Expiring Laws.

The whole act was repealed by section 1 of, and the schedule to, the Statute Law Revision Act 1871 (34 & 35 Vict. c. 116), which came into force on 21 August 1871.
