= Continuance of Laws Act 1737 =

Act of the Parliament of Great Britain

- Act of Parliament
- Parliament of Great Britain
- Long title: An Act to continue Two several Acts therein mentioned; one, for encouraging the Growth of Coffee in His Majesty's Plantations in America; and the other, for the better securing and encouraging the Trade of His Majesty's Sugar Colonies in America.
- Citation: 11 Geo. 2. c. 18
- Territorial extent: Great Britain

Dates
- Royal assent: 20 May 1738
- Commencement: 24 January 1738 (Note: Start of session.)
- Repealed: 15 July 1867
Other legislation
| Amends | Further information: § Continued enactments |
| Repealed by | Statute Law Revision Act 1867 |
| Relates to | See Expiring laws continuance acts |

Status: Repealed

Text of statute as originally enacted

The Continuance of Laws Act 1737 (11 Geo. 2. c. 18) was an act of the Parliament of Great Britain that continued various older acts.

== Background ==
In the United Kingdom, acts of Parliament remain in force until expressly repealed. Many acts of parliament, however, contained time-limited sunset clauses, requiring legislation to revive enactments that had expired or to continue enactments that would otherwise expire.

== Provisions ==
=== Continued enactments ===
Section 1 of the act continued the Growth of Coffee Act 1731 (5 Geo. 2. c. 24) until the end of the next session of parliament act after 7 years from the expiration of the act.

Section 2 of the act continued the Trade of Sugar Colonies Act 1732 (6 Geo. 2. c. 13) until the end of the next session of parliament act after 7 years from the expiration of the act.

== Legacy ==
The Select Committee on Temporary Laws, Expired or Expiring, appointed in 1796, inspected and considered all temporary laws, observing irregularities in the construction of expiring laws continuance acts, making recommendations and emphasising the importance of the Committee for Expired and Expiring Laws.

The whole act was repealed by section 1 of, and the schedule to, the Statute Law Revision Act 1867 (30 & 31 Vict. c. 59).
