= Continuance of Laws, etc. Act 1742 =

Act of the Parliament of Great Britain

- Act of Parliament
- Parliament of Great Britain
- Long title: An Act for continuing several Laws, relating to the Allowance upon the Exportation of British-made Gunpowder; to the Importation of Naval Stores from the British Colonies in America; to the additional Number of One Hundred Hackney Chairs, and to the Powers given for regulating Hackney Coaches and Chairs; for punishing the Venders of unstamped News Papers; for allowing the Importation of Hemp or Flax manufactured in Ireland, though not sworn to be of the Growth of Ireland; and for the Relief of Bryon Blundell, in respect to the Duty on some White Salt lost in a Storm at Sea.
- Citation: 16 Geo. 2. c. 26
- Territorial extent: Great Britain

Dates
- Royal assent: 21 April 1743
- Commencement: 16 November 1742 (Note: Start of session.)
- Repealed: 15 July 1867

Other legislation
- Amends: See § Continued enactments
- Amended by: London Hackney Carriage Act 1831; Stamp Duties on Newspapers Act 1836
- Repealed by: Statute Law Revision Act 1867
- Relates to: See Expiring laws continuance acts

Status: Repealed

Text of statute as originally enacted

The Continuance of Laws, etc. Act 1742 (16 Geo. 2. c. 26) was an act of the Parliament of Great Britain that continued various older enactments.

== Background ==
In the United Kingdom, acts of Parliament remain in force until expressly repealed. Many acts of parliament, however, contained time-limited sunset clauses, requiring legislation to revive enactments that had expired or to continue enactments that would otherwise expire.

== Provisions ==
Section 1 of the act continued the Exportation Act 1730 (4 Geo. 2. c. 29), as continued by the Customs, etc. Act 1736 (10 Geo. 2. c. 27), from the expiration of the act until the end of the next session of parliament after 24 June 1750.

Section 2 of the act continued the Importation Act 1721 (8 Geo. 1. c. 12) "as relates to the importation of wood and timber, and of the goods commonly known as Lumber, therein enumerated, from any of His Majesty's British plantations or colonies in America, in the manner therein mentioned, from all customs and impositions whatsoever granted to His Majesty, his heirs, or successors" from the expiration of the act until the end of the next session of parliament after 24 June 1750.

Section 3 of the act continued section 12 of the Taxation, etc. Act 1725 (12 Geo. 1. c. 12) "as relates to the additional number of one hundred hackney chairs therein mentioned" from the expiration of the act until the end of the next session of parliament after 24 June 1760.

Section 4 of the act continued the Stamps (No. 2) Act 1710 (9 Ann. c. 16) (Note: This is the citation in The Statutes of the Realm.), section 158 of the Taxation Act 1711 (10 Ann.c. 18) (Note: This is the citation in The Statutes of the Realm.), the Hackney Chairs Act 1712 (12 Ann. c. 15) (Note: This is the citation in The Statutes of the Realm.) and the Hackney Coaches, etc. Act 1715 (1 Geo. 1. St. 2. c. 57) (Note: The margin note cites this as "1 Geo. 1. c. 57".) as relates to "the jurisdiction, powers and authorities of the commissioners for licensing and regulating hackney coaches, and of justices of the peace, and to the rules, penalties and forfeitures, orders and directions therein mentioned" from the expiration of those enactments until the end of the next session of parliament after 24 June 1760.

Section 5 of the act provided that due to revenue losses caused by unauthorized hawkers selling legally-stamped printed materials, after 1 May 1743, anyone selling newspapers or publications related to stamp duties without proper authorization could be arrested, and upon conviction face up to three months imprisonment, with informants receiving a twenty-shilling reward per conviction.

Section 6 of the act amended the Linen Manufacture Act 1695 (7 & 8 Will. 3 regarding Irish flax and hemp imports, providing that all hemp or flax products genuinely manufactured in Ireland could be imported directly into England duty-free after 24 June 1743, provided the ship's master or chief officer presented certificates from Irish port officials verifying the goods' Irish origin and manufacture.

Section 7 of the act provided that due to the Mary Anne Birchet ship, commanded by Captain Joseph Creagh, being loaded with 964 bushels of white salt by Bryan Blundell of Liverpool in August 1741 for transport to Limerick, Ireland (with appropriate duty bonds posted), but subsequently losing 164 bushels to stormy weather, all bonds related to the duty on those lost 164 bushels would be released and cancelled despite any contrary provisions.

== Subsequent developments ==
The Select Committee on Temporary Laws, Expired or Expiring, appointed in 1796, inspected and considered all temporary laws, observing irregularities in the construction of expiring laws continuance acts, making recommendations and emphasising the importance of the Committee for Expired and Expiring Laws.

So much of the act "as in any Manner relates to the licensing or regulating of Hackney Coaches or Chairs" was repealed by section 1 of the London Hackney Carriage Act 1831 (55 Geo. 3. c. 159), which came into force on 5 January 1832.

The whole act was repealed by section 1 of, and the schedule to, the Statute Law Revision Act 1867 (30 & 31 Vict. c. 59), which came into force on 15 July 1867.
