= Continuance of Laws Act 1787 =

Act of the Parliament of Great Britain

- Act of Parliament
- Parliament of Great Britain
- Long title: An Act to continue several Laws relating to the free Importation of certain Raw Hides and Skins from Ireland and the British Plantations in America; to the allowing the Exportation of certain Quantities of Wheat and other Articles to His Majesty's Sugar Colonies in America; to the prohibiting the Exportation of Tools and Utensils made use of in the Iron and Steel Manufactures of this Kingdom, and to prevent the seducing of Artificers and Workmen employed in those Manufactures to go into Parts beyond the Seas; and to the granting a Bounty on the Exportation of certain Species of British and Irish Linens exported, and taking off the Duties on foreign Raw Linen Yarns made of Flax imported.
- Citation: 27 Geo. 3. c. 36
- Territorial extent: Great Britain

Dates
- Royal assent: 30 May 1787
- Commencement: 23 January 1787 (Note: Start of session.)
- Repealed: 21 August 1871

Other legislation
- Amends: See § Continued enactments
- Repealed by: Statute Law Revision Act 1871
- Relates to: See Expiring laws continuance acts

Status: Repealed

Text of statute as originally enacted

The Continuance of Laws Act 1787 (27 Geo. 3. c. 36) was an act of the Parliament of Great Britain that continued various older acts.

== Background ==
In the United Kingdom, acts of Parliament remain in force until expressly repealed. Many acts of parliament, however, contained time-limited sunset clauses, requiring legislation to revive enactments that had expired or to continue enactments that would otherwise expire.

== Provisions ==
=== Continued enactments ===
Section 1 of the act continued the until the Hides and Skins Act 1769 (9 Geo. 3. c. 39) "as relates to the free importation of certain raw hides and skins from Ireland, and the British plantations in America", as continued by the Continuance of Laws, etc. Act 1774 (14 Geo. 3. c. 86) and the Continuance of Laws Act 1781 (21 Geo. 3. c. 29), from the expiration of those enactments until the end of the next session of parliament after 1 June 1791.

Section 2 of the act continued the Exportation Act 1776 (16 Geo. 3. c. 37) "as relates to allowing the exportation of certain quantities of wheat, and other articles to his Majesty's sugar colonies in America", as continued by the Exportation (No. 2) Act 1776 (17 Geo. 3. c. 28), the Exportation Act 1778 (18 Geo. 3. c. 16), the Continuance of Laws Act 1779 (19 Geo. 3. c. 22), the Continuance of Laws (No. 2) Act 1780 (20 Geo. 3. c. 19) and the Continuance of Laws Act 1781 (21 Geo. 3. c. 29), from the passing of the act until 1 May 1788.

Section 3 of the act continued the Exportation (No. 4) Act 1786 (26 Geo. 3. c. 89) from the expiration of the act until the end of the next session of parliament.

Section 4 of the act continued the Exportation Act 1756 (29 Geo. 2. c. 15), as continued by the Exportation (No. 4) Act 1770 (10 Geo. 3. c. 38) and the Bounties Act 1779 (19 Geo. 3. c. 27), from the expiration of the act until the end of the next session of parliament after 24 June 1788.

== Subsequent developments ==
The Select Committee on Temporary Laws, Expired or Expiring, appointed in 1796, inspected and considered all temporary laws, observing irregularities in the construction of expiring laws continuance acts, making recommendations and emphasising the importance of the Committee for Expired and Expiring Laws.

The whole act was repealed by section 1 of, and the schedule to, the Statute Law Revision Act 1871 (34 & 35 Vict. c. 116), which came into force on 21 August 1871.
