= Expiring laws continuance legislation =

Legislation that continues enactments that would otherwise expire

Expiring laws continuance legislation is legislation that continues enactments that would otherwise expire.

== British Guiana ==
See, for example, the Expiring Laws Continuance Ordinance 1934.

== Ceylon ==
See, for example, the Expiring Laws Continuance Ordinance 1904.

== England ==
- Continuance of Laws Act 1702
- Perpetuation and Amendment of Laws Act 1704
- Continuance of Laws Act 1706

== Great Britain ==
- Perpetuation, etc. of Acts 1708
- Continuance of Laws Act 1711
- Poor Act 1712
- Continuance of Laws, etc. Act 1714
- Continuance of Laws Act 1718
- Perpetuation, etc. of Acts 1719
- Continuance of Laws Act 1722
- Continuance of Laws, etc. Act 1723
- Continuance of Laws, etc. Act 1724
- Continuance of Laws, etc. Act 1726
- Unlawful Games Act 1728
- Perpetuation of Various Laws Act 1732
- Continuance of Laws Act 1734
- Continuance of Laws (No. 2) Act 1734
- Continuance, etc., of Acts, 1735
- Continuance of Laws Act 1737
- Laws Continuance, etc. Act 1739
- Continuance of Laws, etc. Act 1739
- Continuance of Laws Act 1740
- Starr and Bent Act 1741
- Making of Sail Cloth, etc. Act 1741
- Continuance of Laws, etc. Act 1742
- Universities (Wine Licences) Act 1743
- Continuance of Laws Act 1746
- Insolvent Debtors Relief, etc. Act 1747
- Continuance of Laws, etc. Act 1748
- Continuance of Laws, etc. Act 1749
- Continuance of Laws Act 1750
- Continuance of Laws, etc. Act 1753
- Justices' Clerks' Fees (Middlesex) Act 1754
- Continuance of Laws etc., Act 1754
- Continuance of Laws, etc. Act 1757
- Continuance of Laws Act 1759
- Continuance etc. of Acts Act 1763
- Continuance of Laws Act 1763
- Continuance of Laws (No. 2) Act 1763
- Continuance of Laws Act 1768
- Continuance of Certain Laws, etc. Act 1771
- Continuance of Certain Laws Act 1772
- Continuance of Laws, etc. Act 1774
- Continuance of Laws Act 1776
- Continuance of Laws (No. 2) Act 1776
- Continuance of Laws Act 1778
- Continuance of Laws Act 1779
- Continuance of Laws Act 1780
- Continuance of Laws (No. 2) Act 1780
- Continuance of Laws Act 1786
- Continuance of Laws Act 1787
- Continuance of Laws Act 1788
- Continuance of Laws (No. 2) Act 1788
- Continuance of Laws Act 1789
- Continuance of Laws Act 1790
- Continuance of Laws, etc. Act 1791

=== Continuance of Laws, etc. Act 1714 ===
Continuance of Laws, etc. Act 1714
- Act of Parliament
- Parliament of Great Britain
- Long title: An Act for continuing several Laws therein mentioned, relating to Coals, Hemp, and Flax, Irish and Scotch Linen, and the Assize of Bread; and for giving Power to adjourn the Quarter Sessions for the County of Anglesea, for the Purposes therein mentioned.
- Citation: 1 Geo. 1. St. 2. c. 26
- Territorial extent: Great Britain

Dates
- Royal assent: 21 September 1715
- Commencement: 17 March 1715 (Note: Start of session.)
- Repealed: 13 July 1871
Other legislation
Amends	See § Continued enactments
Repealed by	Promissory Oaths Act 1871
Relates to	See Expiring laws continuance acts

Status: Repealed

Text of statute as originally enacted

The Continuance of Laws, etc. Act 1714 (1 Geo. 1. St. 2. c. 26) was an act of the Parliament of Great Britain that continued and made perpetual various older acts.

Section 1 of the act made the Coal Trade Act 1710 (9 Ann. c. 28) (Note: This is the citation in The Statutes at Large.) perpetual.

Section 2 of the act made the Tithes of Hemp and Flax Act 1698 (11 & 12 Will. 3 c. 16), as continued by the Tithes Act 1707 (6 Ann. c. 28) perpetual.

Section 3 of the act continued the Exportations, etc. Act 1704 (3 & 4 Ann. c. 8) as relates to the liberty of exporting Irish linen to the West Indies until the end of the next session of parliament after 1 year.

Section 4 of the act continued the Price and Assise of Bread Act 1709 (8 Ann. c. 18) until the end of the next session of parliament after 3 years.

Section 5 of the act amended the Price and Assise of Bread Act 1709 (8 Ann. c. 18), repealing the penalty in that act, providing that after 1 September 1715, bakers making bread deficient in weight shall forfeit for every ounce 5s and wanting less 2s, 6d.

Section 6 of the act amended the Price and Assise of Bread Act 1709 (8 Ann. c. 18), providing that after 1 September 1715, bakers must make peck loaves according to the assize table in that act.

Section 7 of the act amended the Price and Assise of Bread Act 1709 (8 Ann. c. 18), providing that after 1 September 1715, prices of grain, meal and flour must be certified on oath before the Lord Mayor (or for London, the Court of the Lord Mayor and Aldermen).

Section 8 of the act provided that justices may adjourn the quarter sessions of Anglesea, for the ease of taking such the oaths.

=== Continuance of Laws Act 1718 ===
Continuance of Laws Act 1718
- Act of Parliament
- Parliament of Great Britain
- Long title: An Act for continuing the Act made in the Eighth Year of the Reign of the late Queen Anne,[c] to regulate the Price and Assize of Bread; and for continuing the Act made in the Twelfth Year of Her said late Majesty's Reign,[d] for the better Encouragement of the making Sail Cloth in Great Britain.
- Citation: 5 Geo. 1. c. 25
- Territorial extent: Great Britain

Dates
- Royal assent: 18 April 1719
- Commencement: 11 November 1718
- Repealed: 15 July 1867
Other legislation
Amends	See § Continued enactments
Repealed by	Statute Law Revision Act 1867
Relates to	See Expiring laws continuance acts

Status: Repealed

Text of statute as originally enacted

The Continuance of Laws Act 1718 (5 Geo. 1. c. 25) was an act of the Parliament of Great Britain that continued various older acts.

Section 1 of the act continued the Price and Assise of Bread Act 1709 (8 Ann. c. 18), as continued by the Continuance of Laws, etc. Act 1714 (1 Geo. 1. St. 2. c. 26), until the end of the next session of parliament after 5 years.

Section 2 of the act continued the Sail Cloth Manufacture Act 1712 (12 Ann. St. 1 c. 16), as continued by the Continuance of Laws, etc. Act 1714 (1 Geo. 1. St. 2. c. 26), until the end of the next session of parliament after 7 years.

=== Continuance of Laws Act 1722 ===
Continuance of Laws Act 1722
- Act of Parliament
- Parliament of Great Britain
- Long title: An Act for continuing some Laws; and reviving others, therein mentioned; for exempting Apothecaries from serving Parish and Ward Offices, and upon Juries; and relating to Jurors; and to the Payment of Seamen's Wages; and the Preservation of Naval Stores and Stores of War; and concerning the Militia and Trophy-money; and against clandestine Running of uncustomed Goods; and for more effectual preventing Frauds relating to the Customs, and Frauds in mixing Silk with Stuffs to be exported.
- Citation: 9 Geo. 1. c. 8
- Territorial extent: Great Britain

Dates
- Royal assent: 22 March 1723
- Commencement: 9 October 1722
- Repealed: 29 June 1875
Other legislation
Amends	See § Revived and continued enactments
Amended by	Unlawful Games Act 1728; Continuance of Laws Act 1734; Making of Sail Cloth, etc. Act 1741; Naval and Victualling Stores Act 1862
Repealed by	Public Stores Act 1875
Relates to	See Expiring laws continuance acts

Status: Repealed

Text of statute as originally enacted

The Continuance of Laws Act 1722 (9 Geo. 1. c. 8) was an act of the Parliament of the United Kingdom that revived, continued and made perpetual various older acts.

Section 1 of the act made the Exemptions of Apothecaries Act 1694 (6 & 7 Will. 3. c. 4) perpetual.

Section 2 of the act continued the Estreats (Personal Representatives) Act 1692 (4 & 5 Will. & Mar. c. 24) as modified by the Perpetuation and Amendment of Laws Act 1704 (3 & 4 Ann. c. 18) and continued by the Continuance of Laws Act 1711 (10 Ann. c. 14), as relates to jurors and to the returns and services of jurors, until the end of the next session of parliament after 7 years from the expiration of those enactments.

Section 3 of the act revived and made perpetual from 25 March 1723 the Navy, etc. Act 1714 (1 Geo. 1. St. 2. c. 25) and amended the Embezzlement of Public Stores Act 1697 (9 Will. 3. c. 41) (Note: This is the citation in The Statutes of the Realm.) providing that after 25 March 1723 any person caught stealing timber from public stores would be made to forfeit and pay under the terms of the act.

Section 4 of the act provided that judges and justices may mitigate penalties for offenders by committing them to jail without bail until payment, ordering public whipping, or sentencing them to workhouses for up to six months at the court's discretion.

Section 5 of the act provided that when disputes arise between informants or witnesses in cases related to the act, particularly regarding rights to forfeitures or penalties, the presiding judge or justices shall examine and determine the matter.

Section 6 of the act revived and continued the Militia Act 1714 (1 Geo. 1. St. 2. c. 14) until the end of the next session of parliament after 3 years from 25 March 1273.

Section 7 of the act amended section 3 of the Militia Act 1714 (1 Geo. 1. St. 2. c. 14), providing lieutenants and deputy lieutenants in England could appoint different lengths and sizes of muskets for foot soldiers in the militia, beyond the previously prescribed five-foot barrel length, while still requiring proper arms and accoutrements under the penalties mentioned in the original act.

Section 8 of the act continued sections 3, 4, 6, 7 8, 10, 2 and 5 of the Adulteration of Coffee Act 1718 (5 Geo. 1. c. 11) until the end of the next session of parliament after 5 years from the expiration of those enactments.

Section 9 of the act amended section 3 of the Silk Subsidies, Various Duties, Import of Furs, etc. Act 1721 (8 Geo. 1. c. 15) (Note: The margin note incorrectly cites this as "8 Geo. 1. c. 25".), providing that export allowances for silk manufactures would only apply to products where at least two-thirds of the warp threads were either all silk or mixed with silk, to prevent fraud by manufacturers who previously added minimal silk only at edges to claim bounties contrary to the act's intent.

Section 10 of the act provided that any person entering or shipping goods without the required silk content would forfeit the goods and be prosecuted for double their value, with the seizure and penalty to be handled as directed for other penalties under the act.

The last two sections of the act were continued until the end of the next session of parliament after 29 September 1734 by section 4 of the Unlawful Games Act 1728 (2 Geo. 2. c. 28), then until the end of the next session of parliament after 25 March 1742 by section 3 of the Continuance of Laws Act 1734 (8 Geo. 2. c. 18), and then until the end of the next session of parliament after 25 March 1742 by section 3 of the Making of Sail Cloth, etc. Act 1741 (15 Geo. 2. c. 35).

Sections 3, 4 and 5 of the act were repealed by section 4 of, and schedule A to, the Naval and Victualling Stores Act 1862 (25 & 26 Vict. c. 64), which came into force on 29 July 1862.

=== Continuance of Laws, etc. Act 1724 ===
Continuance of Laws, etc. Act 1724
- Act of Parliament
- Parliament of Great Britain
- Long title: An Act to continue several Acts therein mentioned, for preventing Frauds committed by Bankrupts; for encouraging the Silk Manufactures of this Kingdom; for preventing the clandestine Running of Goods; for making Copper Ore of the British Plantations an enumerated Commodity; and for explaining and amending a late Act,[j] for more effectual Punishment of such as shall wilfully burn or destroy Ships.
- Citation: 11 Geo. 1. c. 29
- Territorial extent: Great Britain

Dates
- Royal assent: 31 May 1725
- Commencement: 31 May 1725
- Repealed: 15 July 1867
Other legislation
Amends	See § Continued enactments
Repealed by	Statute Law Revision Act 1867
Relates to	Offences at Sea Act 1536; See Expiring laws continuance acts

Status: Repealed

Text of statute as originally enacted

The Continuance of Laws, etc. Act 1724 (11 Geo. 1. c. 29) was an act of the Parliament of Great Britain that continued various older acts.

Section 1 of the act continued the Bankrupts Act 1718 (5 Geo. 1. c. 24) until the end of the next session of parliament after 1 year.

Section 2 of the act continued the Silk Subsidies, Various Duties, Import of Furs, etc. Act 1721 (8 Geo. 1. c. 15) until the end of the next session of parliament after 3 years.

Section 3 of the act made the last two clauses of the Continuance of Laws Act 1722 (9 Geo. 1. c. 8) in full force.

Section 4 of the act continued the Customs, etc. Act 1721 (8 Geo. 1. c. 18) until the end of the next session of parliament after 3 years, except as relates to ships or vessels performing quarantine.

Section 5 of the act amended the Stranded Ships, etc. Act 1717 (4 Geo. 1. c. 12) making it a capital offense for ship owners, captains, or officers who wilfully destroy their vessels after 24 June 1718, to the detriment of insurers or merchants with goods aboard.

Section 6 of the act provided that any ship owner, captain, officer or mariner who wilfully destroys their vessel after 24 June 1725, with intent to defraud insurers, merchants with cargo, or vessel co-owners shall be convicted as felons and executed without benefit of clergy.

Section 7 of the act provided that offences of wilfully destroying ships would be tried in the same courts as other felonies if committed within a county, while those committed on the high seas would be tried according to the procedures established in the Offences at Sea Act 1536 (28 Hen. 8. c. 15).

=== Continuance of Laws, etc. Act 1726 ===
Continuance of Laws, etc. Act 1726
- Act of Parliament
- Parliament of Great Britain
- Long title: An Act for continuing the Laws therein mentioned, relating to Copper Bars exported; and for better preventing Frauds committed by Bankrupts; and for searching Drugs and Compositions for Medicines.
- Citation: 13 Geo. 1. c. 27
- Territorial extent: Great Britain

Dates
- Royal assent: 15 May 1727
- Commencement: 17 January 1727
- Repealed: 15 July 1867
Other legislation
Amends	See § Continued enactments
Repealed by	Statute Law Revision Act 1867
Relates to	See Expiring laws continuance acts

Status: Repealed

Text of statute as originally enacted

The Continuance of Laws, etc. Act 1726 (13 Geo. 1. c. 27) was an act of the Parliament of Great Britain that continued various older enactments.

Section 1 of the act continued the clause in the Trade with Africa Act 1697 (9 Will. 3. c. 26) "for allowing a drawback of the duties upon the exportation of copper bars imported", as revived and continued by the Poor Act 1712 (12 Ann. c. 18), and the provision in the Poor Act 1712 (12 Ann. c. 18) that provided that drawback on copper would be allowed on imports from the East Indies and the coast of Barbary, until the end of the next session of parliament after 14 years from the expiration of those enactments.

Section 2 of the act continued the Bankrupts Act 1718 (5 Geo. 1. c. 24), as continued by the Continuance of Laws, etc. Act 1724 (11 Geo. 1. c. 29), until the end of the next session of parliament after 1 year from the expiration of the act.

Section 3 of the act continued the Examination of Drugs Act 1723 (10 Geo. 1. c. 20) until the end of the next session of parliament after 3 years from the expiration of the act.

=== Perpetuation of Various Laws Act 1732 ===
Perpetuation of Various Laws Act 1732
- Act of Parliament
- Parliament of Great Britain
- Long title: An Act for making perpetual the several Acts therein mentioned, for the better Regulation of Juries; and for empowering the Justices of Session or Assizes, for the Counties Palatine of Chester, Lancaster, and Durham, to appoint a Special Jury, in Manner therein mentioned; and for continuing the Act for regulating the Manufacture of Cloth in the West Riding of the County of York, except a Clause therein contained; and for continuing an Act for the more effectual punishing wicked and evil-disposed Persons going armed in Disguise, and for other Purposes therein mentioned; and to prevent the cutting or breaking down the Bank of any River, or any Sea Bank; and to prevent the malicious cutting of Hop-binds; and for continuing an Act made in the Thirteenth and Fourteenth Years of the Reign of King Charles the Second, for preventing Theft and Rapine on the Northern Borders of England; and for reviving and continuing certain Clauses in Two other Acts, made for the same Purpose.
- Citation: 6 Geo. 2. c. 37
- Territorial extent: Great Britain

Dates
- Royal assent: 13 June 1733
- Commencement: 16 January 1733
- Repealed: 15 July 1867
Other legislation
Amends	See § Revived and continued enactments
Amended by	Offences Against Persons and Property Act 1736; Universities (Wine Licences) Act 1743; Continuance of Laws (No.2) Act 1750; Continuance, etc., of Acts, 1757; Capital Punishments, etc. Act 1823
Repealed by	Statute Law Revision Act 1867
Relates to	See Expiring laws continuance acts

Status: Repealed

Text of statute as originally enacted

The Perpetuation of Various Laws Act 1732 (6 Geo. 2. c. 37) was an act of the Parliament of the United Kingdom that made perpetual, revived and continued various older enactments.

==== Revived and continued enactments ====
Section 1 of the act made the Juries Act 1729 (3 Geo. 2. c. 25) and the Juries Act 1730 (4 Geo. 2. c. 7) perpetual.

Section 2 of the act provided that justices in the counties palatine of Chester, Lancaster and Durham could, upon motion by the Crown, prosecutors, defendants, or plaintiffs in legal proceedings, order and appoint a special jury to be struck for trials in their respective courts, following the same procedures as special juries used in Westminster courts.

Section 3 of the act continued the Cloth Manufacturer Act 1724 (11 Geo. 1. c. 24), from the expiration of the act until the end of the next session of parliament after 1 September 1740, except "as restrains any person, not having served seven years as an apprentice to the trade or broad clothing, or not having exercised and used such trade for the space of two years before the commencement of the said act, except as therein is excepted, from making or causing to be made any broad cloth in the said west riding, under the penalties therein mentioned".

Section 4 of the act continued the Criminal Law Act 1722 (9 Geo. 1. c. 22), as continued by the Continuance of 9 Geo. 1. c. 22 Act 1725 (12 Geo. 1. c. 30), from the expiration of the act until the end of the next session of parliament after 1 September 1736.

Section 5 of the act continued the provided that any person who, from 24 June 1733 onwards, unlawfully and maliciously broke down or cut down river banks or sea banks causing lands to be overflowed or damaged, would upon conviction be adjudged guilty of felony and suffer death without benefit of clergy.

Section 6 of the act provided that any person who, from 24 June 1733 onwards and during the continuance of the Criminal Law Act 1722 (9 Geo. 1. c. 22), unlawfully and maliciously cut hop-binds growing on poles in any hop plantation would upon conviction be adjudged guilty of felony and suffer death without benefit of clergy.

Section 7 of the act continued the Moss Troopers Act 1662 (14 Cha. 2. c. 22) from the expiration of the act until the end of the next session of parliament after 1 September 1744.

Section 8 of the act provided that the Moss Troopers Act 1662 (14 Cha. 2. c. 22) would be deemed as a public act.

Section 9 of the act revived and continued the Moss Troopers Act 1666 (18 & 19 Cha. 2. c. 3) as provided that "the benefit of clergy is taken away from great, known and notorious thieves and spoil-takers in the counties of Northumberland and Cumberland, or either of them, during the continuance of the said act, who shall be duly convicted for theft done or committed within the said counties, or either of them, or otherwise; that it should and might be lawful for the justices of the assizes and commissioners of Oyer and Terminer or gaol delivery, before whom such offenders should be convicted within the said counties, or either of them, to transport or cause to be transported the said offenders, and every of them, into any of his Majesty's dominions in America, there to remain and not return" and the Moss Troopers Act 1677 (29 & 30 Cha. 2. c. 2) as provided that "the several justices of the peace of the said respective counties of Northumberland and Cumberland are impowered from time to time, at the respective quarter-sessions, to take good and sufficient security of the person or persons by them employed in the said service for the preservation of the said respective counties from theft and rapine, to answer the damages sustained by any person or persons by his or their neglect or default therein, and to pay and satisfy the same within four months after that proof thereof should have been made by the oath of one or more credible witness or witnesses, before the justices of the peace of the said respective counties, at the next quarter-sessions in the respective county (which oath or oaths the said justice or justices are thereby authorized to administer) so as the goods stolen were entred in one of the books to be kept for that purpose, within the space of forty eight hours after the same should have been stolen or gone: and it is thereby enacted, that books should be kept for that end in every market town of the said respective counties, and at such other convenient places therein, and by such person or persons as the said justices of the peace in the said respective counties, at their general sessions of the peace, should order or appoint, and also that the said several justices of the peace of the said respective counties, at the general quarter sessions of the peace for the said counties respectively, should yearly, or every two years at the farthest, in open court, make choice of and appoint such person or persons, as they should respectively think fit, for the said counties respectively, to be employed in the said service" from 24 June 1733 until the end of the next session of parliament after 1 September 1744.

Section 10 of the act provided that the clauses of the Moss Troopers Act 1666 (18 & 19 Cha. 2. c. 3) and the Moss Troopers Act 1677 (29 & 30 Cha. 2. c. 2) continued in section 9 of the act would be deemed as public acts.

==== Legacy ====
So much of the act as relates to the Moss Troopers Act 1662 (14 Cha. 2. c. 22) or "for the more effectual prevention of theft and rapine upon the northern borders of England" was continued from the expiration of those enactments until the end of the next session of parliament after 24 June 1751 by section 1 of the Universities (Wine Licences) Act 1743 (17 Geo. 2. c. 40).

Section 5 of the act "that if any person or persons, during the continuance of the said act made in the said ninth year of the reign of his said late majesty King George the First, shall unlawfully and maliciously break or cut down the bank or banks of any river, or any sea banks, whereby any lands shall be overflowed or damaged, every such person being thereof lawfully convicted, shall be adjudged guilty of felony, and shall suffer death, without benefit of clergy", was continued from the expiration of that enactment until the end of the next session of parliament after 24 June 1751 by section 4 of the Universities (Wine Licences) Act 1743 (17 Geo. 2. c. 40).

Section 6 of the act "that if any person or persons, during the continuance of the said act made in the ninth year of the reign of his said late majesty King George the First, shall unlawfully and maliciously cut any hop-binds, growing on poles in any plantation of hops, every such person or persons, being thereof lawfully convicted, shall be guilty of felony, and shall suffer death without benefit of clergy" was continued from the expiration of that enactment until the end of the next session of parliament after 24 June 1751 by section 5 of the Universities (Wine Licences) Act 1743 (17 Geo. 2. c. 40).

Section 6 of the act "to prevent the malicious cutting of hop-binds growing on poles in any plantation of hops" was continued from the expiration of that enactment until the end of the next session of parliament after 1 September 1757 by section 4 of the Continuance of Laws (No.2) Act 1750 (24 Geo. 2. c. 57).

Section 6 of the act "to prevent the malicious cutting of hop-binds growing on poles in any plantation of hops" was continued from the expiration of that enactment until the end of the next session of parliament after 1 September 1757 by section 4 of the Continuance of Laws (No.2) Act 1750 (24 Geo. 2. c. 57).

So much of the act as relates to the Moss Troopers Act 1662 (14 Cha. 2. c. 22) was made perpetual by section 1 of the Continuance, etc., of Acts, 1757 (31 Geo. 2. c. 42).

Section 5 of the act "to prevent the cutting or breaking down the bank of any river or sea bank" was made perpetual by section 3 of the Continuance, etc., of Acts, 1757 (31 Geo. 2. c. 42).

Section 6 of the act "to prevent the malicious cutting of hop-binds growing on poles in any plantation of hops" was made perpetual by section 4 of the Continuance, etc., of Acts, 1757 (31 Geo. 2. c. 42).

=== Continuance, etc., of Acts, 1735 ===
Continuance, etc., of Acts, 1735
- Act of Parliament
- Parliament of Great Britain
- Long title: An Act for reviving and continuing the Acts therein mentioned; and for explaining and amending a Clause in an Act made in the First Year of the Reign of His late Majesty King George the First, intituled, "An Act for making the Laws for repairing the Highways more effectual," relating to the appointing Scavengers in Cities and Market Towns, and the ordering the Assessments for the repairing and cleansing the Streets therein.
- Citation: 9 Geo. 2. c. 18
- Territorial extent: Great Britain

Dates
- Royal assent: 5 May 1736
- Commencement: 15 January 1736
- Repealed: 15 July 1867
Other legislation
Repealed by	Statute Law Revision Act 1867

Status: Repealed

Text of statute as originally enacted

The act 9 Geo. 2. c. 18, sometimes called Continuance, etc., of Acts, 1735, made perpetual, revived and continued various older enactments. Section 1 revived and made the Perjury Act 1728 (2 Geo. 2. c. 25) perpetual from 24 June 1735. Section 2 continued the Bankrupts Act 1731 (5 Geo. 2. c. 30) from the expiration of the act until the end of the next session of parliament after 29 September 1743. Section 3 extended the powers under the Highways Act 1715 (1 Geo. 1. St. 2. c. 52) to appoint street scavengers and levy taxes for street cleaning and repair to all market towns, not just cities. The whole act was repealed by section 1 of, and the schedule to, the Statute Law Revision Act 1867 (30 & 31 Vict. c. 59).

=== Continuance of Laws Act 1780 ===
Continuance of Laws Act 1780
- Act of Parliament
- Parliament of Great Britain
- Long title: An Act for continuing an Act made in the last Session of Parliament, for allowing the Importation of fine organzined Italian thrown Silk, in any Ships or Vessels, for a limited Time.
- Citation: 20 Geo. 3. c. 4
- Territorial extent: Great Britain

Dates
- Royal assent: 15 December 1779
- Commencement: 25 November 1779
- Repealed: 21 August 1871
Other legislation
Amends	See § Continued enactments
Repealed by	Statute Law Revision Act 1871
Relates to	Continuance of Laws Act 1702; Perpetuation and Amendment of Laws Act 1704; Continuance of Laws Act 1706; Perpetuation, etc. of Acts 1708; Continuance of Laws Act 1711; Poor Act 1712; Continuance of Laws, etc. Act 1714; Continuance of Laws Act 1718; Perpetuation, etc. of Acts 1719; Continuance of Laws Act 1722; Continuance of Laws, etc. Act 1723; Continuance of Laws, etc. Act 1724; Continuance of Laws, etc. Act 1726; Unlawful Games Act 1728; Perpetuation of Various Laws Act 1732; Continuance of Laws Act 1734; Continuance of Laws (No. 2) Act 1734; Continuance, etc., of Acts, 1735; Continuance of Laws Act 1737; Laws Continuance, etc. Act 1739; Continuance of Laws, etc. Act 1739; Continuance of Laws Act 1740; Starr and Bent Act 1741; Making of Sail Cloth, etc. Act 1741; Continuance of Laws, etc. Act 1742; Universities (Wine Licences) Act 1743; Continuance of Laws Act 1746; Insolvent Debtors Relief, etc. Act 1747; Continuance of Laws, etc. Act 1748; Continuance of Laws, etc. Act 1749; Continuance of Laws Act 1750; Continuance of Laws (No. 2) Act 1750; Continuance of Laws, etc. Act 1753; Justices' Clerks' Fees (Middlesex) Act 1754; Continuance of Laws etc., Act 1754; Continuance of Laws Act 1756; Continuance of Laws, etc. Act 1757; Continuance of Laws, etc., (No. 2) Act 1757; Passage from Charing Cross Act 1757; Continuance, etc., of Acts, 1757; Continuance of Laws Act 1758; Continuance of Laws Act 1759; Continuance etc. of Acts Act 1763; Continuance of Laws Act 1763; Continuance of Laws (No. 2) Act 1763; Continuance of Laws Act 1766; Continuance of Laws (No. 2) Act 1766; Continuance of Laws Act 1768; Continuance of Certain Laws, etc. Act 1771; Continuance of Certain Laws Act 1772; Continuance of Laws Act 1774; Continuance of Laws (No. 2) Act 1774; Continuance of Laws, etc. Act 1774; Continuance of Laws Act 1776; Continuance of Laws Act 1776; Continuance of Laws Act 1778; Continuance of Laws Act 1779; Continuance of Laws (No. 2) Act 1780; Continuance of Laws Act 1781; Continuance of Laws Act 1782; Continuance of Laws Act 1783; Continuance of Laws Act 1786; Continuance of Laws (No. 2) Act 1786; Continuance of Laws Act 1787; Continuance of Laws Act 1788; Continuance of Laws (No. 2) Act 1788; Continuance of Laws Act 1789; Continuance of Laws Act 1790; Continuance of Laws, etc. Act 1791; Continuance of Laws Act 1792; Continuance of Laws Act 1793; Continuance of Laws Act 1794; Continuance of Laws Act 1795; Continuance of Laws Act 1796; Continuance of Laws (No. 2) Act 1796; Continuance of Laws Act 1797; Continuance of Laws (No. 2) Act 1797; Continuance of Laws Act 1798; Continuance of Laws Act 1799 (39 Geo. 3. c. 12); Continuance of Laws (No. 2) Act 1799; Continuance of Laws Act 1799 (39 & 40 Geo. 3. c. 9)

Status: Repealed

Text of statute as originally enacted

The Continuance of Laws Act 1780 (20 Geo. 3. c. 4) was an act of the Parliament of the United Kingdom that continued various older acts.

Section 1 of the act continued the Importation of Silk Act 1779 (19 Geo. 3. c. 9) from the expiration of the act until the end of the next session of parliament after 25 March 1781.

== United Kingdom ==
There was an annual Expiring Laws Continuance Act. As of about 1902 or 1903, the "long schedule to" this annual Act had "been little altered, except by additions, for the last forty years".

The system of continuing temporary laws was criticised by The Law Times in 1888. Lely said there was an important debate on the Bill for the Expiring Laws Continuance Act 1902.

The last act named "Expiring Laws Continuance Act" was enacted in 1970, and affected portions of three acts due to expire at the end of that year. Two of these three — portions of the Aliens Restriction (Amendment) Act 1919 and Commonwealth Immigrants Act 1962 — were continued until the end of 1971, by which time it was expected that an Immigration Bill would allow them to be repealed. The third expiring law was Part VII of the Licensing Act 1964. The 1970 continuance bill as introduced proposed to continue the 1964 law also for one year, but that left the prospect of needing to pass another Expiring Laws Continuance Act in 1971 for the sole purpose of continuing one part of a single act; so for convenience, the 1970 continuance act made Part VII of the 1964 act permanent. It remained in force (with amendments) until the entire Licensing Act 1964 was repealed by the Licensing Act 2003.

== Ireland ==
After the Irish Free State left the United Kingdom in 1922, it passed its own continuance acts; first the Expiring Laws Continuance Act 1922 and then an Expiring Laws Act annually from 1923 to 1952. The Expiring Laws Act 1952 continued only three acts and one section of a fourth: the Parliamentary Elections Act 1868 and Corrupt Practices Commission Expenses Act 1869 had been passed by the British Parliament; the Local Authorities (Combined Purchasing) Act 1925 by the Free State Oireachtas, and section 65 of the Local Government Act 1941 by the Oireachtas after its 1937 reconstitution. The 1952 act continued all four until 1960, by which time the Electoral Act 1960 had continued the 1868 and 1869 acts indefinitely; they were finally repealed in 1992.
