= Continuance of Laws Act 1750 =

Act of the Parliament of Great Britain

- Act of Parliament
- Parliament of Great Britain
- Long title: An Act for continuing several Laws therein mentioned, relating to the Premiums upon the Importation of Masts, Yards, and Bowsprits, Tar, Pitch, and Turpentine, to British-made Sail Cloth, and the Duties payable on Foreign Sail Cloth, and to the Allowance upon the Exportation of British-made Gunpowder.
- Citation: 24 Geo. 2. c. 52
- Territorial extent: Great Britain

Dates
- Royal assent: 25 June 1751
- Commencement: 17 January 1751 (Note: Start of session.)
- Repealed: 15 July 1867
Other legislation
Amends	See § Continued enactments
Repealed by	Statute Law Revision Act 1867
Relates to	See Expiring laws continuance acts

Status: Repealed

Text of statute as originally enacted

The Continuance of Laws Act 1750 (24 Geo. 2. c. 52) was an act of the Parliament of Great Britain that continued various older enactments.

== Background ==
In the United Kingdom, acts of Parliament remain in force until expressly repealed. Many acts of parliament, however, contained time-limited sunset clauses, requiring legislation to revive enactments that had expired or to continue enactments that would otherwise expire.

== Provisions ==
=== Continued enactments ===
Section 1 of the act continued the Preservation of Woods, America Act 1728 (2 Geo. 2. c. 35) "as relates to the Premiums upon malts, yards, and bowsprits, tar, pitch and turpentine", as continued by the Continuance of Laws, etc. Act 1739 (13 Geo. 2. c. 28), from the expiration of those enactments until the end of the next session of parliament after 25 December 1751.

Section 2 of the act provided that no bounty would be paid on tar unless each barrel contains 31.5 gallons.

Section 3 of the act continued the Manufacture of Sail Cloth Act 1735 (9 Geo. 2. c. 37), the Continuance of Laws, etc. Act 1739 (13 Geo. 2. c. 28), from the expiration of the act until the end of the next session of parliament after 25 December 1757.

Section 4 of the act continued the Exportation Act 1730 (4 Geo. 2. c. 29), as continued by the Customs, etc. Act 1736 (10 Geo. 2. c. 27) and the Continuance of Laws, etc. Act 1742 (16 Geo. 2. c. 26), from the expiration of the act until the end of the next session of parliament after 24 June 1757.

== Subsequent developments ==
The Select Committee on Temporary Laws, Expired or Expiring, appointed in 1796, inspected and considered all temporary laws, observing irregularities in the construction of expiring laws continuance acts, making recommendations and emphasising the importance of the Committee for Expired and Expiring Laws.

The whole act was repealed by section 1 of, and the schedule to, the Statute Law Revision Act 1867 (30 & 31 Vict. c. 59).
