= Continuance of Laws, etc. Act 1739 =

Act of the Parliament of Great Britain

- Act of Parliament
- Parliament of Great Britain
- Long title: An Act for continuing the several Laws therein mentioned, relating to the Premiums upon the Importation of Masts, Yards, and Bowsprits, Tar, Pitch, and Turpentine; to British-made Sail Cloth, and the Duties payable on Foreign Sail Cloth; to the Greenland and to the Whale Fishery; for granting a further Bounty for all Ships employed in the Whale Fishery during the present War; for exempting Harponeers and others, employed in the Greenland Fishery Trade, from being impressed; and for giving further Time for the Payment of Duties omitted to be paid for the Indentures and Contracts of Clerks and Apprentices.
- Citation: 13 Geo. 2. c. 28
- Territorial extent: Great Britain

Dates
- Royal assent: 29 April 1740
- Commencement: 15 November 1739 (Note: Start of session.)
- Repealed: 15 July 1867
Other legislation
Amends	See § Continued enactments
Repealed by	Statute Law Revision Act 1867
Relates to	See Expiring laws continuance acts

Status: Repealed

Text of statute as originally enacted

The Continuance of Laws, etc. Act 1739 (13 Geo. 2. c. 28) was an act of the Parliament of Great Britain that continued various older acts.

== Background ==
In the United Kingdom, acts of Parliament remain in force until expressly repealed. Many acts of parliament, however, contained time-limited sunset clauses, requiring legislation to revive enactments that had expired or to continue enactments that would otherwise expire.

== Provisions ==
=== Continued enactments ===
Section 1 of the act continued the Preservation of Woods, America Act 1728 (25 Geo. 2. c. 35), "as relates to the Premiums upon Malts, Yards and Bowsprits, Tar, Pitch and Turpentine" from the expiration of those enactments until the end of the next session of parliament after 25 December 1750.

Section 2 of the act continued the Manufacture of Sail Cloth Act 1735 (9 Geo. 2. c. 37) from the expiration of the act until the end of the next session of parliament after 25 December 1750.

Section 3 of the act continued the Greenland Fishery Act 1731 (5 Geo. 2. c. 28) from the expiration of the act until the end of the next session of parliament after 25 December 1750.

Section 4 of the act continued the Whale Fishery Act 1732 (6 Geo. 2. c. 33) from the expiration of the act until the end of the next session of parliament after 25 December 1750.

Section 5 of the act provided that during wartime, an additional bounty of ten shillings per ton would be paid to masters or owners of Greenland whaling vessels, beyond the existing twenty shillings bounty, and protected harpooners, line-managers, and seamen in the Greenland fishery from impressment, allowing them to work in the coal trade when not whaling if they provided security to return to whaling.

Section 6 of the act provided that people who had neglected to pay stamp duties on apprenticeship or clerkship indentures, or omitted to record the full sums paid for such positions, could rectify these omissions by paying the required duties before 1 August 1740, and having the documents stamped before 29 September 1740, thereby validating the agreements and avoiding penalties.

== Legacy ==
The Select Committee on Temporary Laws, Expired or Expiring, appointed in 1796, inspected and considered all temporary laws, observing irregularities in the construction of expiring laws continuance acts, making recommendations and emphasising the importance of the Committee for Expired and Expiring Laws.

The whole act was repealed by section 1 of, and the schedule to, the Statute Law Revision Act 1867 (30 & 31 Vict. c. 59).
