= Temporary law =

Laws whose duration is limited at the time of enactment

Temporary laws, temporary legislation or sunset legislation are laws whose duration is limited at the time of enactment. Temporary laws are often used to adapt for unusual or peculiar situations. Clauses limiting the duration of such laws are often called "sunset" clauses.

Temporary laws are commonly given temporal validity by the inclusion of an expiration date at which the law ceases to be in effect unless it is extended. But a law can also acquire temporal status by stipulating that it only applies to a certain event. For example, only to the next election or only for victims of a named catastrophe.

Temporary laws are favored by adherents of experimentalist governance because it allows policy makers to conduct experiments and evaluate the effects of introducing legislation.

Temporary laws are often easier to pass since they last for a shorter time.

Temporary law should not be confused with ratione temporis or temporal jurisdiction, which refer to the jurisdiction of a court of law in relation to the passage of time.

== Examples ==
Some examples of temporary laws:

- May Laws, enacted in Russia in 1882. Originally intended to expire after one year but were extended indefinitely.
- Tehcir Law, enacted by the Ottoman Empire in 1915 authorized the ethnic cleansing of the empire's Armenian population.
- Violent Crime Control and Law Enforcement Act passed in 1994 contained several provisions that were temporary in nature.
- Patriot Act, enacted in the United States in 2001.
- Citizenship and Entry into Israel Law, enacted in Israel in 2003.
