= Continuance of Laws Act 1796 =

Act of the Parliament of Great Britain

- Act of Parliament
- Parliament of Great Britain
- Long title: An Act to continue several Laws relating to the giving further Encouragement to the Importation of Navel Stores from the British Colonies in America; to the Encouragement of the Silk Manufactures; and for taking off several Duties on Merchandize exported, and reducing other Duties; to the preventing the clandestine Running of Goods, and the Danger of Infection thereby; to the encouraging the Growth of Coffee in His Majesty's Plantations in America; to the Free Importation of Cochineal and Indigo; to the granting a Bounty on certain Species of British and Irish Linens exported, and taking off the Duties on the Importation of Foreign Raw Linen Yarns, made of Flax; to the importing Salt from Europe into the Province of Quebec in America; to the encouraging the Manufacture of Leather, by lowering the Duty payable upon the Importation of Oak Bark, when the Price of such Bark shall exceed a certain Rate; to the more effectual Encouragement of the Manufactures of Flax and Cotton in Great Britain; to the allowing the Importation of Rape Seed, and other Seeds used for extracting Oil, whenever the Prices of Middling British Rape Seed shall be above a certain Limit; to the allowing a Drawback of the Duties on Rum shipped as Stores, to be consumed on Board Merchant Ships in their Voyages; to the clandestine Running of uncustomed Goods, and preventing Frauds relating to the Customs; to the further Punishment of Persons going armed or disguised, in Defence of the Laws of Customs or Excise; to the Free Importation of certain Raw Hides and Skins from Ireland, and the British Plantations in America; and to the Duties on Spirits made in Scotland, and imported into England.
- Citation: 36 Geo. 3. c. 40
- Territorial extent: Great Britain

Dates
- Royal assent: 24 March 1796
- Commencement: 24 March 1796 (Note: The Acts of Parliament (Commencement) Act 1793.)
- Repealed: 21 August 1871
Other legislation
Amends	See § Continued enactments
Repealed by	Statute Law Revision Act 1871
Relates to	See Expiring laws continuance acts

Status: Repealed

Text of statute as originally enacted

The Continuance of Laws Act 1796 (36 Geo. 3. c. 40) was an act of the Parliament of Great Britain that continued various older acts.

== Background ==
In the United Kingdom, acts of Parliament remain in force until expressly repealed. Many acts of parliament, however, contained time-limited sunset clauses, requiring legislation to revive enactments that had expired or to continue enactments that would otherwise expire.

== Provisions ==
=== Continued enactments ===
Section 1 of the act continued the Importation Act 1721 (8 Geo. 1. c. 12) "as relates to the Importation of Wood and Timber, and of the Goods commonly called Lumber, therein particularly enumerated, from any of his Majesty's British Plantations or Colonies in America, free from all Customs and Impositions whatsoever", as continued by the Continuance of Laws, etc. Act 1742 (16 Geo. 2. c. 26), the Continuance of Laws Act 1750 (24 Geo. 2. c. 52), the Continuance of Laws, etc. Act 1757 (31 Geo. 2. c. 1), the Continuance of Laws (No. 2) Act 1763 (4 Geo. 3. c. 12), the Continuance of Certain Laws Act 1772 (12 Geo. 3. c. 56), the Continuance of Laws Act 1779 (19 Geo. 3. c. 22) the Continuance of Laws Act 1786 (26 Geo. 3. c. 53) and the Continuance of Laws Act 1793 (33 Geo. 3. c. 40), from the expiration of those enactments until the end of the next session of parliament after 29 September 1802.

Section 2 of the act continued the Silk Subsidies, Various Duties, Import of Furs, etc. Act 1721 (8 Geo. 1. c. 15) "as relates to the encouragement of the Silk Manufactures of this Kingdom", as continued by the Continuance of Laws, etc. Act 1724 (11 Geo. 1. c. 29), the Unlawful Games Act 1728 (2 Geo. 2. c. 28), the Continuance of Laws Act 1734 (8 Geo. 2. c. 18), the Making of Sail Cloth, etc. Act 1741 (15 Geo. 2. c. 35), the Stamps Act 1746 (20 Geo. 2. c. 45) , the Continuance of Laws, etc. Act 1753 (26 Geo. 2. c. 32), the Continuance of Laws Act 1758 (32 Geo. 2. c. 23), the Continuance of Laws Act 1766 (6 Geo. 3. c. 44), the Continuance of Laws, etc. Act 1774 (14 Geo. 3. c. 86), the Continuance of Laws Act 1782 (22 Geo. 3. c. 13) and the Continuance of Laws Act 1789 (29 Geo. 3. c. 55), from the expiration of those enactments until the end of the next session of parliament after 24 June 1802.

Section 3 of the act continued the Customs, etc. Act 1721 (8 Geo. 1. c. 18) "except the Clauses obliging all Ships and Vessels to perform Quarantine", as continued by the Continuance of Laws Act 1746 (20 Geo. 2. c. 47) , corrected by the Insolvent Debtors Relief, etc. Act 1747 (21 Geo. 2. c. 33) and continued by the Continuance of Laws etc., Act 1754 (27 Geo. 2. c. 18), the Continuance of Laws Act 1759 (33 Geo. 2. c. 16), the Continuance of Laws Act 1766 (7 Geo. 3. c. 35), the Continuance of Laws, etc. Act 1774 (14 Geo. 3. c. 86), the Continuance of Laws Act 1781 (21 Geo. 3. c. 29) and the Continuance of Laws Act 1788 (28 Geo. 3. c. 23), from the expiration of those enactments until the end of the next session of parliament after 29 September 1802.

Section 4 of the act continued the Growth of Coffee Act 1731 (5 Geo. 2. c. 24) "except such Part thereof as relates to the Importation and Exportation of Foreign Coffee into and from the British Colonies and Plantations in America", as continued by the Continuance of Laws Act 1737 (11 Geo. 2. c. 18), the Growth of Coffee Act 1745 (19 Geo. 2. c. 23), the Growth of Coffee, etc. Act 1751 (25 Geo. 2. c. 35), the Continuance of Laws Act 1758 (32 Geo. 2. c. 23), the Continuance of Laws Act 1766 (6 Geo. 3. c. 44), the Continuance of Laws, etc. Act 1774 (14 Geo. 3. c. 86), the Continuance of Laws Act 1781 (21 Geo. 3. c. 29) and the Continuance of Laws Act 1788 (28 Geo. 3. c. 23), from the expiration of those enactments until the end of the next session of parliament after 24 June 1802.

Section 5 of the act continued the Importation Act 1733 (7 Geo. 2. c. 18), as continued by the Continuance of Laws Act 1740 (14 Geo. 2. c. 34), the Continuance of Laws Act 1746 (20 Geo. 2. c. 47), the Continuance of Laws etc., Act 1754 (27 Geo. 2. c. 18), the Continuance of Laws Act 1759 (33 Geo. 2. c. 16), the Importation, etc. Act 1766 (7 Geo. 3. c. 36), the Continuance of Laws, etc. Act 1774 (14 Geo. 3. c. 86), the Continuance of Laws Act 1782 (22 Geo. 3. c. 13) and the Continuance of Laws Act 1789 (29 Geo. 3. c. 55), from the expiration of the act until the end of the next session of parliament after 29 September 1802.

Section 6 of the act continued the Exportation Act 1756 (29 Geo. 2. c. 15), as continued by the Exportation (No. 4) Act 1770 (10 Geo. 3. c. 38), the Bounties Act 1779 (19 Geo. 3. c. 27), the Continuance of Laws Act 1787 (27 Geo. 3. c. 36), the Continuance of Laws (No. 2) Act 1788 (28 Geo. 3. c. 24), the Continuance of Laws, etc. Act 1791 (31 Geo. 3. c. 43), the Continuance of Laws Act 1793 (33 Geo. 3. c. 40) and the Continuance of Laws Act 1795 (35 Geo. 3. c. 38), from the expiration of the act until the end of the next session of parliament after 24 June 1796.

Section 7 of the act continued the Importation into Quebec Act 1763 (4 Geo. 3. c. 19), as continued by the Importation into Quebec Act 1766 (6 Geo. 3. c. 42), the Importation and Exportation (No. 6) Act 1772 (13 Geo. 3. c. 69), the Continuance of Laws (No. 2) Act 1780 (20 Geo. 3. c. 19), the Continuance of Laws Act 1786 (26 Geo. 3. c. 53) and the Continuance of Laws, etc. Act 1791 (31 Geo. 3. c. 43), from the expiration of the act until the end of the next session of parliament after 24 June 1802.

Section 8 of the act continued the Customs (No. 1) Act 1772 (12 Geo. 3. c. 50), as continued by the Continuance of Laws Act 1776 (17 Geo. 3. c. 44), the Manufacture of Leather Act 1784 (24 Geo. 3. Sess. 2. c. 19) and the Continuance of Laws Act 1790 (30 Geo. 3. c. 18), until the end of the next session of parliament after 5 years.

Section 9 of the act continued the Flax, etc., Manufacture Act 1783 (23 Geo. 3. c. 77), as continued by the Continuance of Laws Act 1786 (26 Geo. 3. c. 53), the Continuance of Laws Act 1788 (28 Geo. 3. c. 23), the Flax and Cotton Manufactures Act 1789 (29 Geo. 3. c. 54) and the Continuance of Laws Act 1793 (33 Geo. 3. c. 40), from the expiration of the act until the end of the next session of parliament after 24 June 1797.

Section 10 of the act continued the Importation (No. 4) Act 1795 (35 Geo. 3. c. 117), from the expiration of the act until the end of the next session of parliament after 24 June 1797.

Section 11 of the act continued the act the Continuance of Laws Act 1779 (19 Geo. 3. c. 59) "as relates to allowing a Drawback on the Duties of Rum shipped as Stores to be consumed on board Merchant Ships on their Voyages", as continued by the Continuance of Laws Act 1781 (21 Geo. 3. c. 29), the Exportation, etc. Act 1784 (24 Geo. 3. Sess. 2. c. 50), the Continuance of Laws Act 1786 (26 Geo. 3. c. 53) and the Continuance of Laws Act 1788 (28 Geo. 3. c. 23), from the passing of the act until 1 July 1801.

Section 12 of the act continued certain clauses of the Adulteration of Coffee Act 1718 (5 Geo. 1. c. 11), as continued by the Continuance of Laws Act 1722 (9 Geo. 1. c. 8), the Unlawful Games Act 1728 (2 Geo. 2. c. 28), the Continuance of Laws (No. 2) Act 1734 (8 Geo. 2. c. 21), the Starr and Bent Act 1741 (15 Geo. 2. c. 33), the Continuance of Laws Act 1746 (20 Geo. 2. c. 47), the Continuance of Laws etc., Act 1754 (27 Geo. 2. c. 18), the Continuance of Laws Act 1759 (33 Geo. 2. c. 16), the Continuance of Laws Act 1766 (7 Geo. 3. c. 35), the Continuance of Laws, etc. Act 1774 (14 Geo. 3. c. 86), the Continuance of Laws Act 1781 (21 Geo. 3. c. 29) and the Continuance of Laws Act 1788 (28 Geo. 3. c. 23), from the expiration of those enactments to the end of the next session of parliament after 29 September 1802.

Section 13 of the act continued the Offences against Customs or Excise Act 1745 (19 Geo. 2. c. 34) "as relates to the further punishment of persons going armed or disguised in defiance of the laws of customs or excise, and to the relief of officers of the customs in informations upon seizures", as continued by the Continuance of Laws, etc. Act 1753 (26 Geo. 2. c. 32), the Persons Going Armed or Disguised Act 1758 (32 Geo. 2. c. 23), the Continuance of Laws (No. 2) Act 1763 (4 Geo. 3. c. 12), the Continuance of Certain Laws, etc. Act 1771 (11 Geo. 3. c. 51), the Continuance of Laws Act 1778 (18 Geo. 3. c. 45), the Continuance of Laws (No. 2) Act 1786 (26 Geo. 3. c. 80) and the Continuance of Laws Act 1788 (28 Geo. 3. c. 23), from the expiration of those enactments until the end of the next session of parliament after 29 September 1802.

Section 14 of the act continued the until the Hides and Skins Act 1769 (9 Geo. 3. c. 39) "as relates to the free importation of certain raw hides and skins from Ireland, and the British plantations in America", as continued by the Continuance of Laws, etc. Act 1774 (14 Geo. 3. c. 86), the Continuance of Laws Act 1781 (21 Geo. 3. c. 29), the Continuance of Laws Act 1787 (27 Geo. 3. c. 36) and the Continuance of Laws Act 1792 (32 Geo. 3. c. 36), from the expiration of those enactments until the end of the next session of parliament after 1 June 1803.

Section 15 of the act. continued the Distilleries, etc. (Scotland) Act 1793 (33 Geo. 3. c. 61) "as imposes Duties on Spirits made or manufactured in that Part of Great Britain called Scotland" from the expiration of those enactments until the end of the next session of parliament after 1 June 1802.

== Subsequent developments ==
The Select Committee on Temporary Laws, Expired or Expiring, appointed in 1796, inspected and considered all temporary laws, observing irregularities in the construction of expiring laws continuance acts, making recommendations and emphasising the importance of the Committee for Expired and Expiring Laws.

The whole act was repealed by section 1 of, and the schedule to, the Statute Law Revision Act 1871 (34 & 35 Vict. c. 116), which came into force on 21 August 1871.
