= Continuance of Laws Act 1789 =

Act of the Parliament of Great Britain

- Act of Parliament
- Parliament of Great Britain
- Long title: An Act to continue several Laws therein mentioned, relative to the better Encouragement of the making of Sail Cloth in Great Britain; to the Encouragement of the Silk Manufactures, and for taking off several Duties on Merchandize exported, and reducing other Duties; to the free Importation of Cochineal and Indigo; to the prohibiting the Importation of Books reprinted abroad, and first composed, written, and printed in Great Britain; to securing the Duties upon Foreign made Sail Cloth, and charging Foreign made Sails with a Duty; to the prohibiting the Importation of Foreign Wrought Silks and Velvets; to the discontinuing the Duties payable upon the Importation of Tallow, Hogs Lard, and Grease; to the prohibiting the Exportation of Tools and Utensils made use of in the Iron and Steel Manufactures of this Kingdom, and to prevent the seducing of Artificers and Workmen employed in those Manufactures to go into Parts beyond the Seas; and to the ascertaining the Strength of Spirits by Clarke's Hydrometer.
- Citation: 29 Geo. 3. c. 55
- Territorial extent: Great Britain

Dates
- Royal assent: 31 July 1789
- Commencement: 20 November 1788 (Note: Start of session.)
- Repealed: 21 August 1871

Other legislation
- Amends: See § Continued enactments
- Repealed by: Statute Law Revision Act 1871
- Relates to: See Expiring laws continuance acts

Status: Repealed

Text of statute as originally enacted

The Continuance of Laws Act 1789 (29 Geo. 3. c. 55) was an act of the Parliament of Great Britain that continued various older acts.

== Background ==
In the United Kingdom, acts of Parliament remain in force until expressly repealed. Many acts of parliament, however, contained time-limited sunset clauses, requiring legislation to revive enactments that had expired or to continue enactments that would otherwise expire.

== Provisions ==
=== Continued enactments ===
Section 1 of the act continued the Sail Cloth Act 1759 (33 Geo. 2. c. 17), as continued by the Customs Act 1768 (8 Geo. 3. c. 23), the Continuance of Laws (No. 2) Act 1774 (14 Geo. 3. c. 80) and the Continuance of Laws Act 1782 (22 Geo. 3. c. 13), from the expiration of the act until the end of the next session of parliament after 29 September 1795.

Section 2 of the act amended the Sail Cloth Manufacture Act 1712 (12 Ann. c. 12) (Note: This is the citation in The Statutes of the Realm.), providing that from 29 September 1789, the reward given under that act would not be paid for sails exported, unless stamped before shipping and that sails stamped after exporting would be forfeited.

Section 3 of the act continued the Silk Subsidies, Various Duties, Import of Furs, etc. Act 1721 (8 Geo. 1. c. 15) "as relates to the encouragement of the Silk Manufactures of this Kingdom", as continued by the Continuance of Laws, etc. Act 1724 (11 Geo. 1. c. 29), the Unlawful Games Act 1728 (2 Geo. 2. c. 28), the Continuance of Laws Act 1734 (8 Geo. 2. c. 18), the Making of Sail Cloth, etc. Act 1741 (15 Geo. 2. c. 35), the Stamps Act 1746 (20 Geo. 2. c. 45) , the Continuance of Laws, etc. Act 1753 (26 Geo. 2. c. 32), the Continuance of Laws Act 1758 (32 Geo. 2. c. 23), the Continuance of Laws Act 1766 (6 Geo. 3. c. 44), the Continuance of Laws, etc. Act 1774 (14 Geo. 3. c. 86) and the Continuance of Laws Act 1782 (22 Geo. 3. c. 13), from the expiration of those enactments until the end of the next session of parliament after 24 June 1795.

Section 4 of the act continued the Importation Act 1733 (7 Geo. 2. c. 18), as continued by the Continuance of Laws Act 1740 (14 Geo. 2. c. 34), the Continuance of Laws Act 1746 (20 Geo. 2. c. 47), the Continuance of Laws etc., Act 1754 (27 Geo. 2. c. 18), the Continuance of Laws Act 1759 (33 Geo. 2. c. 16), the Importation, etc. Act 1766 (7 Geo. 3. c. 36), the Continuance of Laws, etc. Act 1774 (14 Geo. 3. c. 86) and the Continuance of Laws Act 1782 (22 Geo. 3. c. 13), from the expiration of the act until the end of the next session of parliament after 29 September 1795.

Section 5 of the act continued the Importation Act 1738 (12 Geo. 2. c. 36) "as relates to the prohibiting the importation of books reprinted abroad, and first composed or written and printed in Great Britain", as continued by the Continuance of Laws Act 1746 (20 Geo. 2. c. 47), the Continuance of Laws etc., Act 1754 (27 Geo. 2. c. 18), the Continuance of Laws Act 1759 (33 Geo. 2. c. 16), the Continuance of Laws (No. 2) Act 1766 (7 Geo. 3. c. 35), the Continuance of Laws, etc. Act 1774 (14 Geo. 3. c. 86) and the Continuance of Laws Act 1782 (22 Geo. 3. c. 13), from the expiration of those enactments until the end of the next session of parliament after 29 September 1795.

Section 6 of the act continued the Sail Cloth Act 1745 (19 Geo. 2. c. 27), as continued by the Continuance of Laws, etc. Act 1753 (26 Geo. 2. c. 32), the Continuance of Laws Act 1758 (32 Geo. 2. c. 23), the Continuance of Laws Act 1766 (6 Geo. 3. c. 44), the Continuance of Laws (No. 2) Act 1774 (14 Geo. 3. c. 80) and the Continuance of Laws Act 1782 (22 Geo. 3. c. 13), from the expiration of the act until the end of the next session of parliament after 24 June 1795.

Section 7 of the act continued the Importation, etc. Act 1766 (6 Geo. 3. c. 28) "as relates to the prohibiting the Importation of foreign-wrought Silks and Velvets", as continued by the Importation (No. 3) Act 1771 (11 Geo. 3. c. 49), the Importation (No. 3) Act 1776 (17 Geo. 3. c. 35) and the Importation Act (No. 4) 1782 (22 Geo. 3. c. 72), from the expiration of those enactments until the end of the next session of parliament after 14 June 1795.

Section 8 of the act continued the continued the Importation (No. 6) Act 1766 (7 Geo. 3. c. 12), as continued by the Discontinuance of Duties Act 1770 (10 Geo. 3. c. 8), the Importation and Exportation (No. 5) Act 1772 (13 Geo. 3. c. 5) the Customs Act 1776 (16 Geo. 3. c. 12), the Customs Act 1782 (22 Geo. 3. c. 20) and the Continuance of Laws Act 1786 (26 Geo. 3. c. 53), from the expiration of the act until the end of the next session of parliament after 25 March 1791.

Section 9 of the act continued the Exportation (No. 4) Act 1786 (26 Geo. 3. c. 89), as continued by the Continuance of Laws Act 1787 (27 Geo. 3. c. 36) and the Continuance of Laws Act 1788 (28 Geo. 3. c. 23), from the expiration of the act until the end of the next session of parliament.

Section 10 of the act continued the Exports Act 1787 (27 Geo. 3. c. 31) "as directs that all Spirits shall be deemed and taken to be of the Degree of Strength as Which the Hydrometer, commonly called Clarke's Hydrometer, shall, upon Trial of any Officer or Officers of Excise, denote any such Spirits to be", as continued by the Continuance of Laws Act 1788 (28 Geo. 3. c. 23), from the passing of the act until the end of the next session of parliament.

== Subsequent developments ==
The Select Committee on Temporary Laws, Expired or Expiring, appointed in 1796, inspected and considered all temporary laws, observing irregularities in the construction of expiring laws continuance acts, making recommendations and emphasising the importance of the Committee for Expired and Expiring Laws.

The whole act was repealed by section 1 of, and the schedule to, the Statute Law Revision Act 1871 (34 & 35 Vict. c. 116), which came into force on 21 August 1871.
