= Continuance of Laws Act 1774 =

Act of the Parliament of Great Britain

- Act of Parliament
- Parliament of Great Britain
- Long title: An Act to continue the several Laws therein mentioned for granting Liberty to carry Rice from His Majesty's Provinces of Carolina and Georgia, in America, directly to any Part of Europe Southward of Cape Finisterre; for granting the like Liberty to export Rice from South Carolina and Georgia, directly to any Part of America to the Southward of the said Provinces; for granting the like Liberty in the Exportation of Rice from East and West Florida, and from any Part of America Southward of South Carolina and Georgia.
- Citation: 14 Geo. 3. c. 67
- Territorial extent: Great Britain

Dates
- Royal assent: 3 June 1772
- Commencement: 21 January 1772 (Note: Start of session.)
- Repealed: 21 August 1871
Other legislation
Amends	See § Continued enactments
Repealed by	Statute Law Revision Act 1871
Relates to	See Expiring laws continuance acts

Status: Repealed

Text of statute as originally enacted

The Continuance of Laws Act 1774 (14 Geo. 3. c. 67) was an act of the Parliament of Great Britain that continued various older acts.

== Background ==
In the United Kingdom, acts of Parliament remain in force until expressly repealed. Many acts of parliament, however, contained time-limited sunset clauses, requiring legislation to revive enactments that had expired or to continue enactments that would otherwise expire.

== Provisions ==
=== Continued enactments ===
Section 1 of the act continued the Colonial Trade Act 1729 (3 Geo. 2. c. 28), as continued by the Colonial Trade Act 1734 (8 Geo. 2. c. 19), the Starr and Bent Act 1741 (15 Geo. 2. c. 33) , the Continuance of Laws Act 1746 (20 Geo. 2. c. 47), the Continuance of Laws etc., Act 1754 (27 Geo. 2. c. 18), the Continuance of Laws Act 1759 (33 Geo. 2. c. 16) and the Continuance of Laws Act 1766 (7 Geo. 3. c. 35), from the expiration of the act to the end of the next session of parliament after 29 September 1781.

Section 2 of the act continued the Colonial Trade Act 1763 (4 Geo. 3. c. 27) and a clause in the Customs, etc. Act 1765 (5 Geo. 3. c. 29) "which gave liberty to export rice from North Carolina, in the same manner, and under the like duties, securities, restrictions, regulations, limitations, duties, penalties, and forfeitures, as the 1763 act with respect to carrying rice to South Carolina and Georgia from the expiration of those enactments to the end of the next session of parliament after 24 June 1781.

Section 3 of the act continued the Exportation (No. 3) Act 1770 (10 Geo. 3. c. 31), as amended by the Exportation (No. 2) Act 1771 (11 Geo. 3. c. 39), from the expiration of the act to the end of the next session of parliament after 29 September 1781.

== Subsequent developments ==
The Select Committee on Temporary Laws, Expired or Expiring, appointed in 1796, inspected and considered all temporary laws, observing irregularities in the construction of expiring laws continuance acts, making recommendations and emphasising the importance of the Committee for Expired and Expiring Laws.

The whole act was repealed by section 1 of, and the schedule to, the Statute Law Revision Act 1871 (34 & 35 Vict. c. 116), which came into force on 21 August 1871.
