= Continuance of Laws Act 1788 =

Act of the Parliament of Great Britain

- Act of Parliament
- Parliament of Great Britain
- Long title: An Act to continue several Laws relating to the clandestine Running of uncustomed Goods, and preventing Frauds relating to the Customs; to the encouraging the Growth of Coffee in His Majesty's Plantations in America; to the further Punishment of Persons going armed or disguised in Defiance of the Laws of Customs or Excise; to the more effectually encouraging the Manufactures of Flax and Cotton in Great Britain; to the allowing the Exportation of certain Quantities of Wheat and other Articles to His Majesty's Sugar Colonies in America; to the permitting the Exportation of Tobacco Pipe Clay from this Kingdom, to the British Sugar Colonies or Plantations in the West Indies; to the prohibiting the Exportation of Tools and Utensils made use of in the Iron and Steel Manufactures of this Kingdom, and to prevent the seducing of Artificers and Workmen employed in those Manufactures, to go into Parts beyond the Seas; and to the preventing the clandestine Running of Goods, and the Danger of Infection thereby; and to revive and continue several Laws relating to the allowing a Drawback of the Duties on Rum shipped as Stores to be consumed on board Merchant Ships on their Voyages; and to the ascertaining the Strength of Spirits by Clarke's Hydrometer.
- Citation: 28 Geo. 3. c. 23
- Territorial extent: Great Britain

Dates
- Royal assent: 11 June 1788
- Commencement: 27 November 1787 (Note: Start of session.)
- Repealed: 21 August 1871

Other legislation
- Amends: See § Revived and continued enactments
- Repealed by: Statute Law Revision Act 1871
- Relates to: See Expiring laws continuance acts

Status: Repealed

Text of statute as originally enacted

The Continuance of Laws Act 1788 (28 Geo. 3. c. 23) was an act of the Parliament of Great Britain that continued various older acts.

== Background ==
In the United Kingdom, acts of Parliament remain in force until expressly repealed. Many acts of parliament, however, contained time-limited sunset clauses, requiring legislation to revive enactments that had expired or to continue enactments that would otherwise expire.

== Provisions ==
=== Revived and continued enactments ===
Section 1 of the act continued certain clauses of the Adulteration of Coffee Act 1718 (5 Geo. 1. c. 11), as continued by the Continuance of Laws Act 1722 (9 Geo. 1. c. 8), the Unlawful Games Act 1728 (2 Geo. 2. c. 28), the Continuance of Laws (No. 2) Act 1734 (8 Geo. 2. c. 21), the Starr and Bent Act 1741 (15 Geo. 2. c. 33), the Continuance of Laws Act 1746 (20 Geo. 2. c. 47), the Continuance of Laws etc., Act 1754 (27 Geo. 2. c. 18), the Continuance of Laws Act 1759 (33 Geo. 2. c. 16), the Continuance of Laws Act 1766 (7 Geo. 3. c. 35), the Continuance of Laws, etc. Act 1774 (14 Geo. 3. c. 86) and the Continuance of Laws Act 1781 (21 Geo. 3. c. 29), from the expiration of those enactments to the end of the next session of parliament after 29 September 1795.

Section 2 of the act continued the Growth of Coffee Act 1731 (5 Geo. 2. c. 24) "except such part thereof as relates to the importation and exportation of foreign coffee into, and out from, the British colonies and plantations in America", as continued by the Continuance of Laws Act 1737 (11 Geo. 2. c. 18), the Growth of Coffee Act 1745 (19 Geo. 2. c. 23), the Growth of Coffee, etc. Act 1751 (25 Geo. 2. c. 35), the Continuance of Laws Act 1758 (32 Geo. 2. c. 23), the Continuance of Laws Act 1766 (6 Geo. 3. c. 44), the Continuance of Laws, etc. Act 1774 (14 Geo. 3. c. 86), the Continuance of Laws Act 1781 (21 Geo. 3. c. 29) and the Continuance of Laws (No. 2) Act 1786 (26 Geo. 3. c. 80), from the expiration of those enactments until the end of the next session of parliament after 24 June 1795.

Section 3 of the act continued the Offences against Customs or Excise Act 1745 (19 Geo. 2. c. 34) "as relates to the further punishment of persons going armed or disguised in defiance of the laws of customs or excise, and to the relief of officers of the customs in informations upon seizures", as continued by the Continuance of Laws, etc. Act 1753 (26 Geo. 2. c. 32), the Persons Going Armed or Disguised Act 1758 (32 Geo. 2. c. 23), the Continuance of Laws (No. 2) Act 1763 (4 Geo. 3. c. 12), the Continuance of Certain Laws, etc. Act 1771 (11 Geo. 3. c. 51) and the Continuance of Laws Act 1778 (18 Geo. 3. c. 45), from the expiration of those enactments until the end of the next session of parliament after 29 September 1795.

Section 4 of the act continued the Flax, etc., Manufacture Act 1783 (23 Geo. 3. c. 77), as continued by the Continuance of Laws Act 1786 (26 Geo. 3. c. 53), until the end of the next session of parliament 2 years after the expiration of the act.

Section 5 of the act continued the Exportation Act 1776 (16 Geo. 3. c. 37) "as relates to allowing the exportation of certain quantities of wheat, and other articles to his Majesty's sugar colonies in America", as continued by the Exportation (No. 2) Act 1776 (17 Geo. 3. c. 28), the Exportation Act 1778 (18 Geo. 3. c. 16), the Continuance of Laws Act 1779 (19 Geo. 3. c. 22), the Continuance of Laws (No. 2) Act 1780 (20 Geo. 3. c. 19), the Continuance of Laws Act 1781 (21 Geo. 3. c. 29) and the Continuance of Laws Act 1787 (27 Geo. 3. c. 36), from the passing of the act until 1 May 1789.

Section 6 of the act continued the Customs (No. 6) Act 1776 (17 Geo. 3. c. 43) "as permits the exportation of tobacco-pipe clay from this kingdom to the British sugar colonies or plantations in the West Indies", as continued by the Continuance of Laws (No. 2) Act 1780 (20 Geo. 3. c. 19) and the Continuance of Laws Act 1783 (23 Geo. 3. c. 6), from the expiration of those enactments until the next session of parliament after 24 June 1792.

Section 7 of the act continued the Exportation (No. 4) Act 1786 (26 Geo. 3. c. 89), as continued by the Continuance of Laws Act 1787 (27 Geo. 3. c. 36), from the expiration of the act until the end of the next session of parliament.

Section 8 of the act continued the Customs, etc. Act 1721 (8 Geo. 1. c. 18) "except the Clauses obliging all Ships and Vessels to perform Quarantine", as continued by the Continuance of Laws Act 1746 (20 Geo. 2. c. 47) , corrected by the Insolvent Debtors Relief, etc. Act 1747 (21 Geo. 2. c. 33) and continued by the Continuance of Laws etc., Act 1754 (27 Geo. 2. c. 18), the Continuance of Laws Act 1759 (33 Geo. 2. c. 16), the Continuance of Laws Act 1766 (7 Geo. 3. c. 35), the Continuance of Laws, etc. Act 1774 (14 Geo. 3. c. 86) and the Continuance of Laws Act 1781 (21 Geo. 3. c. 29), from the expiration of those enactments until the end of the next session of parliament after 29 September 1795.

Section 9 of the act revived and continued the act the Continuance of Laws Act 1779 (19 Geo. 3. c. 59) "as relates to allowing a Drawback on the Duties of Rum shipped as Stores to be consumed on board Merchant Ships on their Voyages", as continued by the Continuance of Laws Act 1781 (21 Geo. 3. c. 29), the Exportation, etc. Act 1784 (24 Geo. 3. Sess. 2. c. 50) and the Continuance of Laws Act 1786 (26 Geo. 3. c. 53), from the passing of the act until 1 July 1795.

Section 10 of the act revived and continued the Exports Act 1787 (27 Geo. 3. c. 31) "as directs that all Spirits shall be deemed and taken to be of the Degree of Strength as Which the Hydrometer, commonly called Clarke's Hydrometer, shall, upon Trial of any Officer or Officers of Excise, denote any such Spirits to be" from the passing of the act until the end of the next session of parliament.

== Subsequent developments ==
The Select Committee on Temporary Laws, Expired or Expiring, appointed in 1796, inspected and considered all temporary laws, observing irregularities in the construction of expiring laws continuance acts, making recommendations and emphasising the importance of the Committee for Expired and Expiring Laws.

The whole act was repealed by section 1 of, and the schedule to, the Statute Law Revision Act 1871 (34 & 35 Vict. c. 116), which came into force on 21 August 1871.
