= Continuance of Laws Act 1782 =

Act of the Parliament of Great Britain

- Act of Parliament
- Parliament of Great Britain
- Long title: An Act to continue several Laws therein mentioned, relating to the better Encouragement of the making of Sail Cloth in Great Britain; to the Encouragement of the Silk Manufactures; and for taking off several Duties on Merchandize exported, and reducing other Duties; to the free Importation of Cochineal and Indigo; to the prohibiting the Importation of Books re-printed Abroad, and first composed, written and printed in Great Britain; to securing the Duties upon Foreign made Sail Cloth, and charging Foreign made Sails with a Duty; to the allowing a Bounty on the Exportation of British Corn and Grain in Neutral Ships; to the allowing the Exportation of Provisions, Goods, Wares and Merchandizes to certain Places in North America, which are or may be under the Protection of His Majesty's Arms, and from such Places to Great Britain and other Parts of His Majesty's Dominions; to the empowering His Majesty to prohibit the Exportation and restrain the carrying Coastwise of Copper in Bars or Copper in Sheets; and to the allowing the Exportation of certain Quantities of Wheat and other Articles to His Majesty's Sugar Colonies in America.
- Citation: 22 Geo. 3. c. 13
- Territorial extent: Great Britain

Dates
- Royal assent: 25 March 1782
- Commencement: 27 November 1781 (Note: Start of session.)
- Repealed: 21 August 1871

Other legislation
- Amends: See § Continued enactments
- Repealed by: Statute Law Revision Act 1871
- Relates to: See Expiring laws continuance acts

Status: Repealed

Text of statute as originally enacted

The Continuance of Laws Act 1782 (22 Geo. 3. c. 13) was an act of the Parliament of Great Britain that continued various older acts.

== Background ==
In the United Kingdom, acts of Parliament remain in force until expressly repealed. Many acts of parliament, however, contained time-limited sunset clauses, requiring legislation to revive enactments that had expired or to continue enactments that would otherwise expire.

== Provisions ==
=== Continued enactments ===
Section 1 of the act continued the Sail Cloth Act 1759 (33 Geo. 2. c. 17), as continued by the Customs Act 1768 (8 Geo. 3. c. 23) and the Continuance of Laws (No. 2) Act 1774 (14 Geo. 3. c. 80), from the expiration of the act until the end of the next session of parliament after 29 September 1788.

Section 2 of the act continued the Silk Subsidies, Various Duties, Import of Furs, etc. Act 1721 (8 Geo. 1. c. 15) "as relates to the encouragement of the Silk Manufactures of this Kingdom", as continued by the Continuance of Laws, etc. Act 1724 (11 Geo. 1. c. 29), the Unlawful Games Act 1728 (2 Geo. 2. c. 28), the Continuance of Laws Act 1734 (8 Geo. 2. c. 18), the Making of Sail Cloth, etc. Act 1741 (15 Geo. 2. c. 35), the Stamps Act 1746 (20 Geo. 2. c. 45) , the Continuance of Laws, etc. Act 1753 (26 Geo. 2. c. 32), the Continuance of Laws Act 1758 (32 Geo. 2. c. 23), the Continuance of Laws Act 1766 (6 Geo. 3. c. 44) and the Continuance of Laws, etc. Act 1774 (14 Geo. 3. c. 86), from the expiration of those enactments until the end of the next session of parliament after 24 June 1788.

Section 3 of the act continued the Importation Act 1733 (7 Geo. 2. c. 18), as continued by the Continuance of Laws Act 1740 (14 Geo. 2. c. 34), the Continuance of Laws Act 1746 (20 Geo. 2. c. 47), the Continuance of Laws etc., Act 1754 (27 Geo. 2. c. 18), the Continuance of Laws Act 1759 (33 Geo. 2. c. 16), the Importation, etc. Act 1766 (7 Geo. 3. c. 36) and the Continuance of Laws, etc. Act 1774 (14 Geo. 3. c. 86), from the expiration of the act until the end of the next session of parliament after 29 September 1788.

Section 4 of the act continued the Importation Act 1738 (12 Geo. 2. c. 36) as relates to the importation of books reprinted abroad, and first composed or written and printed in Great Britain, as continued by the Continuance of Laws Act 1746 (20 Geo. 2. c. 47), the Continuance of Laws etc., Act 1754 (27 Geo. 2. c. 18), the Continuance of Laws Act 1759 (33 Geo. 2. c. 16), the Continuance of Laws Act 1766 (7 Geo. 3. c. 35) and the Continuance of Laws, etc. Act 1774 (14 Geo. 3. c. 86), from the expiration of the act until the end of the next session of parliament after 29 September 1788.

Section 5 of the act continued the Sail Cloth Act 1745 (19 Geo. 2. c. 27), as continued by the Continuance of Laws, etc. Act 1753 (26 Geo. 2. c. 32), the Continuance of Laws Act 1758 (32 Geo. 2. c. 23), the Continuance of Laws Act 1766 (6 Geo. 3. c. 44) and the Continuance of Laws (No. 2) Act 1774 (14 Geo. 3. c. 80), from the expiration of the act until the end of the next session of parliament after 24 June 1788.

Section 6 of the act continued the Bounty on Corn Act 1780 (20 Geo. 3. c. 31), as revived and continued by the Continuance of Laws Act 1781 (21 Geo. 3. c. 29), from the passing of the act until 25 March 1783.

Section 7 of the act continued the Exportation Act 1780 (20 Geo. 3. c. 46), as continued by the Continuance of Laws Act 1781 (21 Geo. 3. c. 29), from the expiration of the act until the end of the next session of parliament after 1 June 1783.

Section 8 of the act continued the Exportations, etc. Act 1780 (20 Geo. 3. c. 59), as continued by the Continuance of Laws Act 1781 (21 Geo. 3. c. 29), until 1 May 1783.

Section 9 of the act continued the Exportation Act 1776 (16 Geo. 3. c. 37) "as relates to allowing the exportation of certain quantities of wheat, and other articles to his Majesty's sugar colonies in America", as continued by the Exportation (No. 2) Act 1776 (17 Geo. 3. c. 28), the Exportation Act 1778 (18 Geo. 3. c. 16), the Continuance of Laws Act 1779 (19 Geo. 3. c. 22), the Continuance of Laws (No. 2) Act 1780 (20 Geo. 3. c. 19) and the Continuance of Laws Act 1781 (21 Geo. 3. c. 29), until 1 May 1783.

== Subsequent developments ==
The Select Committee on Temporary Laws, Expired or Expiring, appointed in 1796, inspected and considered all temporary laws, observing irregularities in the construction of expiring laws continuance acts, making recommendations and emphasising the importance of the Committee for Expired and Expiring Laws.

The whole act was repealed by section 1 of, and the schedule to, the Statute Law Revision Act 1871 (34 & 35 Vict. c. 116), which came into force on 21 August 1871.
