= Continuance of Laws, etc. Act 1774 =

Act of the Parliament of Great Britain

- Act of Parliament
- Parliament of Great Britain
- Long title: An Act to continue several Laws therein mentioned, relating to the allowing a Drawback of the Duties upon the Exportation of Copper Bars imported; to the clandestine Running of uncustomed Goods, and preventing Frauds relating to the Customs; to the Encouragement of the Silk Manufactures, and for taking off several Duties on Merchandize exported, and reducing other Duties; to prevent the clandestine Running of Goods, and the Danger of Infection thereby; to the Premiums upon Masts, Yards, and Bowsprits, Tar, Pitch, and Turpentine; to the encouraging the Growth of Coffee in His Majesty’s Plantations in America; to the free Importation of Cochineal and Indict; to the prohibiting the Importation of Books reprinted abroad, and First composed, written, and printed in Great Britain; to the Bounty on the Exportation of British made Cordage; to the free Importation of certain Raw Hides and Skins from Ireland, and the British Plantations in America; to the regulating the Fees of Officers of the Customs and Naval Officers in America; to the preventing the spreading of the contagious Disorder among the Horned Cattle in Great Britain; and to extend the Provisions of an Act of the Twelfth Year of the Reign of King George the First, for the Improvement of His Majesty's Revenues of Customs, Excise, and Inland Duties; so far as relates to the commencing Prosecutions for Penalties against the Revenue of Customs, to subsequent Acts.
- Citation: 14 Geo. 3. c. 86
- Territorial extent: Great Britain

Dates
- Royal assent: 22 June 1774
- Commencement: 13 January 1774 (Note: Start of session.)
- Repealed: 21 August 1871
Other legislation
Amends	See § Continued enactments
Repealed by	Statute Law Revision Act 1871
Relates to	See Expiring laws continuance acts

Status: Repealed

Text of statute as originally enacted

The Continuance of Laws, etc. Act 1774 (14 Geo. 3. c. 86) was an act of the Parliament of Great Britain that continued various older acts.

== Background ==
In the United Kingdom, acts of Parliament remain in force until expressly repealed. Many acts of parliament, however, contained time-limited sunset clauses, requiring legislation to revive enactments that had expired or to continue enactments that would otherwise expire.

== Provisions ==
=== Continued enactments ===
Section 1 of the act continued section 19 of the Trade with Africa Act 1697 (9 Will. 3. c. 26) "for allowing during a limited time a drawback of the duties upon the exportation of copper bars imported", as revived and continued by the Poor Act 1712 (12 Ann. c. 18), and the provision in section 5 of the 1712 act that provided that drawback on copper would be allowed on imports from the East Indies and the coast of Barbary, as continued by the Continuance of Laws, etc. Act 1726 (13 Geo. 1. c. 27), the Making of Sail Cloth, etc. Act 1741 (15 Geo. 2. c. 35), the Continuance of Laws, etc. Act 1753 (26 Geo. 2. c. 32), the Continuance of Laws Act 1758 (32 Geo. 2. c. 23) and the Continuance of Laws Act 1766 (6 Geo. 3. c. 44), from the expiration of those enactments until the end of the next session of parliament after 24 June 1781.

Section 2 of the act continued certain clauses of the Adulteration of Coffee Act 1718 (5 Geo. 1. c. 11), as continued by the Continuance of Laws Act 1722 (9 Geo. 1. c. 8), the Unlawful Games Act 1728 (2 Geo. 2. c. 28), the Continuance of Laws (No. 2) Act 1734 (8 Geo. 2. c. 21), the Starr and Bent Act 1741 (15 Geo. 2. c. 33), the Continuance of Laws Act 1746 (20 Geo. 2. c. 47), the Continuance of Laws etc., Act 1754 (27 Geo. 2. c. 18), the Continuance of Laws Act 1759 (33 Geo. 2. c. 16) and the Continuance of Laws Act 1766 (7 Geo. 3. c. 35), from the expiration of those enactments to the end of the next session of parliament after 29 September 1781.

Section 3 of the act continued the Silk Subsidies, Various Duties, Import of Furs, etc. Act 1721 (8 Geo. 1. c. 15) "as relates to the encouragement of the Silk Manufactures of this Kingdom", as continued by the Continuance of Laws, etc. Act 1724 (11 Geo. 1. c. 29), the Unlawful Games Act 1728 (2 Geo. 2. c. 28), the Continuance of Laws Act 1734 (8 Geo. 2. c. 18), the Making of Sail Cloth, etc. Act 1741 (15 Geo. 2. c. 35), the Stamps Act 1746 (20 Geo. 2. c. 45) , the Continuance of Laws, etc. Act 1753 (26 Geo. 2. c. 32), the Continuance of Laws Act 1758 (32 Geo. 2. c. 23) and the Continuance of Laws Act 1766 (6 Geo. 3. c. 44), from the expiration of those enactments until the end of the next session of parliament after 24 June 1781.

Section 4 of the act continued the Customs, etc. Act 1721 (8 Geo. 1. c. 18) "except the Clauses obliging all Ships and Vessels to perform Quarantine", as continued by the Continuance of Laws Act 1746 (20 Geo. 2. c. 47), corrected by the Insolvent Debtors Relief, etc. Act 1747 (21 Geo. 2. c. 33) and continued by the Continuance of Laws etc., Act 1754 (27 Geo. 2. c. 18), the Continuance of Laws Act 1759 (33 Geo. 2. c. 16) and the Continuance of Laws Act 1766 (7 Geo. 3. c. 35), from the expiration of those enactments until the end of the next session of parliament after 29 September 1781.

Section 5 of the act extended the Customs, etc. Act 1721 (8 Geo. 1. c. 18), providing that from the passing of the act, a Capias requiring bail and security may issue against any person prosecuted for offences committed against acts preventing clandestine importing, running, or exporting of customable or prohibited goods, or for knowingly receiving such goods.

Section 6 of the act continued the Preservation of Woods, America Act 1728 (2 Geo. 2. c. 35) "as relates to the premiums upon malts, yards, and bowsprits, tar, pitch, and turpentine", as continued by the Continuance of Laws, etc. Act 1739 (13 Geo. 2. c. 28), the Continuance of Laws Act 1750 (24 Geo. 2. c. 52), the Growth of Coffee, etc. Act 1751 (25 Geo. 2. c. 35), the Continuance of Laws Act 1758 (32 Geo. 2. c. 23) and the Continuance of Laws Act 1766 (6 Geo. 3. c. 44), from the expiration of the act until the end of the next session of parliament after 24 June 1781.

Section 7 of the act continued the Growth of Coffee Act 1731 (5 Geo. 2. c. 24) "except such part thereof as relates to the importation and exportation of foreign coffee into from, the British colonies and plantations in America", as continued by the Continuance of Laws Act 1737 (11 Geo. 2. c. 18), the Growth of Coffee Act 1745 (19 Geo. 2. c. 23), the Growth of Coffee, etc. Act 1751 (25 Geo. 2. c. 35), the Continuance of Laws Act 1758 (32 Geo. 2. c. 23) and the Continuance of Laws Act 1766 (6 Geo. 3. c. 44), from the expiration of those enactments until the end of the next session of parliament after 24 June 1781.

Section 8 of the act continued the Importation Act 1733 (7 Geo. 2. c. 18), as continued by the Continuance of Laws Act 1740 (14 Geo. 2. c. 34), the Continuance of Laws Act 1746 (20 Geo. 2. c. 47), the Continuance of Laws etc., Act 1754 (27 Geo. 2. c. 18), the Continuance of Laws Act 1759 (33 Geo. 2. c. 16) and the Importation, etc. Act 1766 (7 Geo. 3. c. 36), from the expiration of the act until the end of the next session of parliament after 29 September 1781.

Section 9 of the act continued the Importation Act 1738 (12 Geo. 2. c. 36) "as relates to the prohibiting the importation of books reprinted abroad, and first composed or written and printed in Great Britain", as continued by the Continuance of Laws Act 1746 (20 Geo. 2. c. 47), the Continuance of Laws etc., Act 1754 (27 Geo. 2. c. 18), the Continuance of Laws Act 1759 (33 Geo. 2. c. 16) and the Continuance of Laws Act 1766 (7 Geo. 3. c. 35), from the expiration of those enactments until the end of the next session of parliament after 29 September 1781.

Section 10 of the act continued the Bounty of Exportation Act 1766 (6 Geo. 3. c. 45), as amended and continued by the Customs (No. 2) Act 1772 (12 Geo. 3. c. 60), until the end of the next session of parliament after 3 years from the expiration of the act.

Section 11 of the act continued the until the Hides and Skins Act 1769 (9 Geo. 3. c. 39) "as relates to the free importation of certain raw hides and skins from Ireland, and the British plantations in America" until the end of the next session of parliament after 5 years from the expiration of those enactments.

Section 12 of the act continued so much of the Customs, etc. Act 1765 (5 Geo. 3. c. 45) and the Making of Indigo, etc. Act 1770 (10 Geo. 3. c. 37) "as relates to the regulating the Fees of the Officers of the Customs in America, and for extending the same to the Naval Officers there", as continued by the Continuance of Certain Laws Act 1772 (12 Geo. 3. c. 56), from the expiration of those enactments until the end of the next session of parliament after 29 September 1778.

Section 13 of the act continued the Distemper Among Cattle Act 1770 (10 Geo. 3. c. 45), as continued by the Diseases Among Cattle Act 1772 (12 Geo. 3. c. 51), from the expiration of those enactments until the end of the next session of parliament after 29 September 1776.

Section 14 of the act extended the Customs, etc., Revenues Act 1725 (12 Geo. 1. c. 28), providing that from the passing of the act, the suing for, prosecuting, and recovering of any penalty or penalties inflicted by any act or acts of parliament then made or thereafter to be made for preventing the importation, wear, or use of any prohibited goods or commodities whatsoever in the kingdom, where his Majesty, his heirs or successors was, were, or might be entitled to any part or share of the penalty or penalties thereby incurred.

== Subsequent developments ==
The Select Committee on Temporary Laws, Expired or Expiring, appointed in 1796, inspected and considered all temporary laws, observing irregularities in the construction of expiring laws continuance acts, making recommendations and emphasising the importance of the Committee for Expired and Expiring Laws.

The whole act was repealed by section 1 of, and the schedule to, the Statute Law Revision Act 1871 (34 & 35 Vict. c. 116), which came into force on 21 August 1871.
