= Continuance of Laws (No. 2) Act 1766 =

Act of the Parliament of Great Britain

- Act of Parliament
- Parliament of Great Britain
- Long title: An Act to continue several Laws therein mentioned, relating to the clandestine Running of Uncustomed Goods, and preventing Frauds relating to the Customs; to prevent the clandestine Running of Goods, and the Danger of Infection thereby to the granting Liberty to carry Rice from His Majesty’s Provinces of Carolina and Georgia in America directly to any Part of Europe Southward of Cape Finisterre, in Ships built and navigated according to Law; and to the prohibiting the Importation of Books reprinted Abroad, and first composed, written, and printed, in Great Britain.
- Citation: 7 Geo. 3. c. 35
- Territorial extent: Great Britain

Dates
- Royal assent: 29 June 1767
- Commencement: 11 November 1766 (Note: Start of session.)
- Repealed: 21 August 1871
Other legislation
Amends	See § Continued enactments
Repealed by	Statute Law Revision Act 1871
Relates to	See Expiring laws continuance acts

Status: Repealed

Text of statute as originally enacted

The Continuance of Laws (No. 2) Act 1766 (7 Geo. 3. c. 35) was an act of the Parliament of Great Britain that continued various older acts.

== Background ==
In the United Kingdom, acts of Parliament remain in force until expressly repealed. Many acts of parliament, however, contained time-limited sunset clauses, requiring legislation to revive enactments that had expired or to continue enactments that would otherwise expire.

== Provisions ==
=== Continued enactments ===
Section 1 of the act continued certain clauses of the Adulteration of Coffee Act 1718 (5 Geo. 1. c. 11), as continued by the Continuance of Laws Act 1722 (9 Geo. 1. c. 8), the Unlawful Games Act 1728 (2 Geo. 2. c. 28), the Continuance of Laws (No. 2) Act 1734 (8 Geo. 2. c. 21), the Starr and Bent Act 1741 (15 Geo. 2. c. 33), the Continuance of Laws Act 1746 (20 Geo. 2. c. 47), the Continuance of Laws etc., Act 1754 (27 Geo. 2. c. 18) and the Continuance of Laws Act 1759 (33 Geo. 2. c. 16), from the expiration of those enactments to the end of the next session of parliament after 29 September 1774.

Section 2 of the act continued the Customs, etc. Act 1721 (8 Geo. 1. c. 18) "except the Clauses obliging all Ships and Vessels to perform Quarantine", as continued by the Continuance of Laws Act 1746 (20 Geo. 2. c. 47), corrected by the Insolvent Debtors Relief, etc. Act 1747 (21 Geo. 2. c. 33) and continued by the Continuance of Laws etc., Act 1754 (27 Geo. 2. c. 18) and the Continuance of Laws Act 1759 (33 Geo. 2. c. 16), from the expiration of those enactments until the end of the next session of parliament after 29 September 1774.

Section 3 of the act continued the Colonial Trade Act 1729 (3 Geo. 2. c. 28), as continued by the Colonial Trade Act 1734 (8 Geo. 2. c. 19), the Starr and Bent Act 1741 (15 Geo. 2. c. 33) , the Continuance of Laws Act 1746 (20 Geo. 2. c. 47), the Continuance of Laws etc., Act 1754 (27 Geo. 2. c. 18) and the Continuance of Laws Act 1759 (33 Geo. 2. c. 16), from the expiration of the act to the end of the next session of parliament after 29 September 1774.

Section 4 of the act continued the Importation Act 1738 (12 Geo. 2. c. 36) "as relates to the prohibiting the importation of books reprinted abroad, and first composed or written and printed in Great Britain", as continued by the Continuance of Laws Act 1746 (20 Geo. 2. c. 47), the Continuance of Laws etc., Act 1754 (27 Geo. 2. c. 18) and the Continuance of Laws Act 1759 (33 Geo. 2. c. 16), from the expiration of those enactments until the end of the next session of parliament after 29 September 1774.

== Subsequent developments ==
The Select Committee on Temporary Laws, Expired or Expiring, appointed in 1796, inspected and considered all temporary laws, observing irregularities in the construction of expiring laws continuance acts, making recommendations and emphasising the importance of the Committee for Expired and Expiring Laws.

The whole act was repealed by section 1 of, and the schedule to, the Statute Law Revision Act 1871 (34 & 35 Vict. c. 116).
