= Continuance of Laws Act 1759 =

Act of the Parliament of Great Britain

- Act of Parliament
- Parliament of Great Britain
- Long title: An Act to continue several Laws therein mentioned, relating to the clandestine Running of uncustomed Goods, and preventing Frauds relating to the Customs; to prevent the clandestine Running of Goods, and the Danger of Infection thereby; to the granting Liberty to carry Rice from His Majesty's Province of Carolina in America, directly to any Part of Europe Southward of Cape Finisterre, in Ships built and navigated according to Law; to the Free Importation of Cochineal and Indico; to the prohibiting the Importation of Books re-printed Abroad, and first composed, written, and printed, in Great Britain; and for allowing further Time for making Affidavits of the Execution of Articles or Contracts of Clerks to Attornies or Solicitors, and filing thereof.
- Citation: 33 Geo. 2. c. 16
- Territorial extent: Great Britain

Dates
- Royal assent: 22 May 1760
- Commencement: 13 November 1759 (Note: Start of session.)
- Repealed: 15 July 1867
Other legislation
Amends	See § Continued enactments
Repealed by	Statute Law Revision Act 1867
Relates to	See Expiring laws continuance acts

Status: Repealed

Text of statute as originally enacted

The Continuance of Laws Act 1759 (33 Geo. 2. c. 16) was an act of the Parliament of Great Britain that continued various older enactments.

== Background ==
In the United Kingdom, acts of Parliament remain in force until expressly repealed. Many acts of parliament, however, contained time-limited sunset clauses, requiring legislation to revive enactments that had expired or to continue enactments that would otherwise expire.

== Provisions ==
Section 1 of the act continued certain clauses of the Adulteration of Coffee Act 1718 (5 Geo. 1. c. 11), as continued by the Continuance of Laws Act 1722 (9 Geo. 1. c. 8), the Unlawful Games Act 1728 (2 Geo. 2. c. 28), the Continuance of Laws (No. 2) Act 1734 (8 Geo. 2. c. 21), the Starr and Bent Act 1741 (15 Geo. 2. c. 33), the Continuance of Laws Act 1746 (20 Geo. 2. c. 47) and the Continuance of Laws etc., Act 1754 (27 Geo. 2. c. 18), from the expiration of those enactments to the end of the next session of parliament after 29 September 1767.

Section 2 of the act continued the Customs, etc. Act 1721 (8 Geo. 1. c. 18) "except the Clauses obliging all Ships and Vessels to perform Quarantine", as continued by the Continuance of Laws Act 1746 (20 Geo. 2. c. 47) , corrected by the Insolvent Debtors Relief, etc. Act 1747 (21 Geo. 2. c. 33) and continued by the Continuance of Laws etc., Act 1754 (27 Geo. 2. c. 18), from the expiration of those enactments until the end of the next session of parliament after 29 September 1767.

Section 3 of the act continued the Colonial Trade Act 1729 (3 Geo. 2. c. 28), as continued by the Colonial Trade Act 1734 (8 Geo. 2. c. 19), the Starr and Bent Act 1741 (15 Geo. 2. c. 33) , the Continuance of Laws Act 1746 (20 Geo. 2. c. 47) and the Continuance of Laws etc., Act 1754 (27 Geo. 2. c. 18), from the expiration of the act to the end of the next session of parliament after 29 September 1767.

Section 4 of the act continued the Importation Act 1733 (7 Geo. 2. c. 18), as continued by the Continuance of Laws Act 1740 (14 Geo. 2. c. 34), the Continuance of Laws Act 1746 (20 Geo. 2. c. 47) and the Continuance of Laws etc., Act 1754 (27 Geo. 2. c. 18), from the expiration of the act until the end of the next session of parliament after 29 September 1767.

Section 5 of the act continued the Importation Act 1738 (12 Geo. 2. c. 36) "as relates to the prohibiting the importation of books reprinted abroad, and first composed or written and printed in Great Britain", as continued by the Continuance of Laws Act 1746 (20 Geo. 2. c. 47) and the Continuance of Laws etc., Act 1754 (27 Geo. 2. c. 18), from the expiration of those enactments until the end of the next session of parliament after 29 September 1767.

Section 6 of the act provided that people who had omitted to cause affidavits to be made and filed regarding the actual execution of contracts to serve as clerks to attorneys or solicitors would be granted further time until 6 November 1760, to file such affidavits, thereby indemnifying them from penalties, forfeitures, incapacities, and disabilities that would otherwise be incurred due to such neglect, with any affidavit filed by this date to be as effectual as if it had been made and filed within the originally required timeframe.

== Subsequent developments ==
The Select Committee on Temporary Laws, Expired or Expiring, appointed in 1796, inspected and considered all temporary laws, observing irregularities in the construction of expiring laws continuance acts, making recommendations and emphasising the importance of the Committee for Expired and Expiring Laws.

The whole act was repealed by section 1 of, and the schedule to, the Statute Law Revision Act 1867 (30 & 31 Vict. c. 59), which came into force on 15 July 1867.
