= Corporations Act 1718 =

Act of the Parliament of Great Britain

- Act of Parliament
- Parliament of Great Britain
- Long title: An Act for quieting and establishing Corporations.
- Citation: 5 Geo. 1. c. 6
- Territorial extent: Great Britain

Dates
- Royal assent: 18 February 1719
- Commencement: 11 November 1718 (Note: Start of session.)
- Repealed: 15 July 1867
Other legislation
Repealed by	Statute Law Revision Act 1867
Relates to	Corporation Act 1661

Status: Repealed

Text of statute as originally enacted

The Corporations Act 1718 (5 Geo. 1. c. 6) was an act of the Parliament of Great Britain. The act stated that members of municipal corporations were no longer required to take the oath against resistance nor to sign the repudiation of the Solemn League and Covenant. No person would be removed or prosecuted if they failed to take the sacramental test "unless such person be removed or such prosecution be commenced within six months of such person's being placed or elected into his respective office".

== Subsequent developments ==
The whole act was repealed by section 1 of, and the schedule to, the Statute Law Revision Act 1867 (30 & 31 Vict. c. 59).
