= Adulteration of Coffee Act 1718 =

Act of the Parliament of Great Britain

Adulteration of Coffee Act 1718 (Note: The citation of this act by this short title was authorised by section 1 of, and the first schedule to, the Short Titles Act 1896. Due to the repeal of those provisions it is now authorised by section 19(2) of the Interpretation Act 1978.)
- Act of Parliament
- Parliament of Great Britain
- Long title: An Act against clandestine Running of uncustomed Goods; and for the more effectual preventing of Frauds relating to the Customs.
- Citation: 5 Geo. 1. c. 11
- Territorial extent: Great Britain

Dates
- Royal assent: 18 April 1719
- Commencement: 25 March 1719 (Note: Section 1.)
- Repealed: England and Wales: 1 October 1939; Scotland: 23 July 1958

Other legislation
- Amended by: Adulteration of Tea Act 1776; Continuance of Laws Act 1722; Unlawful Games Act 1728; Continuance of Laws (No. 2) Act 1734; Starr and Bent Act 1741; Continuance of Laws etc., Act 1754; Continuance of Laws etc., Act 1754; Continuance of Laws Act 1759; Continuance of Laws (No. 2) Act 1766; Continuance of Laws, etc. Act 1774; Continuance of Laws Act 1781; Continuance of Laws Act 1788; Continuance of Laws Act 1796; Statute Law Revision Act 1867
- Repealed by: England and Wales: Food and Drugs Act 1938; Scotland: Statute Law Revision Act 1958

Status: Repealed

Text of statute as originally enacted

Adulteration of Tea Act 1776
- Act of Parliament
- Parliament of Great Britain
- Long title: An act for the more effectual prevention of the manufacturing ash, elder, floe, and other leaves, in imitation of tea, and to prevent frauds in the revenue of excise with respect to tea.
- Citation: 17 Geo. 3. c. 29
- Territorial extent: Great Britain

Dates
- Royal assent: 16 May 1777
- Commencement: 31 October 1776 (Note: Start of session.)
- Expired: 25 March 1778
- Repealed: 23 July 1958

Other legislation
- Amends: Adulteration of Coffee Act 1718
- Amended by: Statute Law Revision Act 1871; Statute Law Revision Act 1888
- Repealed by: Statute Law Revision Act 1958

Status: Repealed

Text of statute as originally enacted

The Adulteration of Coffee Act 1718 (5 Geo. 1. c. 11) was an act of the Parliament of Great Britain concerning the adulteration of coffee, which made it illegal to debase coffee.

== History ==
The act was passed in 1718. The act provided a penalty of £20 (equivalent to about £3,800 in 2025) "against divers [diverse] evil-disposed persons who at the time or soon after roasting of coffee, make use of water, grease, butter, or such like material whereby the same is made unwholesome and greatly increased in weight, to the prejudice of His Majesty's Revenue, the health of his subjects, and to the loss of all fair and honest dealers."

When coffee fell out of fashion, in favour of tea, a similar law was then introduced, the Adulteration of Tea Act 1776 (17 Geo. 3. c. 29).

When recent Governor of Ceylon Viscount Torrington presented a petition in 1854 to similar, reinforcing effect, namely to counter the use of chicory for mixing—as coffee was by 1854 subject to a duty of 75% on top of the London market price—he stressed another piece of legislation had strong effect. He also mentioned coffee as the main export item at that time of Ceylon. This reinforcement was the act Excise Act 1803 (43 Geo. 3. c. 129) such that no vegetable substance resembling coffee was permitted on the premises of licensed coffee dealers.

== Subsequent developments ==
Sections 3, 4, 6, 7 8, 10, 2 and 5 of the act were continued until the end of the next session of parliament after 5 years from the expiration of those enactments by section 8 of the Continuance of Laws Act 1722 (9 Geo. 1. c. 8).

The act as relates to the "importation of foreign brandy, arrack, rum, strong waters or spirits, in any ship, vessel or boat, under the burden of fifteen tuns" was revived and continued from 1 May 1729 until the end of the next session of parliament after 29 September 1734 by section 1 of the Unlawful Games Act 1728 (2 Geo. 2. c. 28).

Several clauses of the act were continued from the expiration of those enactments until the end of the next session of parliament after 29 September 1742 by section 3 of the Continuance of Laws (No. 2) Act 1734 (8 Geo. 2. c. 21).

Several clauses of the act were continued until the end of the next session of parliament after 1 June 1754 by section 5 of the Continuance of Laws Act 1746 (20 Geo. 2. c. 47).

So much of the act as relates "to such foreign Goods, Wares, and Merchandizes, as shall be taken in at Sea, out of any Ship or Vessel, in order to be landed or put into any other Ship, Vessel, or Boat; and also relating to Goods not reported, and found after clearing Ships; and whereby further Remedies are provided against relanding Goods prohibited to be worn in this Kingdom, and foreign Goods shipped out for Parts beyond the Seas; and also relating to the opening or altering the Package of Goods on board Ships outward bound; and also relating to hovering Ships or Vessels of the Burthen of fifty Tons or under; and also concerning the Bales or Package in which Coffee shall be exported; and also relating to Rum imported in Casks or Vessels not containing twenty Gallons at the least; and also relating to Certificate Goods entered in order to be exported to Ireland" was continued until the end of the next session of parliament after 1 June 1747 by section 3 of the Starr and Bent Act 1741 (15 Geo. 2. c. 33).

So much of the act as relates "to such foreign Goods, Wares, and Merchandizes, as shall be taken in at Sea, out of any Ship or Vessel, in order to be landed or put into any other Ship, Vessel, or Boat; and also relating to Goods not reported, and found after clearing Ships; and whereby further Remedies are provided against relanding Goods prohibited to be worn in this Kingdom, and foreign Goods shipped out for Parts beyond the Seas; and also relating to the opening or altering the Package of Goods on board Ships outward bound; and also relating to hovering Ships or Vessels of the Burthen of fifty Tons or under; and also concerning the Bales or Package in which Coffee shall be exported; and also relating to Rum imported in Casks or Vessels not containing twenty Gallons at the least; and also relating to Certificate Goods entered in order to be exported to Ireland" was continued from the expiration of the act to the end of the next session of parliament after 29 September 1760 by section 4 of the Continuance of Laws etc., Act 1754 (27 Geo. 2. c. 18).

So much of the act as relates "to such foreign Goods, Wares, and Merchandizes, as shall be taken in at Sea, out of any Ship or Vessel, in order to be landed or put into any other Ship, Vessel, or Boat; and also relating to Goods not reported, and found after clearing Ships; and whereby further Remedies are provided against relanding Goods prohibited to be worn in this Kingdom, and foreign Goods shipped out for Parts beyond the Seas; and also relating to the opening or altering the Package of Goods on board Ships outward bound; and also relating to hovering Ships or Vessels of the Burthen of fifty Tons or under; and also concerning the Bales or Package in which Coffee shall be exported; and also relating to Rum imported in Casks or Vessels not containing twenty Gallons at the least; and also relating to Certificate Goods entered in order to be exported to Ireland" was continued from the expiration of the act to the end of the next session of parliament after 29 September 1767 by section 1 of the Continuance of Laws etc., Act 1754 (27 Geo. 2. c. 18).

So much of the act as relates "to such foreign Goods, Wares, and Merchandizes, as shall be taken in at Sea, out of any Ship or Vessel, in order to be landed or put into any other Ship, Vessel, or Boat; and also relating to Goods not reported, and found after clearing Ships; and whereby further Remedies are provided against relanding Goods prohibited to be worn in this Kingdom, and foreign Goods shipped out for Parts beyond the Seas; and also relating to the opening or altering the Package of Goods on board Ships outward bound; and also relating to hovering Ships or Vessels of the Burthen of fifty Tons or under; and also concerning the Bales or Package in which Coffee shall be exported; and also relating to Rum imported in Casks or Vessels not containing twenty Gallons at the least; and also relating to Certificate Goods entered in order to be exported to Ireland" was continued from the expiration of the act to the end of the next session of parliament after 29 September 1774 by section 1 of the Continuance of Laws (No. 2) Act 1766 (7 Geo. 3. c. 35).

So much of the act as relates "to such foreign Goods, Wares, and Merchandizes, as shall be taken in at Sea, out of any Ship or Vessel, in order to be landed or put into any other Ship, Vessel, or Boat; and also relating to Goods not reported, and found after clearing Ships; and whereby further Remedies are provided against relanding Goods prohibited to be worn in this Kingdom, and foreign Goods shipped out for Parts beyond the Seas; and also relating to the opening or altering the Package of Goods on board Ships outward bound; and also relating to hovering Ships or Vessels of the Burthen of fifty Tons or under; and also concerning the Bales or Package in which Coffee shall be exported; and also relating to Rum imported in Casks or Vessels not containing twenty Gallons at the least; and also relating to Certificate Goods entered in order to be exported to Ireland" was continued from the expiration of the act to the end of the next session of parliament after 29 September 1781 by section 2 of the Continuance of Laws, etc. Act 1774 (14 Geo. 3. c. 86).

So much of the act as relates "to such foreign Goods, Wares, and Merchandizes, as shall be taken in at Sea, out of any Ship or Vessel, in order to be landed or put into any other Ship, Vessel, or Boat; and also relating to Goods not reported, and found after clearing Ships; and whereby further Remedies are provided against relanding Goods prohibited to be worn in this Kingdom, and foreign Goods shipped out for Parts beyond the Seas; and also relating to the opening or altering the Package of Goods on board Ships outward bound; and also relating to hovering Ships or Vessels of the Burthen of fifty Tons or under; and also concerning the Bales or Package in which Coffee shall be exported; and also relating to Rum imported in Casks or Vessels not containing twenty Gallons at the least; and also relating to Certificate Goods entered in order to be exported to Ireland" was continued from the expiration of the act to the end of the next session of parliament after 29 September 1788 by section 5 of the Continuance of Laws Act 1781 (21 Geo. 3. c. 29).

So much of the act as relates "to such foreign Goods, Wares, and Merchandizes, as shall be taken in at Sea, out of any Ship or Vessel, in order to be landed or put into any other Ship, Vessel, or Boat; and also relating to Goods not reported, and found after clearing Ships; and whereby further Remedies are provided against relanding Goods prohibited to be worn in this Kingdom, and foreign Goods shipped out for Parts beyond the Seas; and also relating to the opening or altering the Package of Goods on board Ships outward bound; and also relating to hovering Ships or Vessels of the Burthen of fifty Tons or under; and also concerning the Bales or Package in which Coffee shall be exported; and also relating to Rum imported in Casks or Vessels not containing twenty Gallons at the least; and also relating to Certificate Goods entered in order to be exported to Ireland" was continued from the expiration of the act to the end of the next session of parliament after 29 September 1795 by section 1 of the Continuance of Laws Act 1788 (28 Geo. 3. c. 23).

So much of the act as relates "to such foreign Goods, Wares, and Merchandizes, as shall be taken in at Sea, out of any Ship or Vessel, in order to be landed or put into any other Ship, Vessel, or Boat; and also relating to Goods not reported, and found after clearing Ships; and whereby further Remedies are provided against relanding Goods prohibited to be worn in this Kingdom, and foreign Goods shipped out for Parts beyond the Seas; and also relating to the opening or altering the Package of Goods on board Ships outward bound; and also relating to hovering Ships or Vessels of the Burthen of fifty Tons or under; and also concerning the Bales or Package in which Coffee shall be exported; and also relating to Rum imported in Casks or Vessels not containing twenty Gallons at the least; and also relating to Certificate Goods entered in order to be exported to Ireland" was continued from the expiration of the act to the end of the next session of parliament after 29 September 1802 by section 12 of the Continuance of Laws Act 1796 (36 Geo. 3. c. 40).

The whole act except section 23 was repealed by section 1 of, and the schedule to, the Statute Law Revision Act 1867 (30 & 31 Vict. c. 59), which came into force on 15 July 1867.

The whole act was repealed for England and Wales by section 101(1) of, and the first part of the fourth schedule to, the Food and Drugs Act 1938 (1 & 2 Geo. 6. c. 56), which came into force on 1 October 1939.

The whole act was repealed for Scotland by section 1 of, and the first schedule to, the Statute Law Revision Act 1958 (6 & 7 Eliz. 2. c. 46), which came into force on 23 July 1958.
