= Continuance of Laws etc., Act 1754 =

Act of the Parliament of Great Britain

- Act of Parliament
- Parliament of Great Britain
- Long title: An Act to continue several Laws, for prohibiting the Importation of Books re-printed Abroad, and first composed or written and printed in Great Britain; for the free Importation of Cochineal and Indico; and relating to Rice, Frauds in the Customs, the clandestine Running of Goods, and to Copper Ore; and for the better Encouragement of the making of Sail Cloth in Great Britain; and to authorize the Payment of the Bounty to Alexander Brown and others, upon a Ship fitted out for the Whale Fishery, and lost in the Greenland Seas; and for the more effectual Payment of the Bounties upon British-made Sail Cloth to Robert Donald and others.
- Citation: 27 Geo. 2. c. 18
- Territorial extent: Great Britain

Dates
- Royal assent: 6 April 1754
- Commencement: 15 November 1753 (Note: Start of session.)
- Repealed: 15 July 1867
Other legislation
Amends	See § Continued enactments
Repealed by	Statute Law Revision Act 1867
Relates to	See Expiring laws continuance acts

Status: Repealed

Text of statute as originally enacted

The Continuance of Laws etc., Act 1754 (27 Geo. 2. c. 18) was an act of the Parliament of Great Britain that continued various older acts.

== Background ==
In the United Kingdom, acts of Parliament remain in force until expressly repealed. Many acts of parliament, however, contained time-limited sunset clauses, requiring legislation to revive enactments that had expired or to continue enactments that would otherwise expire.

== Provisions ==
=== Continued enactments ===
Section 1 of the act continued the Importation Act 1738 (12 Geo. 2. c. 36) "as relates to the prohibiting the importation of books reprinted abroad, and first composed or written and printed in Great Britain", as continued by the Continuance of Laws Act 1746 (20 Geo. 2. c. 47), from the expiration of those enactments until the end of the next session of parliament after 29 September 1760.

Section 2 of the act continued the Importation Act 1733 (7 Geo. 2. c. 18), as continued by the Continuance of Laws Act 1740 (14 Geo. 2. c. 34) and the Continuance of Laws Act 1746 (20 Geo. 2. c. 47), from the expiration of the act until the end of the next session of parliament after 29 September 1760.

Section 3 of the act continued the Colonial Trade Act 1729 (3 Geo. 2. c. 28), as continued by the Colonial Trade Act 1734 (8 Geo. 2. c. 19), the Starr and Bent Act 1741 (15 Geo. 2. c. 33) and the Continuance of Laws Act 1746 (20 Geo. 2. c. 47), from the expiration of the act to the end of the next session of parliament after 29 September 1760.

Section 4 of the act continued certain clauses of the Adulteration of Coffee Act 1718 (5 Geo. 1. c. 11), as continued by the Continuance of Laws Act 1722 (9 Geo. 1. c. 8), the Unlawful Games Act 1728 (2 Geo. 2. c. 28), the Continuance of Laws (No. 2) Act 1734 (8 Geo. 2. c. 21), the Starr and Bent Act 1741 (15 Geo. 2. c. 33) and the Continuance of Laws Act 1746 (20 Geo. 2. c. 47), from the expiration of those enactments to the end of the next session of parliament after 29 September 1760.

Section 5 of the act continued the Customs, etc. Act 1721 (8 Geo. 1. c. 18) "except the Clauses obliging all Ships and Vessels to perform Quarantine", as continued by the Continuance of Laws Act 1746 (20 Geo. 2. c. 47) and corrected by the Insolvent Debtors Relief, etc. Act 1747 (21 Geo. 2. c. 33), from the expiration of those enactments until the end of the next session of parliament after 29 September 1760.

Section 6 of the act continued the Sail Cloth Manufacture Act 1712 (12 Ann. c. 12) (Note: This is the citation in The Statutes of the Realm.), as continued by the Continuance of Laws Act 1718 (5 Geo. 1. c. 25), the Continuance of Laws, etc. Act 1723 (10 Geo. 1. c. 17),the Continuance of Laws Act 1734 (8 Geo. 2. c. 18), the Making of Sail Cloth, etc. Act 1741 (15 Geo. 2. c. 35) and the Stamps Act 1746 (20 Geo. 2. c. 45), from the expiration of the act until the end of the next session of parliament after 29 September 1760.

Section 7 of the act provided that the commissioners of the treasury, or any three or more of them, were empowered to direct payment of bounties to Alexander Brown and George Steel for their vessel lost in the Greenland Seas in 1751 while engaged in the whale fishery, bounties to which they would have been entitled had the ship returned to the kingdom.

Section 8 of the act provided that the sum of £1,358 11s 10d due to John Stevenson and company, and Robert Donald and company, for bounties on British-made sail cloth exported from Scotland on or before 1 June 1750, should be paid out of the old subsidy collected in Scotland that was applicable to the payment of incidents, as the established fund for payment of bounties was insufficient to cover these debts without more effectual provision.

== Subsequent developments ==
The Select Committee on Temporary Laws, Expired or Expiring, appointed in 1796, inspected and considered all temporary laws, observing irregularities in the construction of expiring laws continuance acts, making recommendations and emphasising the importance of the Committee for Expired and Expiring Laws.

The whole act was repealed by section 1 of, and the schedule to, the Statute Law Revision Act 1867 (30 & 31 Vict. c. 59).
