= Insolvent Debtors Relief, etc. Act 1747 =

Act of the Parliament of Great Britain

- Act of Parliament
- Parliament of Great Britain
- Long title: An Act to continue and amend several Laws for the Relief of Debtors, with respect to the Imprisonment of their Persons, and to rectify a Mistake in an Act passed in the last Session of Parliament, for continuing several Laws therein mentioned, and to continue Two Acts, the One passed in the Nineteenth Year, the other in the Twentieth Year, of His present Majesty's Reign, to prevent the spreading of the Distemper amongst the Horned Cattle.
- Citation: 21 Geo. 2. c. 33
- Territorial extent: Great Britain

Dates
- Royal assent: 13 May 1748
- Commencement: 10 November 1747 (Note: Start of session.)
- Repealed: 15 July 1867
Other legislation
Amends	Continuance of Laws Act 1746; See § Continued enactments
Amended by	Cattle Distemper, Vagrancy, Marshalsea Prison, etc. Act 1753
Repealed by	Statute Law Revision Act 1867
Relates to	See Expiring laws continuance acts

Status: Repealed

Text of statute as originally enacted

The Insolvent Debtors Relief, etc. Act 1747 (21 Geo. 2. c. 33) was an act of the Parliament of Great Britain that continued various older enactments.

== Background ==
In the United Kingdom, acts of Parliament remain in force until expressly repealed. Many acts of parliament, however, contained time-limited sunset clauses, requiring legislation to revive enactments that had expired or to continue enactments that would otherwise expire.

== Provisions ==
=== Continued enactments ===
Section 1 of the act continued the Insolvent Debtors Relief (No. 2) Act 1728 (2 Geo. 2. c. 22), as amended by the Insolvent Debtors Relief Act 1729 (3 Geo. 2. c. 27) and amended and continued by the Set-off Act 1734 (8 Geo. 2. c. 24) and as continued by the Continuance of Laws Act 1740 (14 Geo. 2. c. 34), from the expiration of the act until the end of the next session of parliament after, 1 June 1754, except the clause for setting mutual debts one against each other.

Section 2 of the act provided that anyone petitioning for relief under the Insolvent Debtors Relief (No. 2) Act 1728 (2 Geo. 2. c. 22) must set forth in their petition an account of all real and personal property they were entitled to both at the time of petition and at their first imprisonment, and must take a special oath administered by the court rather than the previously required oath.

Section 3 of the act corrected the expiration of the Customs, etc. Act 1721 (8 Geo. 1. c. 18) by section 6 by the Continuance of Laws Act 1746 (20 Geo. 2. c. 47) to be from the expiration of the act until the end of the next session of parliament after 1 June 1754.

Section 4 of the act continued the Distemper Amongst Cattle Act 1745 (19 Geo. 2. c. 5) and the Distemper Amongst Cattle Act 1746 (20 Geo. 2. c. 4) from the expiration of the acts until the end of the next session of parliament after 24 September 1748.

== Legacy ==
The Select Committee on Temporary Laws, Expired or Expiring, appointed in 1796, inspected and considered all temporary laws, observing irregularities in the construction of expiring laws continuance acts, making recommendations and emphasising the importance of the Committee for Expired and Expiring Laws.

The whole act was repealed by section 1 of, and the schedule to, the Statute Law Revision Act 1867 (30 & 31 Vict. c. 59).
