= Continuance of Laws Act 1746 =

Act of the Parliament of Great Britain

- Act of Parliament
- Parliament of Great Britain
- Long title: An Act to continue several Laws, for prohibiting the Importation of Books re-printed Abroad, and first composed or written and printed in Great Britain, for preventing Exactions of the Occupiers of Locks and Wears upon the River of Thames Westward, and for ascertaining the Rates of Water-carriage upon the said River, and for better securing the lawful Trade of His Majesty's Subjects to and from The East Indies, and for the more effectual preventing all His Majesty's Subjects trading thither under Foreign Commissions, and relating to Rice, to Frauds in the Customs, to the clandestine Running of Goods, and to Copper One of the British Plantations, and for the free Importation of Cochineal and Indico, and for Punishment of Persons destroying Turnpikes or Locks, or other Works erected by Authority of Parliament.
- Citation: 20 Geo. 2. c. 47
- Territorial extent: Great Britain

Dates
- Royal assent: 17 June 1747
- Commencement: 18 November 1746 (Note: Start of session.)
- Repealed: 15 July 1867
Other legislation
| Amends | See § Continued enactments |
| Amended by | Insolvent Debtors Relief, etc. Act 1747 |
| Repealed by | Statute Law Revision Act 1867 |
| Relates to | See Expiring laws continuance acts |

Status: Repealed

Text of statute as originally enacted

The Continuance of Laws Act 1746 (20 Geo. 2. c. 47) was an act of the Parliament of Great Britain that continued various older acts.

== Background ==
In the United Kingdom, acts of Parliament remain in force until expressly repealed. Many acts of parliament, however, contained time-limited sunset clauses, requiring legislation to revive enactments that had expired or to continue enactments that would otherwise expire.

== Provisions ==
=== Continued enactments ===
Section 1 of the act continued the Importation Act 1738 (12 Geo. 2. c. 36) "as relates to the prohibiting the importation of books reprinted abroad, and first composed or written and printed in Great Britain", from the expiration of those enactments until the end of the next session of parliament after 29 September 1754.

Section 2 of the act continued the Thames Navigation Act 1729 (3 Geo. 2. c. 11), as continued by the Laws Continuance, etc. Act 1739 (13 Geo. 2. c. 18) (Note: The margin note incorrectly cites this act as "13 Geo. 2. c. 8".), from the expiration of the act until 1 June 1749.

Section 3 of the act continued the Trade to East Indies Act 1731 (5 Geo. 2. c. 29), as continued by the Laws Continuance, etc. Act 1739 (13 Geo. 2. c. 18), from the expiration of the act until 25 March 1780.

Section 4 of the act continued the Colonial Trade Act 1729 (3 Geo. 2. c. 28), as continued by the Colonial Trade Act 1734 (8 Geo. 2. c. 19) and the Starr and Bent Act 1741 (15 Geo. 2. c. 33), from the expiration of the act until 1 June 1754.

Section 5 of the act continued certain clauses of the Adulteration of Coffee Act 1718 (5 Geo. 1. c. 11), as continued by the Continuance of Laws Act 1722 (9 Geo. 1. c. 8), the Unlawful Games Act 1728 (2 Geo. 2. c. 28), the Continuance of Laws (No. 2) Act 1734 (8 Geo. 2. c. 21) and the Starr and Bent Act 1741 (15 Geo. 2. c. 33), from the expiration of those enactments until the end of the next session of parliament after 1 June 1754.

Section 6 of the act continued the Customs, etc. Act 1721 (8 Geo. 1. c. 18) "except the Clauses obliging all Ships and Vessels to perform Quarantine", as continued by the Continuance of Laws, etc. Act 1724 (11 Geo. 1. c. 29), the Colonial Trade Act 1729 (2 Geo. 2. c. 28), the Continuance of Laws (No. 2) Act 1734 (8 Geo. 2. c. 21) and the Starr and Bent Act 1741 (15 Geo. 2. c. 33), from the expiration of those enactments until the end of the next session of parliament after 1 June 1747.

Section 7 of the act continued the Importation Act 1733 (7 Geo. 2. c. 18), as continued by the Continuance of Laws Act 1740 (14 Geo. 2. c. 34), from the expiration of the act until the end of the next session of parliament after 1 June 1754.

Section 8 of the act continued the Destruction of Turnpikes, etc. Act 1731 (5 Geo. 2. c. 22) and the Destruction of Turnpikes, etc. Act 1734 (8 Geo. 2. c. 20), as revived and continued by the Starr and Bent Act 1741 (15 Geo. 2. c. 33), from the expiration of the act until the end of the next session of parliament after 1 June 1754.

== Subsequent developments ==
The expiration of the Customs, etc. Act 1721 (8 Geo. 1. c. 18) by section 6 of the act was corrected to be until the end of the next session of parliament after 1 June 1754 by section 3 of the Insolvent Debtors Relief, etc. Act 1747 (21 Geo. 2. c. 33).

The Select Committee on Temporary Laws, Expired or Expiring, appointed in 1796, inspected and considered all temporary laws, observing irregularities in the construction of expiring laws continuance acts, making recommendations and emphasising the importance of the Committee for Expired and Expiring Laws.

The whole act was repealed by section 1 of, and the schedule to, the Statute Law Revision Act 1867 (30 & 31 Vict. c. 59).
