= Starr and Bent Act 1741 =

Act of the Parliament of Great Britain

Starr and Bent Act 1741 (Note: The citation of this act by this short title was authorised by section 1 of, and the first schedule to, the Short Titles Act 1896. Due to the repeal of those provisions it is now authorised by section 19(2) of the Interpretation Act 1978.)
- Act of Parliament
- Parliament of Great Britain
- Long title: An Act to revive several Acts, for the Punishment of Persons destroying Turnpikes or Locks, or other Works erected by Authority of Parliament, and for other Purposes therein mentioned; and to continue several Acts, relating to Rice, to Frauds in the Customs, to the clandestine Running of Goods, and to Copper Ore of the British Plantations; and for extending the Liberty given by the Act of the Twelfth Year of the Reign of His present Majesty,[s] for carrying Sugar of the Growth of the British Sugar Colonies in America, to Ships belonging to any of His Majesty's Subjects residing in Great Britain, and navigated according to Law; and for the more effectual preventing the cutting of Star or Bent.
- Citation: 15 Geo. 2. c. 33
- Territorial extent: Great Britain

Dates
- Royal assent: 15 July 1742
- Commencement: 1 December 1741 (Note: Start of session.)
- Repealed: 1 January 1969

Other legislation
- Amends: See § Revived and continued enactments
- Amended by: Justices of the Peace Act 1949; Magistrates' Courts Act 1952
- Repealed by: Theft Act 1968
- Relates to: See Expiring laws continuance acts

Status: Repealed

Text of statute as originally enacted

The Starr and Bent Act 1741 (15 Geo. 2. c. 33) was an act of the Parliament of Great Britain that revived and continued various older acts.

== Background ==
In the United Kingdom, acts of Parliament remain in force until expressly repealed. Many acts of parliament, however, contained time-limited sunset clauses, requiring legislation to revive enactments that had expired or to continue enactments that would otherwise expire.

== Provisions ==
=== Revived and continued enactments ===
Section 1 of the act revived and continued the Destruction of Turnpikes, etc. Act 1731 (5 Geo. 2. c. 33), the Destruction of Turnpikes, etc. Act 1727 (1 Geo. 2. St. 2. c. 19) (Note: The margin note cites this as "1 Geo. 2. c. 19".) and the Destruction of Turnpikes, etc. Act 1734 (8 Geo. 2. c. 20) from 1 June 1742 until 1 June 1747.

Section 2 of the act continued the Colonial Trade Act 1729 (3 Geo. 2. c. 28) from the expiration of the act until the end of the next session of parliament after 1 June 1747, and extended the act to cover the Province of Georgia.

Section 3 of the act continued the Adulteration of Coffee Act 1718 (5 Geo. 2. c. 11) as relates "to such foreign Goods, Wares, and Merchandizes, as shall be taken in at Sea, out of any Ship or Vessel, in order to be landed or put into any other Ship, Vessel, or Boat; and also relating to Goods not reported, and found after clearing Ships; and whereby further Remedies are provided against relanding Goods prohibited to be worn in this Kingdom, and foreign Goods shipped out for Parts beyond the Seas; and also relating to the opening or altering the Package of Goods on board Ships outward bound; and also relating to hovering Ships or Vessels of the Burthen of fifty Tons or under; and also concerning the Bales or Package in which Coffee shall be exported; and also relating to Rum imported in Casks or Vessels not containing twenty Gallons at the least; and also relating to Certificate Goods entered in order to be exported to Ireland", as continued by the Continuance of Laws Act 1722 (9 Geo. 1. c. 8) (Note: The margin note incorrectly cites this as "9 Geo. 2. c. 8".), the Unlawful Games Act 1728 (2 Geo. 2. c. 28) and the Continuance of Laws (No. 2) Act 1734 (8 Geo. 2. c. 21), until the end of the next session of parliament after 1 June 1747.

Section 4 of the act continued the Customs, etc. Act 1721 (8 Geo. 1. c. 18), as continued by the Continuance of Laws, etc. Act 1724 (11 Geo. 1. c. 29) and the Continuance of Laws (No. 2) Act 1734 (8 Geo. 2. c. 21), until the end of the next session of parliament after 1 June 1747, except as relates to ships or vessels performing quarantine.

Section 5 of the act provided that after 29 September 1742, British ships navigated according to law could transport sugar directly from American colonies to any foreign parts of Europe, extending privileges previously granted to ships built in Great Britain to all ships belonging to British subjects, subject to the same rules and restrictions established in the Colonial Trade Act 1738 (12 Geo. 2. c. 30).

Section 6 of the act provided that after September 29, 1742, anyone cutting or removing Starr or Bent grasses planted to stabilize sand dunes on the northwest coasts of England would be fined ten shillings (half to the informer, half to the landowner), with repeat offenders being committed to the House of Correction for three months of hard labor, and further offenses resulting in one year of imprisonment with whipping.

Section 7 of the act provided that anyone found in possession of Starr or Bent grass within five miles of sand-hills would be presumed guilty of cutting it and fined twenty shillings (half to the informer, half to the landowner), with imprisonment for three months of hard labor if unable to pay the fine.

Section 8 of the act provided that nothing in this legislation would prohibit or restrain any person from exercising or enjoying any ancient prescriptive right to cut Starr or Bent grass in the County of Cumberland.

Section 9 of the act provided that after 29 September 1742, anyone pulling Bent from sand-hills in Scotland, either by themselves or through others, would be subject to the same penalties and forfeitures as established by the Soil Preservation Act 1695 (1695 c. 54) (Note: This is the citation in the Record Edition.), with the same presumption of guilt applying to those found in possession of Bent within eight miles of Scottish sand-hills.

== Subsequent developments ==
The Select Committee on Temporary Laws, Expired or Expiring, appointed in 1796, inspected and considered all temporary laws, observing irregularities in the construction of expiring laws continuance acts, making recommendations and emphasising the importance of the Committee for Expired and Expiring Laws.

The whole act was repealed by section 33(3) of, and part II of schedule 3 to, the Theft Act 1968 (c. 60), which came into force on 1 January 1969.
