= Continuance of Laws Act 1740 =

Act of the Parliament of Great Britain

- Act of Parliament
- Parliament of Great Britain
- Long title: An Act to continue an Act for Relief of Debtors, with respect to the Imprisonment of their Persons, and Two subsequent Acts, for explaining and amending the same; and also to continue an Act for the free Importation of Cochineal and Indico.
- Citation: 14 Geo. 2. c. 34
- Territorial extent: Great Britain

Dates
- Royal assent: 8 April 1741
- Commencement: 18 November 1740 (Note: Start of session.)
- Repealed: 15 July 1867
Other legislation
Amends	See § Continued enactments
Repealed by	Statute Law Revision Act 1867
Relates to	See Expiring laws continuance acts

Status: Repealed

Text of statute as originally enacted

The Continuance of Laws Act 1740 (14 Geo. 2. c. 34) was an act of the Parliament of Great Britain that continued various older acts.

== Background ==
In the United Kingdom, acts of Parliament remain in force until expressly repealed. Many acts of parliament, however, contained time-limited sunset clauses, requiring legislation to revive enactments that had expired or to continue enactments that would otherwise expire.

== Provisions ==
=== Continued enactments ===
Section 1 of the act continued the Insolvent Debtors Relief (No. 2) Act 1728 (2 Geo. 2. c. 22), the Insolvent Debtors Relief Act 1729 (3 Geo. 2. c. 27) and the Set-off Act 1734 (8 Geo. 2. c. 24), except the clause in the Set-off Act 1734 (8 Geo. 2. c. 24) for setting mutual debts one against the other, from the expiration of those acts until the end of the next session of parliament after 1 June 1747.

Section 2 of the act continued the Importation Act 1733 (7 Geo. 2. c. 18) from the expiration of the act until the end of the next session of parliament after 1 June 1747.

== Legacy ==
The Select Committee on Temporary Laws, Expired or Expiring, appointed in 1796, inspected and considered all temporary laws, observing irregularities in the construction of expiring laws continuance acts, making recommendations and emphasising the importance of the Committee for Expired and Expiring Laws.

The whole act was repealed by section 1 of, and the schedule to, the Statute Law Revision Act 1867 (30 & 31 Vict. c. 59).
