= List of acts of the Parliament of Great Britain from 1729 =

This is a complete list of acts of the Parliament of Great Britain for the year 1729.

For acts passed until 1707, see the list of acts of the Parliament of England and the list of acts of the Parliament of Scotland. See also the list of acts of the Parliament of Ireland.

For acts passed from 1801 onwards, see the list of acts of the Parliament of the United Kingdom. For acts of the devolved parliaments and assemblies in the United Kingdom, see the list of acts of the Scottish Parliament, the list of acts of the Northern Ireland Assembly, and the list of acts and measures of Senedd Cymru; see also the list of acts of the Parliament of Northern Ireland.

The number shown after each act's title is its chapter number. Acts are cited using this number, preceded by the year(s) of the reign during which the relevant parliamentary session was held; thus the Union with Ireland Act 1800 is cited as "39 & 40 Geo. 3. c. 67", meaning the 67th act passed during the session that started in the 39th year of the reign of George III and which finished in the 40th year of that reign. Note that the modern convention is to use Arabic numerals in citations (thus "41 Geo. 3" rather than "41 Geo. III"). Acts of the last session of the Parliament of Great Britain and the first session of the Parliament of the United Kingdom are both cited as "41 Geo. 3".

Acts passed by the Parliament of Great Britain did not have a short title; however, some of these acts have subsequently been given a short title by acts of the Parliament of the United Kingdom (such as the Short Titles Act 1896).

Before the Acts of Parliament (Commencement) Act 1793 came into force on 8 April 1793, acts passed by the Parliament of Great Britain were deemed to have come into effect on the first day of the session in which they were passed. Because of this, the years given in the list below may in fact be the year before a particular act was passed.

== 3 Geo. 2 ==
The third session of the 7th Parliament of Great Britain, which met from 13 January 1730 until 15 May 1730.

=== Public acts ===
Short title	Citation	Royal assent
Long title
Land Tax Act 1729 (repealed)	3 Geo. 2. c. 1	20 February 1730
An Act for granting an Aid to His Majesty, by a Land Tax, to be raised in Great Britain, for the Service of the Year One Thousand Seven Hundred and Thirty. (Repealed by Statute Law Revision Act 1867 (30 & 31 Vict. c. 59))
Mutiny Act 1729 (repealed)	3 Geo. 2. c. 2	24 March 1730
An Act for punishing Mutiny and Desertion; and for the better Payment of the Army and their Quarters. (Repealed by Statute Law Revision Act 1867 (30 & 31 Vict. c. 59))
St. Mary Stratford Bow Church Act 1729	3 Geo. 2. c. 3	24 March 1730
An Act for providing a Maintenance for the Minister of the Parish Church of St. Mary Stratford Bow, in the County of Middlesex.
Buxton to Manchester Road Act 1729 (repealed)	3 Geo. 2. c. 4	24 March 1730
An Act for making more effectual an Act passed in the Eleventh Year of the Reign of His late Majesty King George the First, (Note: Derbyshire Roads Act 1724 (11 Geo. 1. c. 13)) for repairing and widening the Road from Sherbrook Hill, near Buxton and Chapple in the Frith, in the County of Derby, to Manchester, in the County of Lancaster. (Repealed by Manchester to Buxton Road Act 1793 (33 Geo. 3. c. 171))
Advance of Money to Foreign States Act 1729 (repealed)	3 Geo. 2. c. 5	24 March 1730
An Act to enable His Majesty to prohibit any Person or Persons, His Majesty's Subjects, or residing within this Kingdom, to advance or lend any Sum or Sums of Money to any Foreign Prince, State, or Potentate, without Licence obtained from His Majesty, under His Privy Seal, or some greater Authority. (Repealed by Statute Law Revision Act 1867 (30 & 31 Vict. c. 59))
Shropshire Roads Act 1729 (repealed)	3 Geo. 2. c. 6	24 March 1730
An Act for making more effectual an Act passed in the Twelfth Year of the Reign of His late Majesty King George the First, (Note: Shropshire Roads Act 1725 (12 Geo. 1. c. 9)) for repairing the Roads therein mentioned, between Crackley Bank, in the Parish of Idsall, alias Shifnall, and the Town of Shrewsbury, in the County of Salop. (Repealed by Watling Street Road Act 1808 (48 Geo. 3. c. lxv))
Taxation, etc. Act 1729 (repealed)	3 Geo. 2. c. 7	15 May 1730
An Act for continuing the Duties upon Malt, Mum, Cyder, and Perry, in that Part of Great Britain called England; and for granting to His Majesty certain Duties upon Malt, Mum, Cyder, and Perry, in that Part of Great Britain called Scotland, for the Service of the Year One Thousand Seven Hundred and Thirty; for exempting from the said Duties Cyder and Perry used for Distilling; for ascertaining the Bounty for Malt exported; for better preventing Frauds in the Malting of Corn for Exportation; for making good the Deficiency of a late Malt Act; and for giving further Time to Clerks and Apprentices to pay Duties omitted to be paid for their Indentures and Contracts. (Repealed by Statute Law Revision Act 1867 (30 & 31 Vict. c. 59))
Parliamentary Elections, Norwich Act 1729 (repealed)	3 Geo. 2. c. 8	15 May 1730
An Act for the better regulating Elections in the City of Norwich; and for preserving the Peace, good Order, and Government, of the said City. (Repealed by Statute Law Revision Act 1948 (11 & 12 Geo. 6. c. 62))
Warwick Roads Act 1729 (repealed)	3 Geo. 2. c. 9	15 May 1730
An Act for repairing the Road leading from a Gate called Shipston Toll Gate, at Bridgtown, in the Parish of Old Stratford, in the County of Warwick, through Alderminster and Shipston upon Stower, to the Top of Long Compton Hill, in the said County. (Repealed by Old Stratford (Warwickshire) and Long Compton Hill Road Act 1818 (58 Geo. 3. c. xxxiv))
Middlesex and Hertford Roads Act 1729 (repealed)	3 Geo. 2. c. 10	15 May 1730
An Act for repairing the Road leading from Galley Corner, adjoining to Enfield Chase, in the Parish of South Mims, in the County of Middlesex, to Lemsford Mill, in the County of Hertford. (Repealed by Enfield Chase Road Act 1831 (1 Will. 4. c. lx))
Thames Navigation Act 1729 (repealed)	3 Geo. 2. c. 11	15 May 1730
An Act for reviving and amending an Act, made in the Sixth and Seventh Years of the Reign of His late Majesty King William the Third, intituled, "An Act to prevent Exactions of the Occupiers of Locks and Wears upon the River of Thames Westward, and for ascertaining the Rates of Water Carriage upon the said River." (Note: Thames Navigation Act 1694 (6 & 7 Will. & Mar. c. 16)) (Repealed by Thames and Isis Navigation Act 1750 (24 Geo. 2. c. 8))
Importation Act 1729 (repealed)	3 Geo. 2. c. 12	15 May 1730
An Act for importing Salt from Europe into the Colony of New York, in America. (Repealed by Statute Law Revision Act 1867 (30 & 31 Vict. c. 59))
Stroudwater Navigation Act 1729	3 Geo. 2. c. 13	15 May 1730
An Act for making navigable the River Stroudwater, in the County of Gloucester, from the River Severn, at or near Framiload, to Wallbridge, near the Town of Stroud, in the same County.
East India Company Act 1729 (repealed)	3 Geo. 2. c. 14	15 May 1730
An Act for reducing the Annuity or Fund of the United East India Company; and for ascertaining their Right of Trade to The East Indies, and the Continuance of their Corporation for that Purpose, upon the Terms therein mentioned. (Repealed by Statute Law Revision Act 1887 (50 & 51 Vict. c. 59))
Kent Roads Act 1729 (repealed)	3 Geo. 2. c. 15	15 May 1730
An Act for repairing and widening the Road from that Part of Chatham which lies next to the City of Rochester, to St. Dunstan's Cross, near the City of Canterbury, in the County of Kent; and for repealing so much of a former Act (Note: Kent Roads Act 1724 (11 Geo. 1. c. 5)) as appropriates Part of the Money arising by the Tolls or Duties therein mentioned towards repairing the Road between the Town of Chatham and Boughton under the Blean, in the said County of Kent. (Repealed by Chatham and Canterbury Road Act 1812 (52 Geo. 3. c. lxxxi))
National Debt Act 1729 (repealed)	3 Geo. 2. c. 16	15 May 1730
An Act for raising Five Hundred and Fifty Thousand Pounds, by Exchequer Bills, towards the Supply granted to His Majesty; and for the further Application of the Produce of the Sinking Fund; for applying the Arrears of former Land Taxes; for appropriating the Supplies granted in this Session of Parliament; and for giving Relief with respect to an Over-payment to the Land Tax, for the Year One Thousand Seven Hundred Twenty-one, by the Receiver General for the County of Salop. (Repealed by Statute Law Revision Act 1870 (33 & 34 Vict. c. 69))
Limehouse Parish Act 1729 (repealed)	3 Geo. 2. c. 17	15 May 1730
An Act for making the Hamlet of Limehouse, and Part of the Hamlet of Ratchiffe, in the Parish of St. Dunstan, Stebonheath, alias Stepney, in the County of Middlesex, a distinct Parish; and for providing a Maintenance for the Minister of the new Church there. (Repealed by London Government (Borough of Stepney) Order in Council 1901 (SR&O 1901/276))
Hereford Roads Act 1729 (repealed)	3 Geo. 2. c. 18	15 May 1730
An Act for repairing the several Roads leading into the City of Hereford. (Repealed by Hereford Roads Act 1810 (50 Geo. 3. c. lxxiii) (Note: Incorrectly cited as "50 Geo. 3. c. lxxii" in the Chronological Table of the Statutes.))
Bloomsbury Churches Act 1729	3 Geo. 2. c. 19	15 May 1730
An Act for providing a Maintenance for the Minister of the new Church near Bloomsbury Market, in the County of Middlesex; and for making more effectual an Act passed in the Fourth Year of His late Majesty's Reign, (Note: Saint Giles in the Fields Rebuilding Act 1717 (4 Geo. 1. c. 14)) for empowering the Commissioners for building the Fifty new Churches to direct the Parish Church of St. Giles in the Fields, in the said County, to be re-built, instead of One of the said Fifty new Churches.
Salt Duties Act 1729 (repealed)	3 Geo. 2. c. 20	15 May 1730
An Act for taking off certain Duties on Salt, and for making good any Deficiencies in the Funds that may happen thereby; and for charging the Reduced Annuity payable to the East India Company on the aggregate Fund; and for Relief of Mathew Lyon, Executor of Mathew Page deceased, in respect of the Duty for Salt lost by the overflowing of the River Mercy, in the Year One Thousand Seven Hundred Twenty-four. (Repealed by Statute Law Revision Act 1867 (30 & 31 Vict. c. 59))
Oxfordshire Roads Act 1729 (repealed)	3 Geo. 2. c. 21	15 May 1730
An Act for repairing and amending the several Roads leading from Woodstock, through Kiddington and Enston, to Roll Right Lane, and from Enslow Bridge to Kiddington aforesaid, in the County of Oxon. (Repealed by Woodstock and Rollright Lane Roads Act 1804 (44 Geo. 3. c. lxxix) and Woodstock and Rollright Lane Roads (Oxfordshire) Act 1825 (6 Geo. 4. c. xciv))
Brickmaking Act 1729 (repealed)	3 Geo. 2. c. 22	15 May 1730
An Act for amending the Acts therein mentioned, relating to the making of Bricks. (Repealed by Statute Law Revision Act 1867 (30 & 31 Vict. c. 59))
Worcester (Poor Relief, Burial Ground and Hopmarket) Act 1729	3 Geo. 2. c. 23	15 May 1730
An Act for amending and making more effectual an Act made in the Second and Third Years of the Reign of the late Queen Anne, intituled, "An Act for erecting a Workhouse in the City of Worcester, and for setting the Poor on Work there." (Note: Worcester (Poor Relief, Burial Ground and Hopmarket) Act 1703 (2 & 3 Ann. c. 8))
Cambridgeshire Roads Act 1729 (repealed)	3 Geo. 2. c. 24	15 May 1730
An Act for making a new Road, and for repairing and amending the ancient Road, between the Towns of Wisbech and March, in the Isle of Ely, in the County of Cambridge. (Repealed by Isle of Ely and Norfolk Roads Act 1766 (7 Geo. 3. c. 100) (Note: Incorrectly cited as "17 Geo. 3. c. 100" in the Chronological Table of the Statutes.))
Juries Act 1729 (repealed)	3 Geo. 2. c. 25	15 May 1730
An Act for the better Regulation of Juries. (Repealed by Juries Act 1825 (6 Geo. 4. c. 50))
Coal Trade Act 1729 (repealed)	3 Geo. 2. c. 26	15 May 1730
An Act for the better Regulation of the Coal Trade. (Repealed by Statute Law Revision Act 1867 (30 & 31 Vict. c. 59))
Insolvent Debtors Relief Act 1729 (repealed)	3 Geo. 2. c. 27	15 May 1730
An Act for explaining and amending an Act made in the last Session of Parliament, intituled, "An Act for the Relief of Debtors, with respect to the Imprisonment of their Persons." (Note: Insolvent Debtors Relief (No. 2) Act 1728 (2 Geo. 2. c. 22)) (Repealed by Statute Law Revision Act 1867 (30 & 31 Vict. c. 59))
Colonial Trade Act 1729 (repealed)	3 Geo. 2. c. 28	15 May 1730
An Act for granting Liberty to carry Rice from His Majesty's Province of Carolina, in America, directly to any Part of Europe Southward of Cape Finisterre, in Ships built in and belonging to Great Britain, and navigated according to Law. (Repealed by Statute Law Revision Act 1867 (30 & 31 Vict. c. 59))
Price of Bread, etc. Act 1729 (repealed)	3 Geo. 2. c. 29	15 May 1730
An Act for continuing and amending an Act (Note: Price and Assise of Bread Act 1709 (8 Ann. c. 19)) for regulating the Price and Assize of Bread; for Relief of Bankrupts, whose Certificates were not allowed before the Expiration of a late Act (Note: Bankrupts Act 1718 (5 Geo. 1. c. 24)) (for the better preventing Frauds committed by Bankrupts); for allowing further Time for Enrolment of Deeds or Wills made by Papists; and for Relief of Protestant Purchasers and Lessees; and for making further Provision concerning Certificates relating to the Settlements of poor Persons, and the Charges of maintaining and removing certificated Persons. (Repealed by Statute Law Revision Act 1867 (30 & 31 Vict. c. 59))
Orders, etc., of the Master of the Rolls Act 1729 (repealed)	3 Geo. 2. c. 30	15 May 1730
An Act to put an End to certain Disputes touching Orders and Decrees made in the Court of Chancery. (Repealed by Civil Procedure Acts Repeal Act 1879 (42 & 43 Vict. c. 59))
Brokers (Bristol) Act 1729 (repealed)	3 Geo. 2. c. 31	15 May 1730
An Act for the Admission and Regulation of Brokers within the City of Bristol. (Repealed by Statute Law (Repeals) Act 1977 (c. 18))
Execution of Sentences (Scotland) Act 1729 (repealed)	3 Geo. 2. c. 32	15 May 1730
An Act for enabling the Judges of the Court of Session in Scotland to make an Adjournment of the said Court; and for limiting the Time for the Execution of Sentences importing Corporal Punishments in that Part of the Kingdom. (Repealed by Statute Law Revision Act 1867 (30 & 31 Vict. c. 59) and Statute Law Revision Act 1948 (11 & 12 Geo. 6. c. 62))
Saint Nicholas, Deptford (Parish) Act 1729 (repealed)	3 Geo. 2. c. 33	15 May 1730
An Act for providing a Maintenance for the Minister of the new Parish Church of St. Nicholas, Deptford, in the Counties of Kent and Surry; and for making the same a distinct Parish. (Repealed by London Government (Borough of Deptford) Order in Council 1901 (SR&O 1901/214) and London Government (Borough of Greenwich) Order in Council 1901 (SR&O 1901/267))
Bridgwater Roads Act 1729	3 Geo. 2. c. 34	15 May 1730
An Act for repairing several Roads leading into the Town of Bridgewater, in the County of Somerset.
River Kennet Navigation Act 1729	3 Geo. 2. c. 35	15 May 1730
An Act for making the Acts of the First (Note: Kennet Navigation Act 1715 (1 Geo. 1. St. 2. c. 24)) and Seventh (Note: River Kennet Navigation Act 1720 (7 Geo. 1. St. 1. c. 8)) Years of His late Majesty's Reign, for making the River Kennet navigable, from Reading, to Newbury, in the County of Berks, more effectual.
Skerries Lighthouse Act 1729 (repealed)	3 Geo. 2. c. 36	15 May 1730
An Act for confirming a Patent, granted by Her late Majesty Queen Anne, to William Trench Esquire, deceased, for erecting a Lighthouse upon the Island or Rock called Skerries, and for the better Maintenance of the said Lighthouse; and for making the Duties granted for maintaining the same perpetual. (Repealed by Statute Law Revision Act 1867 (30 & 31 Vict. c. 59))
Cambridge Roads Act 1729 (repealed)	3 Geo. 2. c. 37	15 May 1730
An Act to explain, amend, and render more effectual, an Act made in the Tenth Year of His late Majesty's Reign, intituled, "An Act for repairing the Roads leading from Stump Cross, in the Parish of Chesterford, in the County of Essex, to Newmarket-heath, and the Town of Cambridge in the County of Cambridge;" (Note: Cambridge Roads Act 1723 (10 Geo. 1. c. 12)) and also an Act made in the Eleventh Year of His said late Majesty's Reign, intituled, "An Act for repairing Part of the Road from London to Cambridge, beginning at the End of the Parish of Foulmire, in the said County, next to Barley, in the County of Hertford, and ending at the Pavement in Trumpington-street, in the Town of Cambridge." (Note: Cambridge Roads Act 1724 (11 Geo. 1. c. 14)) (Repealed by Cambridge Roads Act 1790 (30 Geo. 3. c. 94))

=== Private acts ===
Short title	Citation	Royal assent
Long title
Naturalization of Paul Torras and Others Act 1729	3 Geo. 2. c. 1 Pr.	20 February 1730
An Act for naturalizing Paul Torras and others.
Broyel's Naturalization Act 1729	3 Geo. 2. c. 2 Pr.	20 February 1730
An Act for naturalizing Herman Broyel.
Claughton Inclosure Act 1729	3 Geo. 2. c. 3 Pr.	24 March 1730
An Act to enclose divers Commons and Parcels of Waste Grounds, lying and being in the Township of Claughton, in the Parish of Garstang, and County Palatine of Lancaster.
Lillington Inclosure Act 1729	3 Geo. 2. c. 4 Pr.	24 March 1730
An Act for enclosing several Common Fields, Common Meadows, and other Commonable Lands, in the Parish of Lillington, in the County of Warwick.
Mixbury Inclosure Act 1729	3 Geo. 2. c. 5 Pr.	24 March 1730
An Act to confirm an Agreement for enclosing the Common Fields, Downs, Waste, and Unenclosed Lands, Part of the Manor of Mixbury, in the County of Oxon; and for other Purposes therein mentioned.
East Wellow Inclosure Act 1729	3 Geo. 2. c. 6 Pr.	24 March 1730
An Act for enclosing Part of the Waste, or Common, called East Wellow Common, belonging to the Manor and Tithing of East Wellow, in the County of Southampton; and for vesting a certain Annual Rent Charge in Trustees, for the Benefit of the Poor of the Tithing of East Wellow aforesaid for ever.
Horninghold Inclosure Act 1729	3 Geo. 2. c. 7 Pr.	24 March 1730
An Act for enclosing and dividing the Common Fields and Common Grounds, in the Parish of Horninghold, in the County of Leicester.
Vesting manor of Oakley and other lands in Buckinghamshire in trust for Charles Lord Cadogan and settling others in Oxfordshire and Berkshire of equal value to the same uses.	3 Geo. 2. c. 8 Pr.	24 March 1730
An Act for vesting the Manor of Okeley, and other Lands, in the County of Bucks, in Trust, for Charles Lord Cadogan and his Heirs; and for settling other Lands, of equal Value, in the Counties of Oxon and Berks, to the same Uses, in Lieu thereof.
Naturalization of Nicholas Lewis Well and Others Act 1729	3 Geo. 2. c. 9 Pr.	24 March 1730
An Act for naturalizing Nicholas Lewis Well and others.
Duke and Duchess of Beaufort's Name and Lord Scudamore's Estate Act 1729	3 Geo. 2. c. 10 Pr.	15 May 1730
An Act for obliging Henry Duke of Beaufort. and Frances Dutchess of Beaufort and her Children, to take the additional Surname, and bear the Arms, of Scudamore, pursuant to a Settlement made by James late Lord Scudamore in the Kingdom of Ireland; and for vesting in the said Duke, in Fee, the Manors of Wickball and Ditton Camois, and Lands in the County of Cambridge, late the Estate of the said Lord Scudamore, in Lieu of the Portion provided by him for his Daughter the said Dutchess; and for other Purposes therein mentioned.
Cavendish's Estate Act 1729	3 Geo. 2. c. 11 Pr.	15 May 1730
An Act for vesting the Manor of Claxby, and divers Lands and Hereditaments in the County of Lincoln, the Estate of the Honourable James Cavendish Esquire, in Trustees, to be sold, for discharging Four Thousand Two Hundred Pounds, secured upon those and other Lands.
Earl of Ranelagh's Estate Act 1729	3 Geo. 2. c. 12 Pr.	15 May 1730
An Act for vesting the Estate of Richard late Earl of Ranelagh, in the Kingdom of Ireland, lying in the Counties of Middlesex and Berks, in Trustees, to be sold, for the Uses therein mentioned.
Welsbourne Mountfort Inclosure Act 1729	3 Geo. 2. c. 13 Pr.	15 May 1730
An Act for enclosing several Common Fields, Common Meadows, and other Commonable Lands, in the Hamlet of Welsbourne Mountfort, in the Parish of Welsbourne Hastings, in the County of Warwick.
Sale of manor of Hickling and other lands in Nottinghamshire entailed by the will of Margaret, Dowager Duchess of Newcastle, and purchase and settlement of another estate from the proceeds.	3 Geo. 2. c. 14 Pr.	15 May 1730
An Act for Sale of the Manor of Hickling, and other Lands and Hereditaments, in the County of Nottingham, late the Estate of Margaret Dutchess Dowager of Newcastle, and entailed by her Will; and for laying out the Money arising by such Sale in the Purchase of another Estate, to be settled to the same Uses.
Mordaunt's Estate Act 1729	3 Geo. 2. c. 15 Pr.	15 May 1730
An Act for enlarging the Power of Sir Charles Mordaunt Baronet, to make a Jointure.
Lumley's Estate Act 1729	3 Geo. 2. c. 16 Pr.	15 May 1730
An Act for vesting the Estate of Sir James Lumley Baronet in Trustees, for raising Monies, by Sale or Mortgage thereof, for the Payment of his Debts.
Dodwell's Estate Act 1729	3 Geo. 2. c. 17 Pr.	15 May 1730
An Act to enable Trustees to make Leases of the Estate late of Sir William Dodwell Knight, deceased, during the Infancy of Mary Dodwell, his only Child; and for other Purposes therein mentioned.
Breton's Estate Act 1729	3 Geo. 2. c. 18 Pr.	15 May 1730
An Act for repealing Part of an Act, passed in the Thirteenth Year of the Reign of His late Majesty King George the First, intituled, "An Act for vesting Part of the Estate of Moyle Breton Esquire in Trustees, to be sold, for the raising Three Thousand Pounds charged on other Part of the same Estate; and for other Purposes therein mentioned;" (Note: Breton's Estate Act 1726 (13 Geo. 1. c. 15 Pr.)) and for appointing other Lands to be sold than by the said Act are directed.
Satisfatt's Estate Act 1729	3 Geo. 2. c. 19 Pr.	15 May 1730
An Act for confirming a Conveyance and Surrenders of certain Freehold and Copyhold Lands and Hereditaments, by Roger Satisfatt and Jemima Satisfatt, both Infants, unto Edward Lord Bishop of Coventry and Litchfield.
Restraining Thomas Jervoise from marrying, aliening, disposing of or incumbering his estate during his lunacy and for raising portions for his sister's children.	3 Geo. 2. c. 20 Pr.	15 May 1730
An Act for restraining Thomas Jervoise Junior, Esquire, a Lunatic, from marrying, or aliening, disposing, or encumbering his Estate, during his Lunacy; and for raising Portions for his Sister's Children; and for other Purposes therein mentioned.
Relief of Dame Elizabeth Dudley in relation to an estate in Ireland, forfeited to the Crown, during the lifetime of William Kennedy, her great uncle.	3 Geo. 2. c. 21 Pr.	15 May 1730
An Act for Relief of Dame Elizabeth Dudley, relating to an Estate in the Kingdom of Ireland, forfeited to the Crown during the Life of William Kennedy her Great Uncle.

=== Sources ===
- Pickering, Danby, ed. (1765). "Anno tertio Georgii II". The Statutes at Large. Vol. 16: From the Second to the 9th Year of King George II. Cambridge: Joseph Bentham. pp. 115–203 – via Internet Archive.
- Pickering, Danby, ed. (1765). "Anno tertio Georgii II". The Statutes at Large. Vol. 16: From the Second to the 9th Year of King George II. Cambridge: Joseph Bentham. pp. 115–203 – via Google Books.
- Journals of the House of Commons. Vol. 21. London: His Majesty's Stationery Office. 1803. pp. 391–589 – via Google Books.
- Chronological Table of and Index to the Statutes. Vol. 1: To the End of the Session 59 Vict. Sess. 2 (1895) (13th ed.). London: Her Majesty's Stationery Office. 1896. p. 100 – via Google Books.

== See also ==
- List of acts of the Parliament of Great Britain
