= List of acts of the Parliament of Great Britain from 1718 =

This is a complete list of acts of the Parliament of Great Britain for the year 1718.

For acts passed until 1707, see the list of acts of the Parliament of England and the list of acts of the Parliament of Scotland. See also the list of acts of the Parliament of Ireland.

For acts passed from 1801 onwards, see the list of acts of the Parliament of the United Kingdom. For acts of the devolved parliaments and assemblies in the United Kingdom, see the list of acts of the Scottish Parliament, the list of acts of the Northern Ireland Assembly, and the list of acts and measures of Senedd Cymru; see also the list of acts of the Parliament of Northern Ireland.

The number shown after each act's title is its chapter number. Acts are cited using this number, preceded by the year(s) of the reign during which the relevant parliamentary session was held; thus the Union with Ireland Act 1800 is cited as "39 & 40 Geo. 3. c. 67", meaning the 67th act passed during the session that started in the 39th year of the reign of George III and which finished in the 40th year of that reign. Note that the modern convention is to use Arabic numerals in citations (thus "41 Geo. 3" rather than "41 Geo. III"). Acts of the last session of the Parliament of Great Britain and the first session of the Parliament of the United Kingdom are both cited as "41 Geo. 3".

Acts passed by the Parliament of Great Britain did not have a short title; however, some of these acts have subsequently been given a short title by acts of the Parliament of the United Kingdom (such as the Short Titles Act 1896).

Before the Acts of Parliament (Commencement) Act 1793 came into force on 8 April 1793, acts passed by the Parliament of Great Britain were deemed to have come into effect on the first day of the session in which they were passed. Because of this, the years given in the list below may in fact be the year before a particular act was passed.

== 5 Geo. 1 ==
The fourth session of the 5th Parliament of Great Britain, which met from 11 November 1718 until 18 April 1719.

This session was also traditionally cited as 5 G. 1.

=== Public acts ===
Short title	Citation	Royal assent
Long title
Land Tax Act 1718 (repealed)	5 Geo. 1. c. 1	12 December 1718
An Act for granting to His Majesty an Aid by a Land Tax, to be raised in Great Britain, for the Service of the Year One Thousand Seven Hundred and Nineteen. (Repealed by Statute Law Revision Act 1867 (30 & 31 Vict. c. 59))
Taxation, etc. Act 1718 (repealed)	5 Geo. 1. c. 2	12 December 1718
An Act for continuing the Duties on Malt, Mum, Cyder, and Perry, for the Service of the Year One Thousand Seven Hundred and Nineteen; and for enlarging the Time for entering at the Exchequer such Assignments of Reversionary Annuities as are therein mentioned; and for better securing the Duties on Hides and Skins, Vellum and Parchment. (Repealed by Statute Law Revision Act 1867 (30 & 31 Vict. c. 59))
National Debt Act 1718 (repealed)	5 Geo. 1. c. 3	18 February 1719
An Act for applying certain Overplus Monies and further Sums, to be raised as well by Way of a Lottery as by Loans, towards paying off and canceling Exchequer Bills; and for lessening the present great Charge in relation to those Bills; and for circulating and exchanging for ready Money the Residue of the same Bills for the future. (Repealed by Statute Law Revision Act 1870 (33 & 34 Vict. c. 69))
Religious Worship Act 1718 (repealed)	5 Geo. 1. c. 4	18 February 1719
An Act for strengthening the Protestant Interest in these Kingdoms. (Repealed by Statute Law Revision Act 1871 (34 & 35 Vict. c. 116))
Mutiny Act 1718 (repealed)	5 Geo. 1. c. 5	18 February 1719
An Act for punishing Mutiny and Desertion; and for the better Payment of the Army and their Quarters (Repealed by Statute Law Revision Act 1867 (30 & 31 Vict. c. 59))
Corporations Act 1718 (repealed)	5 Geo. 1. c. 6	18 February 1719
An Act for quieting and establishing Corporations. (Repealed by Statute Law Revision Act 1867 (30 & 31 Vict. c. 59))
Tobacco Trade Act 1718 (repealed)	5 Geo. 1. c. 7	18 February 1719
An Act for continuing an Act made in the Twelfth Year of the Reign of Her late Majesty Queen Anne, (Note: Tobacco Trade Act 1713 (13 Ann. c. 8)) for encouraging the Tobacco Trade. (Repealed by Statute Law Revision Act 1867 (30 & 31 Vict. c. 59))
Poor Relief (Deserted Wives and Children) Act 1718 (repealed)	5 Geo. 1. c. 8	18 February 1719
An Act for the more effectual Relief of such Wives and Children as are left by their Husbands and Parents upon the Charge of the Parish. (Repealed by National Assistance Act 1948 (11 & 12 Geo. 6. c. 29))
National Debt (No. 2) Act 1718 (repealed)	5 Geo. 1. c. 9	10 March 1719
An Act for continuing certain Duties upon Coals and Culm; and for establishing certain Funds, to raise Money, as well to proceed in the building of new Churches, as also to compleat the Supply granted to His Majesty; and to reserve the Overplus Monies of the said Duties for the Disposition of Parliament; and for more effectual suppressing private Lotteries. (Repealed by Statute Law Revision Act 1870 (33 & 34 Vict. c. 69))
Bridlington Piers Act 1718 (repealed)	5 Geo. 1. c. 10	10 March 1719
An Act for enlarging the Time granted by Two Acts of Parliament, (Note: Bridlington Piers Act 1696 (8 & 9 Will. 3. c. 29)) (Note: Bridlington Pier Act 1715 (1 Geo. 1. St. 2. c. 49)) for Repairs of the Piers of Bridlington, alias Burlington; and for making the said Acts more effectual. (Repealed by Bridlington Piers and Harbour Act 1837 (7 Will. 4 & 1 Vict. c. cx))
Adulteration of Coffee Act 1718 (repealed)	5 Geo. 1. c. 11	18 April 1719
An Act against clandestine Running of uncustomed Goods; and for the more effectual preventing of Frauds relating to the Customs. (Repealed for England and Wales by Food and Drugs Act 1938 (1 & 2 Geo. 6. c. 56) and for Scotland by Statute Law Revision Act 1958 (6 & 7 Eliz. 2. c. 46))
Highways Act 1718 (repealed)	5 Geo. 1. c. 12	18 April 1719
An Act for making more effectual the several Acts passed for repairing and amending the Highways of this Kingdom. (Repealed by Highways (No. 2) Act 1766 (7 Geo. 3. c. 42))
Writs of Error Act 1718 (repealed)	5 Geo. 1. c. 13	18 April 1719
An Act for the Amendment of Writs of Error, and for the further preventing the arresting or reversing of Judgements after Verdict. (Repealed by Statute Law Revision and Civil Procedure Act 1883 (46 & 47 Vict. c. 49))
Debts Due to the Army, etc. Act 1718 (repealed)	5 Geo. 1. c. 14	18 April 1719
An Act to continue the Commissioners, appointed to examine, state, and determine, the Debts due to the Army; and to examine and state the Demands of several Foreign Princes and States, for Subsidies during the late War. (Repealed by Statute Law Revision Act 1867 (30 & 31 Vict. c. 59))
Deer Stealers Act 1718 (repealed)	5 Geo. 1. c. 15	18 April 1719
An Act for making more effectual an Act of the Third and Fourth Years of the Reign of King William and Queen Mary, intituled, "An Act for the more effectual Discovery and Punishment of Deer Stealers." (Note: Deer Stealers Act 1691 (3 Will. & Mar. c. 10)) (Repealed by Stealing of Deer Act 1776 (16 Geo. 3. c. 30))
Dunbar Beer Duties Act 1718 (repealed)	5 Geo. 1. c. 16	18 April 1719
An Act for laying a Duty of Two Pennies Scotts, or One Sixth Part of a Penny Sterling, upon every Pint of Ale or Beer that shall be vended or sold within the Town of Dunbar, for improving and preserving the Harbour, and repairing the Town House, and building a School, and other Public Buildings there, and for supplying the said Town with fresh Water. (Repealed by Statute Law Revision Act 1948 (11 & 12 Geo. 6. c. 62))
Inverness Beer Duties Act 1718 (repealed)	5 Geo. 1. c. 17	18 April 1719
An Act for laying a Duty of Two Pennies Scotts, or One Sixth Part of a Penny Sterling, upon every Pint of Ale or Beer that shall be vended or sold within the Town of Inverness, and Privileges thereof, for paying the Debts of the said Town; and for building a Church, and making a Harbour there. (Repealed by Statute Law Revision Act 1948 (11 & 12 Geo. 6. c. 62))
Salt Duties Act 1718 (repealed)	5 Geo. 1. c. 18	18 April 1719
An Act for recovering the Credit of the British Fishery in Foreign Parts; and for better securing the Duties on Salt. (Repealed by Statute Law Revision Act 1867 (30 & 31 Vict. c. 59))
National Debt (No. 3) Act 1718 (repealed)	5 Geo. 1. c. 19	18 April 1719
An Act for redeeming the Fund appropriated for Payment of the Lottery Tickets which were made forth for the Service of the Year One Thousand Seven Hundred and Ten, by a voluntary Subscription of the Proprietors into the Capital Stock of the South Sea Company; and for raising a Sum of Money, to pay off such Debts and Incumbrances as are therein mentioned; and for appropriating the Supplies granted in this Session of Parliament; and to limit Times for Prosecutions upon Bonds for exporting Cards and Dice. (Repealed by Statute Law Revision Act 1870 (33 & 34 Vict. c. 69))
Revenue of Scotland Act 1718 (repealed)	5 Geo. 1. c. 20	18 April 1719
An Act for settling certain Yearly Funds, payable out of the Revenue of Scotland, to satisfy Public Debts in Scotland, and other Uses mentioned in the Treaty of Union; and to discharge the Equivalents claimed on Behalf of Scotland in the Terms of the same Treaty; and for obviating all future Disputes, Charges, and Expences, concerning those Equivalents. (Repealed by Statute Law (Repeals) Act 1986 (c. 12))
Trade to the East Indies Act 1718 (repealed)	5 Geo. 1. c. 21	18 April 1719
An Act for the better securing the lawful Trade of His Majesty's Subjects to and from The East Indies; and for the more effectual preventing all His Majesty's Subjects trading thither under Foreign Commissions. (Repealed by East India Company Act 1793 (33 Geo. 3. c. 52))
Crown Lands (Forfeited Estates) Act 1718 (repealed)	5 Geo. 1. c. 22	18 April 1719
An Act for enlarging the Time to determine Claims on the forfeited Estates. (Repealed by Statute Law Revision Act 1948 (11 & 12 Geo. 6. c. 62))
Forfeited Estates, etc. Act 1718 (repealed)	5 Geo. 1. c. 23	18 April 1719
An Act for appointing a Commissioner and Trustee, to put in Execution the Powers and Authorities of the several Acts of Parliament relating to the forfeited Estates, and Estates given to Superstitious Uses, in the room of George Treby Esquire, who has desired to be discharged from the said Trusts. (Repealed by Statute Law Revision Act 1867 (30 & 31 Vict. c. 59))
Bankrupts Act 1718 (repealed)	5 Geo. 1. c. 24	18 April 1719
An Act for the better preventing Frauds committed by Bankrupts. (Repealed by Statute Law Revision Act 1867 (30 & 31 Vict. c. 59))
Continuance of Laws Act 1718 (repealed)	5 Geo. 1. c. 25	18 April 1719
An Act for continuing the Act made in the Eighth Year of the Reign of the late Queen Anne, (Note: Price and Assise of Bread Act 1709 (8 Ann. c. 19)) to regulate the Price and Assize of Bread; and for continuing the Act made in the Twelfth Year of Her said late Majesty's Reign, (Note: Sail Cloth Manufacture Act 1712 (12 Ann. c. 12)) for the better Encouragement of the making Sail Cloth in Great Britain. (Repealed by Statute Law Revision Act 1867 (30 & 31 Vict. c. 59))
Keeping of Gunpowder Act 1718 (repealed)	5 Geo. 1. c. 26	18 April 1719
An Act for preventing the Mischiefs which may happen by keeping too great Quantities of Gunpowder in or near the Cities of London and Westminster, or the Suburbs thereof. (Repealed by Keeping, etc., of Gunpowder Act 1771 (11 Geo. 3. c. 35))
Artificers Act 1718 (repealed)	5 Geo. 1. c. 27	18 April 1719
An Act to prevent the Inconveniencies arising from seducing Artificers in the Manufactures of Great Britain into Foreign Parts. (Repealed by Artificers Going Abroad Act 1824 (5 Geo. 4. c. 97))
Destruction of Deer (England) Act 1718 (repealed)	5 Geo. 1. c. 28	18 April 1719
An Act for the further Punishment of such Persons as shall unlawfully kill or destroy Deer, in Parks, Paddocks, or other enclosed Grounds. (Repealed for England and Wales by Criminal Statutes Repeal Act 1827 (7 & 8 Geo. 4. c. 27) and for India by Criminal Law (India) Act 1828 (9 Geo. 4. c. 74))
Church Patronage (Scotland) Act 1718 (repealed)	5 Geo. 1. c. 29	18 April 1719
An Act for making more effectual the Laws appointing the Oaths for Security of the Government to be taken by Ministers and Preachers in Churches and Meeting-houses in Scotland. (Repealed by Statute Law (Repeals) Act 1974 (c. 22))
Highway (Scotland) Act 1718 (repealed)	5 Geo. 1. c. 30	18 April 1719
An Act for amending and making more effectual the Laws for repairing the Highways, Bridges, and Ferries, in that Part of Great Britain called Scotland. (Repealed by Turnpike Roads (Scotland) Act 1831 (1 & 2 Will. 4. c. 43) and Statute Law Revision Act 1948 (11 & 12 Geo. 6. c. 62))
Colne River, Essex Navigation Act 1718 (repealed)	5 Geo. 1. c. 31	18 April 1719
An Act for enlarging the Time granted by an Act of the Ninth and Tenth Years of King William, (Note: Navigation (Colchester to Wivenhoe) Act 1697 (9 Will. 3 c. 19)) for cleansing and making navigable the Channel from The Hythe at Colchester to Wivenhoe; and for making the said Act more effectual. (Repealed by Colchester and Wivenhoe Navigation and Colchester Improvement Act 1811 (51 Geo. 3. c. xliii))
Relief of Sufferers, West Indies Act 1718 (repealed)	5 Geo. 1. c. 32	18 April 1719
An Act for Relief of such Sufferers of the Islands of Nevis and Saint Christopher's, as have settled in either of those Islands, and made due Proof of such Settlement, before the Twenty-fifth Day of December One Thousand Seven Hundred and Twelve. (Repealed by Statute Law Revision Act 1867 (30 & 31 Vict. c. 59))

=== Private acts ===
Short title	Citation	Royal assent
Long title
Stokenchurch and New Woodstock Road Act 1718 (repealed)	5 Geo. 1. c. 1 Pr.	18 February 1719
An Act for repairing the Roads from the Top of Stoken Church Hill (Note: Stokenchurch, Oxfordshire.) to Enslow Bridge; (Note: Enslow Bridge, where the A4095 road crosses the River Cherwell, west of Enslow, Oxfordshire. 51°51′45″N 1°18′28″W) and the Road leading from Wheatly Bridge, (Note: Wheatley Bridge, where the London Road (former A40) crosses the River Thame east of Wheatley, Oxfordshire. 51°44′32″N 1°06′54″W) through the City of Oxon, by Begbrooke, to New Woodstock, in the County of Oxon (except the Mill-way on each Side the said City); and to disable all Commissioners or Trustees, appointed for repairing of any Highways or Roads, to have any Place of Profit arising out of the Toll for repairing such Highways or Roads. (Repealed by Stokenchurch and New Woodstock Road Act 1778 (18 Geo. 3. c. 91))
Beaconsfield and Stokenchurch Road Act 1718 (repealed)	5 Geo. 1. c. 2 Pr.	18 February 1719
An Act for repairing the Roads from Beconsfield, in the County of Bucks, to Stoken Church, in the County of Oxon. (Repealed by Beaconsfield and Stokenchurch Road Act 1823 (4 Geo. 4. c. cviii))
Making more effectual agreements made between Thomas Holles, Duke of Newcastle, Henry Pelham, Lord Harley and Lady Henrietta his wife and William and Gilbert Vane in relation to the will and estate of John late Duke of Newcastle and settling the same according to such agreements, and other provisions.	5 Geo. 1. c. 3 Pr.	18 February 1719
An Act to render more effectual the Agreements that have been made, between Thomas Holles Duke of Newcastle, Henry Pelham Esquire, Edward Lord Harley and the Lady Henrietta his Wife, William Vane and Gilbert Vane Esquires, Sons of Christopher Lord Bernard, or any of them, in relation to the Will and Estate of John late Duke of Newcastle; and for settling the same in such Manner as may be agreeable to the Intent of the said Agreements; and for other Purposes therein mentioned.
Vesting fee and inheritance of Halifax House in St. James's Square (Westminster) and castle and manor of Fotheringhay (Northamptonshire) in trustees to be sold, together with a term of 500 years, devised by William Marquis of Halifax, to his executors, in trust, for better performance of his will.	5 Geo. 1. c. 4 Pr.	18 February 1719
An Act to vest the Fee and Inheritance of the Capital Messuage called Halifax House, in St. James's Square, in the Parish of St. James's, Westminster, and the Castle and Manor of Fotheringhay, in the County of Northampton, in Trustees, to be sold, together with a Term of Five Hundred Years, devised by William late Lord Marquis of Halifax, to his Executors, in Trust, for the better Performance of his Will.
Relief of Sir Nicholas Tempest relating to an estate demised to him by William, late Lord Widdrington and Lady Jane, his wife, many years before Lord Widdrington's attainder.	5 Geo. 1. c. 5 Pr.	18 February 1719
An Act for Relief of Sir Nicholas Tempest Baronet, touching an Estate demised to him by William late Lord Widdrington and Lady Jane his late Wife, many Years before the Attainder of the said late Lord Widdrington.
Glanville's Name Act 1718	5 Geo. 1. c. 6 Pr.	18 February 1719
An Act to enable William Glanvill Esquire to take upon him the Surname of Glanvill instead of his Surname of Evelyn, pursuant to the Will of William Glanvill Esquire, deceased.
Enabling William Pulteney and those in remainder to lease houses and grounds therein mentioned and to rectify mistakes in two leases from King Charles II to Sir William Pulteney and King William III to John Pulteney.	5 Geo. 1. c. 7 Pr.	18 February 1719
An Act to enable William Pulteney Esquire, and the Persons in Remainder after him, to make Leases of the Houses and Ground therein mentioned; and to rectify some Mistakes in Two Leases, from King Charles the Second to Sir William Pulteney, and from King William the Third to John Pulteney Esquire.
Jett's Estate Act 1718	5 Geo. 1. c. 8 Pr.	18 February 1719
An Act for vesting certain Lands and Tenements, in the County of Somerset, the Estate of Thomas Jett Esquire, in Trustees, to be sold; and, with the Monies arising thereby, to purchase other Lands, of the like Value, to be settled to the same Uses.
Vesting in John Porrett and heirs part of the estate of Thomas Davidson at Stranton, Seaton, Carew and Thorp Thewles (Durham) free from uses and trusts of Davidson's marriage settlement and settling other lands of better value to the same uses.	5 Geo. 1. c. 9 Pr.	18 February 1719
An Act for vesting in John Porrett and his Heirs Part of the Estate of Thomas Davison Esquire, at Stranton, Seaton Carew, and Thorp Thewles, in the County of Durham, freed from the Uses and Trusts of the said Thomas Davison's Marriage Settlement; and to settle other Lands, of better Value, to the same Uses.
Earl of Westmorland's Estate Act 1718	5 Geo. 1. c. 10 Pr.	10 March 1719
An Act for Sale of several Manors, Lands, Tenements, and Hereditaments, of the Right Honourable Thomas Earl of Westmorland, in the County of Kent; and, with the Monies arising by such Sale, to purchase other Lands, in or near the County of Northampton, to be settled to the same Uses.
Phelips' Estate Act 1718	5 Geo. 1. c. 11 Pr.	10 March 1719
An Act for vesting the Estate late of Francis Phelips Esquire, in Barking, in the County of Essex, in Trustees, to be sold, for the Purposes therein mentioned.
Willoughby's Estate Act 1718	5 Geo. 1. c. 12 Pr.	10 March 1719
An Act to enable Thomas Willoughby Esquire, and the Persons in Remainder after him, to make a Jointure.
Enabling Katherine Paul to transfer certain trusts as if she were twenty-one years of age.	5 Geo. 1. c. 13 Pr.	10 March 1719
An Act to enable Katherine Paul, an Infant, to transfer the Trust therein mentioned, as if she were of the Age of One and Twenty Years.
Confirmation of an agreement between the City of London Corporation, as Governors of the hospitals of Edward King of England the sixth, of Christ, Bridewell and St. Thomas the Apostle, and the Governors of the schools founded by Erasmus Smith.	5 Geo. 1. c. 14 Pr.	10 March 1719
An Act for confirming an Agreement between the Mayor and Commonalty and Citizens of the City of London, Governors of the Possessions, Revenues, and Goods, of the Hospitals of Edward King of England the Sixth, of Christ, Bridewell, and St. Thomas the Apostle, and the Governors of the Schools founded by Erasmus Smith Esquire.
Barnwell's Estate Act 1718	5 Geo. 1. c. 15 Pr.	10 March 1719
An Act for Sale of Part of the Estate of Robert Barwell Esquire; and for purchasing other Lands, to be settled to the same Uses as the Estate to be sold is settled.
Long's Estate Act 1718	5 Geo. 1. c. 16 Pr.	10 March 1719
An Act for Sale of the Estate of Nathaniel Long, late of London, Merchant, deceased, for Payment of his Debts; and for applying the Residue according to the Directions of his Will.
Naturalization of Peter Sejourne, Samuel Dufresmay and Peter Lucas.	5 Geo. 1. c. 17 Pr.	10 March 1719
An Act to naturalize Peter Sejourne, Samuel Dufresnay, and Peter Lucas.
Sprogell's Naturalization Act 1817	5 Geo. 1. c. 18 Pr.	10 March 1719
An Act for naturalizing Lodowick Christian Sprogell.
Sunderland Parish Act 1719	5 Geo. 1. c. 19 Pr.	18 April 1719
An Act for making the Town and Township of Sunderland a distinct Parish from the Parish of Bishop Wearmouth, in the County of Durham.
Duke of Wharton's Estate Act 1718	5 Geo. 1. c. 20 Pr.	18 April 1719
An Act for vesting the Manors of Aske Catteron, and other Lands in the County of York, and County of the City of York, Part of the Estate of Philip Duke of Wharton, in Trustees, to be sold or mortgaged, for the Purposes therein mentioned.
Enabling the Treasury to compound with Jasper Cullum for debts he stands engaged for to the Crown on account of Richard Lee, Thomas Corbin, Heneage Robinson and John Fox for duties on tobacco.	5 Geo. 1. c. 21 Pr.	18 April 1719
An Act to enable the Lords Commissioners of the Treasury, or Lord High Treasurer, for the Time being, to compound with Jasper Cullum, for the Debts he stands engaged for to the Crown, on Account of Richard Lee, Thomas Corbin, Heneage Robinson, and John Fox, for Duties on Tobacco.
Enabling the Treasury to compound with Robert Wemes for the debt due from him to His Majesty in relation to the duties on salt.	5 Geo. 1. c. 22 Pr.	18 April 1719
An Act to enable the Lords Commissioners of the Treasury, or Lord High Treasurer, for the Time being, to compound with Robert Weemes, for the Debt due from him to His Majesty, in relation to the Duties on Salt.
Enabling Robert and Mary Packer, Winchcombe Howard Packer, Henrietta Winchcombe, Thomas Skerret and Dame Elizabeth Winchcombe to enter claims before Commissioners and trustees concerning claims upon forfeited estates and to empower the Commissioners and trustees to hear and determine them.	5 Geo. 1. c. 23 Pr.	18 April 1719
An Act to enable Robert Packer Esquire and Mary his Wife, Winchcombe Howard Packer (their Son, a Minor), Henrietta Winchcombe, and Thomas Skerret Esquire and Dame Elizabeth Winchcombe his Wife, to enter their respective Claims before the Commissioners and Trustees for determining Claims upon the forfeited Estates; and to empower the said Commissioners and Trustees to hear and determine the said Claims.
Relief of Edward Clent, executor of Lieutenant Colonel Thomas Clent, for an army debenture lost in the pay office.	5 Geo. 1. c. 24 Pr.	18 April 1719
An Act for the Relief of Edward Clent Esquire, Executor of Lieutenant Colonel Thomas Clent, for an Army Debenture lost in The Pay-office.
Naturalization of Peter Lamy de Hame and Charlotte Whetstone.	5 Geo. 1. c. 25 Pr.	18 April 1719
An Act to naturalize Peter Lamy de Hame and Charlotte Whetstone.

=== Sources ===
- Pickering, Danby, ed. (1765). "Anno quinto Georgii I". The Statutes at Large. Vol. 14: From the Fifth to the Ninth Year of King George I. Cambridge: Joseph Bentham. pp. 1–127 – via Internet Archive.
- Pickering, Danby, ed. (1765). "Anno quinto Georgii I". The Statutes at Large. Vol. 14: From the Fifth to the Ninth Year of King George I. Cambridge: Joseph Bentham. pp. 1–127 – via Google Books.
- Pickering, Danby, ed. (1765). "Anno quinto Georgii I". The Statutes at Large. Vol. 14: From the Fifth to the Ninth Year of King George I. Cambridge: Joseph Bentham. pp. 1–127 – via Internet Archive.
- Journals of the House of Commons. Vol. 19. London: His Majesty's Stationery Office. 1803. pp. 3–164 – via Google Books.
- Chronological Table of and Index to the Statutes. Vol. 1: To the End of the Session 59 Vict. Sess. 2 (1895) (13th ed.). London: Her Majesty's Stationery Office. 1896. p. 94-95 – via Google Books.

== See also ==
- List of acts of the Parliament of Great Britain
