= Select Committee on Temporary Laws, Expired or Expiring =

United Kingdom House of Commons select committee

- Formation: April 12, 1796
- Dissolved: May 12, 1796
- Chair: Charles Abbot MP
- Key people: See § membership
- Parent organization: House of Commons
- Website: Report

The Select Committee on Temporary Laws, Expired or Expiring was a select committee of the House of Commons of the Parliament of Great Britain appointed in 1796 to inspect and consider all the temporary laws of a public nature, which were expired or expiring.

== Background ==
In the United Kingdom, acts of Parliament remain in force until expressly repealed. Blackstone's Commentaries on the Laws of England, published in the late 18th-century, raised questions about the system and structure of the common law and the poor drafting and disorder of the existing statute book.

== Establishment ==
On 12 April 1796, the House of Commons resolved to appoint a select committee to "inspect and consider all the Temporary Laws whatever of a Public Nature, which are expired, or expiring; and to report to the House, a Statement of all such expired Laws, as shall appear to them to have been made upon Occasions, whereof the like may recur hereafter, and also, a Statement of all the expiring Laws of every Sort whatever of a Public Nature; describing each Statute by its principal Matter, Date, Chapter, Section, and Title; and distinguishing the Duration of such as are expiring; together with the Observations of the said Committee, growing out of the several Matters referred to them."

=== Membership ===
The committee was appointed on 12 April 1796, consisting of 14 members with a quorum of five and the power to "send for persons, papers, and records".

Name	Commentary
Charles Abbot MP	Chair
Serjeant William Best MP	
John Scott MP	Attorney General
Sir John Mitford MP	Solicitor General
Charles Townshend MP	
Thomas Powys MP	
Hon. Henry Hobart MP	
William Mainwaring MP	
Henry Bankes MP	
Isaac Hawkins Browne MP	
Sir Adam Fergusson, 3rd Baronet MP	
Sir Richard Arden MP	Master of the Rolls
Sir William Scott MP	Added on 18 April 1796.
Thomas Berney Bramston MP	Added on 18 April 1796.

== Report ==
The committee first met on 13 April 1796 and was granted the power to report to the House on 21 April 1796. The committee reported on 12 May 1796.

The committee found that there was no authentic and entire publication of the statutes, a problem compounded by the fact that many statutes had never been printed and that some of those printed were not faithful to the original and the increased volume of the statute book, which contained obsolete, obscure and poorly drafted statutes.

The committee also summarised the history of statute law revision, finding that despite the attention of previous parliaments since the 16th-century, nothing substantial had been achieved.

The committee recommended the "extreme importance" of obtaining a "complete and authentic publication of the statutes", and suggested the recompiling of past laws by conducting a detailed examination of all laws, identifying:

1. Existing perpetual laws, labelling each as fit to stand, able to be simplified, or able to be repealed and replaced by a new law.
2. Existing but expiring laws, labelling each as fit to stand or to be made perpetual.
3. Repealed laws, labelling each as fit to be re-enacted or not.
4. Expired laws, labelling each as fit to be revived or not.

The committee provided examples of Consolidation Acts, including: (Note: The Journals of the House of Commons and the published report differ slightly in the acts cited.)

- Statute of Artificers 1562 (5 Eliz. 1 c. 4)
- Navy Act 1748 (22 Geo. 2. c. 33)
- Gunpowder Act 1772 (12 Geo. 3. c. 61)
- Highways Act 1773 (13 Geo. 3. c. 78) (Note: Incorrectly cited as "13 Geo. 3. c. 74" in the source.)
- Turnpike Roads Act 1773 (13 Geo. 3. c. 84)
- Clergy Residences Repair Act 1776 (17 Geo. 3. c. 53)
- Militia Act 1786 (26 Geo. 3. c. 107) (Note: Incorrectly cited as "26 Geo. 3. c. 167" in some sources.)
- Customs and Excise Act 1787 (27 Geo. 3. c.13) (Note: Described in the act as "The general Customs House Act, for Duties and Drawbacks", although not cited exactly. Given the importance of the act, the chronological ordering of the list and the fact that the act is cited later in the report, this is the most probably act the committee to which the referred.)
- Exportation (No. 2) Act 1788 (28 Geo. 3. c. 38) (Note: Incorrectly cited as "28 Geo. 3. c. 28" in the source.)
- Importation and Exportation (No. 2) Act 1791 (31 Geo. 3. c. 30)
- The general Act for Seamen's Wages (Note: Incorrectly cited as "32 Geo. 3. c. 28" in the source.)

The committee recognised specifically the preamble of the Statute of Artificers 1562 (5 Eliz. 1 c. 4) and the abstract of the law in the Navy Act 1757 (31 Geo. 2. c. 10) and the Marines Act 1792 (32 Geo. 3. c. 67) as models for future drafting.

The committee provided examples of repeal, revival and continuance acts passed during the reigns of Queen Elizabeth I and King James I of England, including: (Note: The Journals of the House of Commons and the published report differ slightly in the acts cited.)

- Continuance, etc. of Laws Act 1597 (39 Eliz. 1. c. 18), which repealed 53 acts of parliament
- Continuance, etc. of Laws Act 1603 (1 Jac. 1. c. 25), which repealed 15 acts of parliament and revived 45 acts of parliament
- Continuance, etc. of Laws Act 1623 (21 Jac. 1. c. 28), which repealed 71 acts of parliament and revived 64 acts of parliament

The committee recognised the importance of the Committee for Expired and Expiring Laws appointed annually to enquire what laws were fit to be revived or continued, but cited irregularities and mistakes, including:

- Temporary laws enacted by the insertion of a clause in the body of a perpetual act, for example the Customs and Excise Act 1787 (27 Geo. 3. c. 13).
- Inconsistent operating words, for example in acts continuing wars.
- Inconsistent expression of duration, for example in the preamble, first section, middle (the Colonial Trade Act 1763 (4 Geo. 3. c. 27) and the Importation, etc. Act 1766 (6 Geo. 3. c. 28) or generally the close of the act.
- The occasional requirement to infer duration from the text, for example the Aid to Government of France Act 1794 (34 Geo. 3. c. 9), the Effects of Residents in France Act 1794 (34 Geo. 3. c. 79), the Importation Act 1795 (35 Geo. 3. c. 15) and the Shipping Act 1795 (35 Geo. 3. c. 80).
- Retrospective or prospective enactments, for example the Taxation (No. 3) Act 1640 (16 Car. 1. c. 4).
- The occasional existence of laws on legislation of other countries, for example the Composition for a Crown Debt Act 1784 (24 Geo. 3. St. 2).
- The continuance of punishments of offences committed under temporary acts, for example the Customs (No. 3) Act 1789 (29 Geo. 3. c. 64), the Manning of the Navy, etc. Act 1793 (33 Geo. 3. c. 66) and the Slave Trade Act 1794 (34 Geo. 3. c. 80)
- The variety of periods prescribed for the duration of each statute, for example the Continuance of Laws Act 1796 (36 Geo. 3. c. 40).

This resulted in inconsistencies. For example, section 3 of the Wales and Berwick Act 1746 (20 Geo. 2. c. 42), an act relating to window tax, which illustrates what the text calls a "hotch-potch" (mixed or inconsistent) approach to legislation. Section 3 of this act contained a broad provision stating that all existing and future statutes mentioning England would automatically apply to Wales and Berwick-upon-Tweed, even when these places weren't specifically named. Then, oddly, section 4 immediately returns to discussing window tax specifically.

Furthermore, the committee criticised that laws confined to cases of limited description, but depending on some general principle, were not extended to all the cases which fall within the range of the principle.

To help with this, committee recommended that the Committee for Expired and Expiring Laws be required to inspect annually all the statutes of the preceding session and to insert into the Register of Expiring Laws those which are temporary, including their matter, date, chapter and duration. Once expired, these acts would be transferred to the Register of Expired Laws. The committee published these two tables as an appendix to their report.

The committee found that while all public and private acts from each session were recorded sequentially on the official statute roll, the King's Printer published them as separate public and private collections with different numbering systems, creating a mismatch between chapter numbers in the official roll and the printed versions. Additionally, the chapter numbers, section numbers, margin summaries, and punctuation in the printed versions were added solely by the King's Printer, resting on private authority.

The committee concluded by recommending that, for the promulgation of the statutes, the King's Printer be directed annually to print and sent a copy of all public acts to sheriffs, custos rotulorum, or clerks of the peace of each county.

== Legacy ==
The same year as the select committee published its report, the Select Committee on the Promulgation of the Statutes was appointed to consider the promulgation of the statutes of the United Kingdom.

The work of both committees drew attention to the unsatisfactory state of the statute book, following a resolution of the House of Commons on 20 March 1797 that "that his Majesty's printer should also be authorized to class the general and the special statutes (viz. the public, local, and private acts) of each session in separate volumes, and to number the chapters of each volume, together with a general table of all the acts passed in that session". This led to the distinction now recognised between public general acts, local and personal acts and private acts.

The work of both committees led to an improvement in the classification of statutes, and to the distinction now recognised by between public general acts, local and personal acts and private acts.

In 1806, the Commission on Public Records passed a resolution requesting the production of a report on the best mode of reducing the volume of the statute book. From 1810 to 1825, The Statutes of the Realm was published, providing for the first time the authoritative collection of acts.

In 1822, Sir Robert Peel MP entered the cabinet as home secretary. The work of the committee was referenced in Peel's speech on the consolidation of the criminal law on 9 March 1826. Peel introduced a number of reforms to the English criminal law, which became known as Peel's Acts.

== See also ==
- Statute Law Revision Act
