= Continuance of Laws Act 1793 =

Act of the Parliament of Great Britain

- Act of Parliament
- Parliament of Great Britain
- Long title: An Act to continue several Laws relating to the landing Rum or Spirits of the British Sugar Plantations before Payment of the Duties of Excise; to the giving further Encouragement to the Importation of Naval Stores from the British Colonies in America; to the granting Liberty to carry Sugars of the Growth, Produce, or Manufacture of any of His Majesty's Sugar Colonies directly to foreign Parts, in Ships built in Great Britain and navigated according to Law; to the permitting the Exportation of Tobacco Pipe Clay, from this Kingdom to the British Sugar Colonies or Plantations in the West Indies; to the granting a Bounty on certain Species of British and Irish Linens exported, and taking off the Duties on the Importation of Foreign Raw Linen Yarns made of Flax; to the prohibiting the Exportation of Tools and Utensils made Use of in the Iron and Steel Manufactures of this Kingdom, and to prevent the seducing of Artificers and Workmen employed in those Manufactures, to go into Parts beyond the Seas; to the ascertaining the Strength of Spirits by Clarke's Hydrometer; and to revive and continue an Act made in the Twenty-third Year of His present Majesty's Reign, for the more effectual Encouragement of the Manufactures of Flax and Cotton in Great Britain.
- Citation: 33 Geo. 3. c. 40
- Territorial extent: Great Britain

Dates
- Royal assent: 3 June 1793
- Commencement: 3 June 1793 (Note: The Acts of Parliament (Commencement) Act 1793.)
- Repealed: 21 August 1871

Other legislation
- Amends: See § Revived and continued enactments
- Repealed by: Statute Law Revision Act 1871
- Relates to: See Expiring laws continuance acts

Status: Repealed

Text of statute as originally enacted

The Continuance of Laws Act 1793 (33 Geo. 3. c. 40) was an act of the Parliament of Great Britain that revived and continued various older acts.

== Background ==
In the United Kingdom, acts of Parliament remain in force until expressly repealed. Many acts of parliament, however, contained time-limited sunset clauses, requiring legislation to revive enactments that had expired or to continue enactments that would otherwise expire.

== Provisions ==
=== Revived and continued enactments ===
Section 1 of the act continued the Spirit Duties, etc. Act 1741 (15 & 16 Geo. 2. c. 25) "as relates to the landing of Rum or Spirits of the British Sugar Plantations, before Payment of the Duties of Excise, and to the lodging of the fame in Warehouses, at the Expence of the Importers or Proprietors thereof", as continued by the Continuance of Laws, etc. Act 1749 (23 Geo. 2. c. 26), the Passage from Charing Cross Act 1757 (31 Geo. 2. c. 36), the Continuance of Laws (No. 2) Act 1763 (4 Geo. 3. c. 12), the Continuance of Certain Laws, etc. Act 1771 (11 Geo. 3. c. 51), the Continuance of Laws Act 1779 (19 Geo. 3. c. 22) and the Customs (No. 2) Act 1785 (25 Geo. 3. c. 69), from the expiration of those enactments until the end of the next session of parliament after 29 September 1799.

Section 2 of the act continued the Importation Act 1721 (8 Geo. 1. c. 12) "as relates to the Importation of Wood and Timber, and of the Goods commonly called Lumber, therein particularly enumerated, from any of his Majesty's British Plantations or Colonies in America, free from all Customs and Impositions whatsoever", as continued by the Continuance of Laws, etc. Act 1742 (16 Geo. 2. c. 26), the Continuance of Laws Act 1750 (24 Geo. 2. c. 52), the Continuance of Laws, etc. Act 1757 (31 Geo. 2. c. 1), the Continuance of Laws (No. 2) Act 1763 (4 Geo. 3. c. 12), the Continuance of Certain Laws Act 1772 (12 Geo. 3. c. 56), the Continuance of Laws Act 1779 (19 Geo. 3. c. 22) and the Continuance of Laws Act 1786 (26 Geo. 3. c. 53), from the expiration of those enactments until the end of the next session of parliament after 29 September 1795.

Section 3 of the act continued the Colonial Trade Act 1738 (12 Geo. 2. c. 30), as continued by the Universities (Wine Licences) Act 1743 (17 Geo. 2. c. 40), the Continuance of Laws (No.) 2) Act 1750 (24 Geo. 2. c. 57), the Continuance of Laws, etc., (No. 2) Act 1757 (31 Geo. 2. c. 35), the Continuance of Laws Act 1763 (4 Geo. 3. c. 11), the Continuance of Certain Laws Act 1772 (12 Geo. 3. c. 56), the Continuance of Laws Act 1778 (18 Geo. 3. c. 45) and the Continuance of Laws Act 1786 (26 Geo. 3. c. 53), from the expiration of the act until the end of the next session of parliament after 29 September 1799, subject to the regulations contained in the Customs (No. 2) Act 1792 (32 Geo. 3. c. 43).

Section 4 of the act continued the Customs (No. 6) Act 1776 (17 Geo. 3. c. 43) "as permits the exportation of tobacco-pipe clay from this kingdom to the British sugar colonies or plantations in the West Indies", as continued by the Continuance of Laws (No. 2) Act 1780 (20 Geo. 3. c. 19), the Continuance of Laws Act 1783 (23 Geo. 3. c. 6) and the Continuance of Laws Act 1788 (28 Geo. 3. c. 23), from the expiration of those enactments until the next session of parliament after 24 June 1799.

Section 5 of the act continued the Exportation Act 1756 (29 Geo. 2. c. 15), as continued by the Exportation (No. 4) Act 1770 (10 Geo. 3. c. 38), the Bounties Act 1779 (19 Geo. 3. c. 27), the Continuance of Laws Act 1787 (27 Geo. 3. c. 36), the Continuance of Laws (No. 2) Act 1788 (28 Geo. 3. c. 24) and the Continuance of Laws, etc. Act 1791 (31 Geo. 3. c. 43), from the expiration of the act until the end of the next session of parliament after 24 June 1794.

Section 6 of the act continued the Exportation (No. 4) Act 1786 (26 Geo. 3. c. 89), as continued by the Continuance of Laws Act 1787 (27 Geo. 3. c. 36), the Continuance of Laws Act 1788 (28 Geo. 3. c. 23), the Continuance of Laws Act 1789 (29 Geo. 3. c. 55), the Continuance of Laws Act 1790 (30 Geo. 3. c. 18), the Continuance of Laws, etc. Act 1791 (31 Geo. 3. c. 43) and the Continuance of Laws Act 1792 (32 Geo. 3. c. 36), until the end of the next session of parliament.

Section 7 of the act continued the Exports Act 1787 (27 Geo. 3. c. 31) "as directs that all Spirits shall be deemed and taken to be of the Degree of Strength as Which the Hydrometer, commonly called Clarke's Hydrometer, shall, upon Trial of any Officer or Officers of Excise, denote any such Spirits to be", as continued by the Continuance of Laws Act 1788 (28 Geo. 3. c. 23), the Continuance of Laws Act 1789 (29 Geo. 3. c. 55), the Continuance of Laws Act 1790 (30 Geo. 3. c. 18), the Ascertaining of Strength of Spirits Act 1791 (31 Geo. 3. c. 44) and the Continuance of Laws Act 1792 (32 Geo. 3. c. 36), until the end of the next session of parliament.

Section 8 of the act revived and continued the Flax, etc., Manufacture Act 1783 (23 Geo. 3. c. 77), as continued by the Continuance of Laws Act 1786 (26 Geo. 3. c. 53), the Continuance of Laws Act 1788 (28 Geo. 3. c. 23) and the Flax and Cotton Manufactures Act 1789 (29 Geo. 3. c. 54), from the passing of the act until the end of the next session of parliament 2 years after the expiration of the act.

== Subsequent developments ==
The Select Committee on Temporary Laws, Expired or Expiring, appointed in 1796, inspected and considered all temporary laws, observing irregularities in the construction of expiring laws continuance acts, making recommendations and emphasising the importance of the Committee for Expired and Expiring Laws.

The whole act was repealed by section 1 of, and the schedule to, the Statute Law Revision Act 1871 (34 & 35 Vict. c. 116), which came into force on 21 August 1871.
