= Continuance of Laws Act 1786 =

Act of the Parliament of Great Britain

- Act of Parliament
- Parliament of Great Britain
- Long title: An Act to continue several Laws relating to the giving further Encouragement to the Importation of Naval Stores from the British Colonies in America; to the Allowance upon the Exportation of British made Gunpowder; to the further encouraging the Manufacture of British Sail Cloth, and to the Duties payable on Foreign Sail Cloth; to the granting Liberty to carry Sugars of the Growth, Produce, or Manufacture of any of His Majesty's Sugar Colonies, directly to Foreign Parts, in Ships built in Great Britain, and navigated according to Law; to the importing Salt from Europe into the Province of Quebec in America, to the discontinuing the Duties payable upon the Importation of Tallow, Hog's Lard, and Grease; to the permitting the free Importation of Raw Goat Skins into this Kingdom; to the repealing the Duties upon Pot and Pearl Ashes, Wood and Weed Ashes imported into Great Britain, and for granting other Duties in Lieu thereof; to the registering the Prices at which Corn is sold in the several Counties of Great Britain, and the Quantity exported and imported; and to the effectually encouraging the Manufactures of Flax and Cotton in Great Britain; and to revive and continue several Laws relating to the allowing a Drawback of the Duties on Rum, shipped as Stores to be consumed on board Merchant Ships on their Voyages; and to the granting a Bounty upon the Importation of Hemp, and rough and undressed Flax from His Majesty's Colonies in America.
- Citation: 26 Geo. 3. c. 53
- Territorial extent: Great Britain

Dates
- Royal assent: 16 June 1786
- Commencement: 24 January 1786 (Note: Start of session.)
- Repealed: 21 August 1871

Other legislation
- Amends: See § Revived and continued enactments
- Repealed by: Statute Law Revision Act 1871
- Relates to: See Expiring laws continuance acts

Status: Repealed

Text of statute as originally enacted

The Continuance of Laws Act 1786 (26 Geo. 3. c. 53) was an act of the Parliament of Great Britain that revived and continued various older acts.

== Background ==
In the United Kingdom, acts of Parliament remain in force until expressly repealed. Many acts of parliament, however, contained time-limited sunset clauses, requiring legislation to revive enactments that had expired or to continue enactments that would otherwise expire.

== Provisions ==
=== Revived and continued enactments ===
Section 1 of the act continued the Importation Act 1721 (8 Geo. 1. c. 12) "as relates to the Importation of Wood and Timber, and of the Goods commonly called Lumber, therein particularly enumerated, from any of his Majesty's British Plantations or Colonies in America, free from all Customs and Impositions whatsoever", as continued by the Continuance of Laws, etc. Act 1742 (16 Geo. 2. c. 26), the Continuance of Laws Act 1750 (24 Geo. 2. c. 52), the Continuance of Laws, etc. Act 1757 (31 Geo. 2. c. 1), the Continuance of Laws (No. 2) Act 1763 (4 Geo. 3. c. 12), the Continuance of Certain Laws Act 1772 (12 Geo. 3. c. 56) and the Continuance of Laws Act 1779 (19 Geo. 3. c. 22), from the expiration of those enactments until the end of the next session of parliament after 29 September 1792.

Section 2 of the act continued the Exportation Act 1730 (4 Geo. 2. c. 29), as continued by the Customs, etc. Act 1736 (10 Geo. 2. c. 27), the Continuance of Laws, etc. Act 1742 (16 Geo. 2. c. 26), the Continuance of Laws Act 1750 (24 Geo. 2. c. 52), the Passage from Charing Cross Act 1757 (31 Geo. 2. c. 36) , the Continuance of Laws Act 1763 (4 Geo. 3. c. 11), the Continuance of Certain Laws Act 1772 (12 Geo. 3. c. 56) and the Continuance of Laws Act 1778 (18 Geo. 3. c. 45), from the expiration of the act until the end of the next session of parliament after 29 September 1792.

Section 3 of the act continued the Manufacture of Sail Cloth Act 1735 (9 Geo. 2. c. 37), as continued by the Continuance of Laws, etc. Act 1739 (13 Geo. 2. c. 28), the Continuance of Laws Act 1750 (24 Geo. 2. c. 52), the Passage from Charing Cross Act 1757 (31 Geo. 2. c. 36), the Continuance of Laws Act 1763 (4 Geo. 3. c. 11), the Continuance of Certain Laws Act 1772 (12 Geo. 3. c. 56) and the Continuance of Laws Act 1778 (18 Geo. 3. c. 45), from the expiration of the act until the end of the next session of parliament after 29 September 1792.

Section 4 of the act continued the Colonial Trade Act 1738 (12 Geo. 2. c. 30), as continued by the Universities (Wine Licences) Act 1743 (17 Geo. 2. c. 40), the Continuance of Laws (No.) 2) Act 1750 (24 Geo. 2. c. 57), the Continuance of Laws, etc., (No. 2) Act 1757 (31 Geo. 2. c. 35), the Continuance of Laws Act 1763 (4 Geo. 3. c. 11), the Continuance of Certain Laws Act 1772 (12 Geo. 3. c. 56) and the Continuance of Laws Act 1778 (18 Geo. 3. c. 45), from the expiration of the act until the end of the next session of parliament after 29 September 1792.

Section 5 of the act continued the Importation into Quebec Act 1763 (4 Geo. 3. c. 19), as continued by the Importation into Quebec Act 1766 (6 Geo. 3. c. 42), the Importation and Exportation (No. 6) Act 1772 (13 Geo. 3. c. 69) and the Continuance of Laws (No. 2) Act 1780 (20 Geo. 3. c. 19), from the expiration of the act until the end of the next session of parliament after 24 June 1792.

Section 6 of the act continued the continued the Importation (No. 6) Act 1766 (7 Geo. 3. c. 12), as continued by the Discontinuance of Duties Act 1770 (10 Geo. 3. c. 8), the Importation and Exportation (No. 5) Act 1772 (13 Geo. 3. c. 5) the Customs Act 1776 (16 Geo. 3. c. 12) and the Customs Act 1782 (22 Geo. 3. c. 20), from the expiration of the act until the end of the next session of parliament after 25 March 1788.

Section 7 of the act continued the Customs (No. 2) Act 1775 (15 Geo. 3. c. 35), as continued by the and the Continuance of Laws (No. 2) Act 1780 (20 Geo. 3. c. 19), from the expiration of the act until the end of the next session of parliament after 20 June 1790.

Section 8 of the act continued the Customs (No. 2) Act 1780 (20 Geo. 3. c. 25), as continued by the Continuance of Laws Act 1783 (23 Geo. 3. c. 6), from the expiration of the act until the next session of parliament after 31 May 1789.

Section 9 of the act continued the Corn Act 1770 (10 Geo. 3. c. 39), as continued by the Continuance of Laws Act 1776 (17 Geo. 3. c. 44), until the end of the next session of parliament 7 years after the expiration of the act.

Section 10 of the act continued the Flax, etc., Manufacture Act 1783 (23 Geo. 3. c. 77) until the end of the next session of parliament 2 years after the expiration of the act.

Section 11 of the act revived and continued the act the Continuance of Laws Act 1779 (19 Geo. 3. c. 59) "as relates to allowing a Drawback on the Duties of Rum shipped as Stores to be consumed on board Merchant Ships on their Voyages", as continued by the Continuance of Laws Act 1781 (21 Geo. 3. c. 29) and the Exportation, etc. Act 1784 (24 Geo. 3. Sess. 2. c. 50), from the passing of the act until 1 April 1788.

Section 12 of the act revived and continued the Bounty upon Importation Act 1763 (4 Geo. 3. c. 26) from the passing of the act until 24 June 1786.

== Subsequent developments ==
The Select Committee on Temporary Laws, Expired or Expiring, appointed in 1796, inspected and considered all temporary laws, observing irregularities in the construction of expiring laws continuance acts, making recommendations and emphasising the importance of the Committee for Expired and Expiring Laws.

The whole act was repealed by section 1 of, and the schedule to, the Statute Law Revision Act 1871 (34 & 35 Vict. c. 116), which came into force on 21 August 1871.
