= Spirit Duties, etc. Act 1741 =

Act of the Parliament of Great Britain

- Act of Parliament
- Parliament of Great Britain
- Long title: An Act to impower the Importers or Proprietors of Rum or Spirits of the British Sugar Plantations to land the same before Payment of the Duties of Excise charged thereon, and to lodge the same in Warehouses at their own Expence; and for the Relief of Ralph Barrow, in respect to the Duty on some Rock Salt, lost by the overflowing of the Rivers Weaver and Dane.
- Citation: 15 Geo. 2. c. 25
- Territorial extent: Great Britain

Dates
- Royal assent: 15 July 1742
- Commencement: 29 September 1742 (Note: Section 1.)
- Repealed: 15 July 1867
Other legislation
| Amended by | Continuance of Laws, etc. Act 1749; Passage from Charing Cross Act 1757; Continuance of Laws (No. 2) Act 1763; Continuance of Certain Laws, etc. Act 1771; Continuance of Laws Act 1779; Customs (No. 2) Act 1785; Continuance of Laws Act 1793 |
| Repealed by | Statute Law Revision Act 1867 |

Status: Repealed

Text of statute as originally enacted

The Spirit Duties, etc. Act 1741 (15 Geo. 2. c. 25) was an act of the Parliament of Great Britain. It was passed in 1742, came into force from 29 September 1742, and was expressly repealed in 1867. It allowed rum brought from the colonies to be stored on shore before the excise duty was paid.

== Aims ==
The act aimed to simplify the importation of spirits. Previously, it was required to pay the excise duties on the entire shipment before it could be landed and sold. This meant that any delay in organising payment would require the ship carrying the spirits to remain in port until the cargo was cleared, both straining the capacity of the harbour and leaving the merchant with the additional costs of chartering the ship longer than anticipated. In order to avoid this, it was enacted that the cargo could be offloaded into specified secure warehouses on shore, at the importers' expense, if they gave their bond or security for the value of the duties. Duties would then be collected by the excise officers on the cargo as it was sold from the warehouses; if any remained unsold after six months from landing, the remaining duty was payable on it as a lump sum on that date.

== Conditions ==
The remainder of the act laid down the various conditions for the operations of these warehouses. Any spirits landed without warrant from the customs officials were to be forfeited, with half to the Crown and half to the informer. All spirits held were to be fully documented, and not sold in quantities under a twenty-gallon cask.

== Period of operation ==
The act was in force from 29 September 1742 to 29 September 1749.

The act was continued as relates "to the landing of rum or spirits of the British sugar plantations, before payment of the duties of excise, and to the lodging of the same in warehouses at the expence of the importers or proprietors thereof" from the expiration of those enactments until the end of the next session of parliament after 29 September 1757 by section 1o the Continuance of Laws, etc. Act 1749 (23 Geo. 2. c. 26).

The act was continued as relates "to the landing of rum or spirits of the British sugar plantations, before payment of the duties of excise, and to the lodging of the same in warehouses at the expence of the importers or proprietors thereof" from the expiration of those enactments until the end of the next session of parliament after 29 September 1764 by section 4 of the Passage from Charing Cross Act 1757 (31 Geo. 2. c. 36).

The act was continued as relates "to the landing of rum or spirits of the British sugar plantations, before payment of the duties of excise, and to the lodging of the same in warehouses at the expence of the importers or proprietors thereof" from the expiration of those enactments until the end of the next session of parliament after 29 September 1771 by section 2 of the Continuance of Laws (No. 2) Act 1763 (4 Geo. 3. c. 12).

The act was continued as relates "to the landing of rum or spirits of the British sugar plantations, before payment of the duties of excise, and to the lodging of the same in warehouses at the expence of the importers or proprietors thereof" from the expiration of those enactments until the end of the next session of parliament after 29 September 1778 by section 2 of the Continuance of Certain Laws, etc. Act 1771 (11 Geo. 3. c. 51).

The act was continued as relates "to the landing of rum or spirits of the British sugar plantations, before payment of the duties of excise, and to the lodging of the same in warehouses at the expence of the importers or proprietors thereof" from the expiration of those enactments until the end of the next session of parliament after 29 September 1785 by section 3 of the Continuance of Laws Act 1779 (19 Geo. 3. c. 22).

The act was continued as relates "to the landing of rum or spirits of the British sugar plantations, before payment of the duties of excise, and to the lodging of the same in warehouses at the expence of the importers or proprietors thereof" from the expiration of those enactments until the end of the next session of parliament after 29 September 1792 by section 6 of the Customs (No. 2) Act 1785 (25 Geo. 3. c. 69).

The act was continued as relates "to the landing of rum or spirits of the British sugar plantations, before payment of the duties of excise, and to the lodging of the same in warehouses at the expence of the importers or proprietors thereof" from the expiration of those enactments until the end of the next session of parliament after 29 September 1799 by section 3 of the Continuance of Laws Act 1793 (33 Geo. 3. c. 40).

The whole act was repealed by section 1 of, and the schedule to, the Statute Law Revision Act 1867 (30 & 31 Vict. c. 59).

== Section 11 ==
Section 11 of the act was not concerned with the importation of spirits, but instead served to discharge the liability on one Ralph Barrow of Northwich for the duties payable on seventeen tons of rock salt which had been lost to flooding in Cheshire in December 1740.
