= Continuance of Laws Act 1776 (1777 act) =

Act of the Parliament of Great Britain

- Act of Parliament
- Parliament of Great Britain
- Long title: An Act to continue the several Laws therein mentioned, relating to encouraging the making of Indico in the British Plantations in America; to the registering the Prices at which Corn is sold in the several Counties of Great Britain, and the Quantity exported and imported; to encouraging the manufacturing of Leather, by lowering the Duty payable upon the Importation of Oak Bark, when the Price of such Bark shall exceed a certain Rate; to the allowing Timber and Wood to be exported from the Island of Dominica into any other of the British Islands, Colonies or Plantations in America; and to the allowing a Bounty on the Exportation of British-made Cordage.
- Citation: 17 Geo. 3. c. 44
- Territorial extent: Great Britain

Dates
- Royal assent: 2 June 1777
- Commencement: 31 October 1776 (Note: Start of session.)
- Repealed: 21 August 1871

Other legislation
- Amends: See § Continued enactments
- Repealed by: Statute Law Revision Act 1871
- Relates to: See Expiring laws continuance acts

Status: Repealed

Text of statute as originally enacted

The Continuance of Laws Act 1776 (17 Geo. 3. c. 44) was an act of the Parliament of Great Britain that continued various older acts.

== Background ==
In the United Kingdom, acts of Parliament remain in force until they are expressly repealed. However, many acts contained time-limited sunset clauses, requiring legislation to revive enactments that had expired or to continue enactments that would otherwise expire.

== Provisions ==
=== Continued enactments ===
Section 1 of the act continued the Importation of Indigo Act 1747 (21 Geo. 2. c. 30), as continued by the Making of Indigo Act 1755 (28 Geo. 2. c. 25), as amended and continued by the Continuance etc. of Acts Act 1763 (3 Geo. 3. c. 25) and subsequently continued by the Making of Indigo, etc. Act 1770 (10 Geo. 3. c. 37), from their expiration until the end of the next session of parliament after 25 March 1781.

Section 2 of the act continued the Corn Act 1770 (10 Geo. 3. c. 39) until the end of the next session of parliament after 7 years from the expiration of the act.

Section 3 of the act continued the Customs (No. 1) Act 1772 (12 Geo. 3. c. 50) until the end of the next session of parliament after 5 years from its expiration.

Section 4 of the act continued the Importation and Exportation (No. 9) Act 1772 (13 Geo. 3. c. 73) as relates "to allowing timber or wood from the island of Dominica into any of other of the British islands, colonies, or plantations in America, for a limited time" from the expiration of the act until the end of the next session of parliament after 1 November 1781.

Section 5 of the act continued the Bounty of Exportation Act 1766 (6 Geo. 3. c. 45), as amended and continued by the Customs (No. 2) Act 1772 (12 Geo. 3. c. 60) and as continued by the Continuance of Laws, etc. Act 1774 (14 Geo. 3. c. 86), until the end of the next session of parliament after 4 years from the expiration of the act.

== Subsequent developments ==
The Select Committee on Temporary Laws, Expired or Expiring, appointed in 1796, inspected and considered all temporary laws, observing irregularities in the construction of expiring laws continuance acts, making recommendations and emphasising the importance of the Committee for Expired and Expiring Laws.

The whole act was repealed by section 1 and the schedule of the Statute Law Revision Act 1871 (34 & 35 Vict. c. 116).
