= Making of Indigo, etc. Act 1770 =

Act of the Parliament of Great Britain

- Act of Parliament
- Parliament of Great Britain
- Long title: An Act for continuing so much of an Act, made in the Third Year of His present Majesty's Reign, intituled, "An Act to continue and amend Two Acts, made in the Twenty-first and Twenty-eighth Years of His late Majesty's Reign, for encouraging the making of Indict in the British Plantations in America; and for the extending the Provisions of an Act of the Thirtieth Year of His late Majesty's Reign, with respect to bringing Prize Goods into this Kingdom, to Spanish Prize Goods taken since the late Declaration of War with Spain," as relates to encouraging the making of Indico in the British Plantations in America; and for explaining so much of an Act, made in the Fifth Year of His present Majesty's Reign, as relates to the regulating the Fees of the Officers of the Customs in America, and for extending the same to the Naval Officers there.
- Citation: 10 Geo. 3. c. 37
- Territorial extent: Great Britain

Dates
- Royal assent: 19 May 1770
- Commencement: 9 January 1770 (Note: Start of session.)
- Repealed: 15 July 1867
Other legislation
Amends	See § Continued enactments
Amended by	Continuance of Certain Laws Act 1772; Continuance of Laws, etc. Act 1774; Continuance of Laws Act 1779; Continuance of Laws Act 1783
Repealed by	Statute Law Revision Act 1867
Relates to	See Expiring laws continuance acts

Status: Repealed

Text of statute as originally enacted

The Making of Indigo, etc. Act 1770 (10 Geo. 3. c. 37) was an act of the Parliament of Great Britain that continued various older acts.

== Background ==
In the United Kingdom, acts of Parliament remain in force until expressly repealed. Many acts of parliament, however, contained time-limited sunset clauses, requiring legislation to revive enactments that had expired or to continue enactments that would otherwise expire.

== Provisions ==
=== Continued enactments ===
Section 1 of the act continued the Importation of Indigo Act 1747 (21 Geo. 2. c. 30), as continued by the Making of Indigo Act 1755 (28 Geo. 2. c. 25) and as amended and continued by the Continuance etc. of Acts Act 1763 (3 Geo. 3. c. 25), from the expiration of the act until the end of the next session of parliament after 25 March 1777.

Section 2 of the act extended the provisions of the Importation (No. 3) Act 1765 (5 Geo. 3. c. 10), providing that until the end of the next session of parliament after 2 years from 1 August 1770, every collector, comptroller, and other officer of his Majesty's customs in the British colonies shall be entitled to demand and receive fees as were generally and usually accustomed to be demanded before the 29 September 1764, with penalties for exacting greater fees including forfeiture of fifty pounds (one moiety to his Majesty and the other to the prosecutor) and incapacity of executing any office in the customs or navy for the first offence, and for the second offence, forfeiture of place or office and incapacity of employment in customs or navy.

== Subsequent developments ==
So much of the act as relates to the Importation (No. 3) Act 1765 (5 Geo. 3. c. 10) was continued from the expiration of the enactment until the end of the next session of parliament after 1 August 1774 by section 6 of the Continuance of Certain Laws Act 1772 (12 Geo. 3. c. 56).

So much of the act "as relates to the regulating the Fees of the Officers of the Customs in America, and for extending the same to the Naval Officers there", was continued from the expiration of that enactment to the end of the next session of parliament after 29 September 1778 by section 12 of the Continuance of Laws, etc. Act 1774 (14 Geo. 3. c. 86).

So much of the act "as relates to the regulating the Fees of the Officers of the Customs in America, and for extending the same to the Naval Officers there", was continued from the expiration of that enactment to the end of the next session of parliament after 1 August 1782 by section 5 of the Continuance of Laws Act 1779 (19 Geo. 3. c. 22).

So much of the act "as relates to the regulating the Fees of the Officers of the Customs in America, and for extending the same to the Naval Officers there", was continued from the expiration of that enactment to the end of the next session of parliament after 1 August 1786 by section 1 of the Continuance of Laws Act 1783 (23 Geo. 3. c. 6).

The whole act was repealed by section 1 of, and the schedule to, the Statute Law Revision Act 1867 (30 & 31 Vict. c. 59).
