= Continuance of Laws Act 1783 =

Act of the Parliament of Great Britain

- Act of Parliament
- Parliament of Great Britain
- Long title: An Act to continue several Laws relating to the regulating the Fees of Officers of the Customs and Naval Officers in America; to the allowing the Exportation of certain Quantities of Wheat, and other Articles, to His Majesty's Sugar Colonies in America; to the permitting the Exportation of Tobacco Pipe Clay from this Kingdom to the British Sugar Colonies or Plantations in the West Indies; and to the repealing the Duties upon Pot and Pearl Ashes, Wood and Weed Ashes imported into Great Britain; and for granting other Duties in lieu thereof.
- Citation: 23 Geo. 3. c. 6
- Territorial extent: Great Britain

Dates
- Royal assent: 14 March 1783
- Commencement: 5 December 1782 (Note: Start of session.)
- Repealed: 21 August 1871

Other legislation
- Amends: See § Continued enactments
- Repealed by: Statute Law Revision Act 1871
- Relates to: See Expiring laws continuance acts

Status: Repealed

Text of statute as originally enacted

The Continuance of Laws Act 1783 (23 Geo. 3. c. 6) was an act of the Parliament of Great Britain that continued various older acts.

== Background ==
In the United Kingdom, acts of Parliament remain in force until expressly repealed. Many acts of parliament, however, contained time-limited sunset clauses, requiring legislation to revive enactments that had expired or to continue enactments that would otherwise expire.

== Provisions ==
=== Continued enactments ===
Section 1 of the act continued the Making of Indigo, etc. Act 1770 (10 Geo. 3. c. 37) "as relates to the regulating of Fees of the Officers of the Customs in America, and for extending the same to the Naval Officers there", as continued by the Continuance of Certain Laws Act 1772 (12 Geo. 3. c. 56), the Continuance of Laws, etc. Act 1774 (14 Geo. 3. c. 86) and the Continuance of Laws Act 1779 (19 Geo. 3. c. 22), from the expiration of those enactments until the end of the next session of parliament after 1 August 1786.

Section 2 of the act continued the Exportation Act 1776 (16 Geo. 3. c. 37) "as relates to allowing the exportation of certain quantities of wheat, and other articles to his Majesty's sugar colonies in America", as continued by the Exportation (No. 2) Act 1776 (17 Geo. 3. c. 28), the Exportation Act 1778 (18 Geo. 3. c. 16), the Continuance of Laws Act 1779 (19 Geo. 3. c. 22), the Continuance of Laws (No. 2) Act 1780 (20 Geo. 3. c. 19), the Continuance of Laws Act 1781 (21 Geo. 3. c. 29) and the Continuance of Laws Act 1782 (22 Geo. 3. c. 13), until 1 May 1784.

Section 3 of the act continued the Customs (No. 6) Act 1776 (17 Geo. 3. c. 43) "as permits the exportation of tobacco-pipe clay from this kingdom to the British sugar colonies or plantations in the West Indies", as continued by the Continuance of Laws (No. 2) Act 1780 (20 Geo. 3. c. 19), from the expiration of those enactments until the next session of parliament after 24 June 1787.

Section 4 of the act continued the Customs (No. 2) Act 1780 (20 Geo. 3. c. 25) from the expiration of the act until the next session of parliament after 31 May 1786.

== Subsequent developments ==
The Select Committee on Temporary Laws, Expired or Expiring, appointed in 1796, inspected and considered all temporary laws, observing irregularities in the construction of expiring laws continuance acts, making recommendations and emphasising the importance of the Committee for Expired and Expiring Laws.

Section 2 from " and that all Records " to the end was repealed by section 1 of, and the schedule to, the Statute Law Revision Act 1871 (34 & 35 Vict. c. 116), which came into force on 21 August 1871.
