= Continuance of Laws Act 1779 =

Act of the Parliament of Great Britain

- Act of Parliament
- Parliament of Great Britain
- Long title: An Act to continue several Laws relating to the giving further Encouragement for the Importation of Naval Stores from the British Colonies in America; to the landing of Rum or Spirits of the British Sugar Plantations, before Payment of the Duties of Excise; to the discontinuing the Duties payable upon the Importation of Tallow, Hogs Lard and Grease; to the regulating the Fees of Officers of the Customs and Naval Officers in America; to the allowing the Exportation of certain Quantities of Wheat, and other Articles, to His Majesty's Sugar Colonies in America; and to the allowing a Drawback of the Duties on Rum, shipped as Stores, to be consumed on board Merchant Ships on their Voyages.
- Citation: 19 Geo. 3. c. 22
- Territorial extent: Great Britain

Dates
- Royal assent: 1 April 1779
- Commencement: 26 November 1778 (Note: Start of session.)
- Repealed: 5 July 1825
Other legislation
Amends	See § Revived and continued enactments
Amended by	Continuance of Laws Act 1781; Exportation, etc. Act 1784; Continuance of Laws Act 1786
Repealed by	Customs Law Repeal Act 1825
Relates to	See Expiring laws continuance acts

Status: Repealed

Text of statute as originally enacted

The Continuance of Laws Act 1779 (19 Geo. 3. c. 22) was an act of the Parliament of Great Britain that revived and continued various older acts.

== Background ==
In the United Kingdom, acts of Parliament remain in force until expressly repealed. Many acts of parliament, however, contained time-limited sunset clauses, requiring legislation to revive enactments that had expired or to continue enactments that would otherwise expire.

== Provisions ==
=== Revived and continued enactments ===
Section 1 of the act continued the Importation Act 1721 (8 Geo. 1. c. 12) "as relates to the Importation of Wood and Timber, and of the Goods commonly called Lumber, therein particularly enumerated, from any of his Majesty's British Plantations or Colonies in America, free from all Customs and Impositions whatsoever", as continued by the Continuance of Laws, etc. Act 1742 (16 Geo. 2. c. 26), the Continuance of Laws Act 1750 (24 Geo. 2. c. 52), the Continuance of Laws, etc. Act 1757 (31 Geo. 2. c. 1), the Continuance of Laws (No. 2) Act 1763 (4 Geo. 3. c. 12) and the Continuance of Certain Laws Act 1772 (12 Geo. 3. c. 56), from the expiration of those enactments until the end of the next session of parliament after 29 September 1785.

Section 2 of the act provided that imported goods must be properly entered in the Custom-house at the port of importation, documenting their quantities and qualities, and landed in the presence of the proper Officer, or else be subject to duties as if the Importation Act 1721 (8 Geo. 1. c. 12) had not been made, with provisions for seizure and sale of goods if duties remain unpaid for six months.

Section 3 of the act continued the Spirit Duties, etc. Act 1741 (15 & 16 Geo. 2. c. 25) "as relates to the landing of Rum or Spirits of the British Sugar Plantations, before Payment of the Duties of Excise, and to the lodging of the fame in Warehouses, at the Expence of the Importers or Proprietors thereof", as continued by the Continuance of Laws, etc. Act 1749 (23 Geo. 2. c. 26), the Passage from Charing Cross Act 1757 (31 Geo. 2. c. 36), the Continuance of Laws (No. 2) Act 1763 (4 Geo. 3. c. 12) and the Continuance of Certain Laws, etc. Act 1771 (11 Geo. 3. c. 51), from the expiration of those enactments until the end of the next session of parliament after 29 September 1785.

Section 4 of the act revived and continued the Importation (No. 6) Act 1766 (7 Geo. 3. c. 12), as continued by the Discontinuance of Duties Act 1770 (10 Geo. 3. c. 8), the Importation and Exportation (No. 5) Act 1772 (13 Geo. 3. c. 5) and the Customs Act 1776 (16 Geo. 3. c. 12), from the expiration of the act until the end of the next session of parliament after 25 March 1782.

Section 5 of the act continued the Making of Indigo, etc. Act 1770 (10 Geo. 3. c. 37) "as relates to the regulating of Fees of the Officers of the Customs in America, and for extending the same to the Naval Officers there", as continued by the Continuance of Certain Laws Act 1772 (12 Geo. 3. c. 56) and the Continuance of Laws, etc. Act 1774 (14 Geo. 3. c. 86), from the expiration of those enactments until the end of the next session of parliament after 1 August 1782.

Section 6 of the act continued the Exportation Act 1776 (16 Geo. 3. c. 37) "as relates to allowing the Exportation of certain Quantities of Wheat, and other Articles to his Majesty's Sugar Colonies in America", as continued by the Exportation (No. 2) Act 1776 (17 Geo. 3. c. 28) and the Exportation Act 1778 (18 Geo. 3. c. 16), from the expiration of those enactments until 1 May 1780.

Section 7 of the act provided that during two years after passing of the act, merchants exporting rum or spirits as stores for voyages beyond the seas would receive drawbacks and allowances by giving five days' notice to Excise Commissioners specifying the destination, ship tonnage, and number of mariners, though no drawbacks would be allowed for casks containing less than one hundred gallons or vessels under one hundred tons.

== Subsequent developments ==
So much of the act "as relates to allowing a Drawback on the Duties of Rum shipped as Stores to be consumed on board Merchant Ships on their Voyages" was revived and continued from the passing of the act until 1 April 1782 by section 11 of the Continuance of Laws Act 1781 (21 Geo. 3. c. 29).

So much of the act "as relates to allowing a Drawback on the Duties of Rum shipped as Stores to be consumed on board Merchant Ships on their Voyages" was revived and continued from the passing of the act until 1 April 1886 by section 2 of the Exportation, etc. Act 1784 (24 Geo. 3. Sess. 2. c. 50).

So much of the act "as relates to allowing a Drawback on the Duties of Rum shipped as Stores to be consumed on board Merchant Ships on their Voyages" was revived and continued from the passing of the act until 1 April 1888 by section 11 of the Continuance of Laws Act 1786 (26 Geo. 3. c. 53).

The Select Committee on Temporary Laws, Expired or Expiring, appointed in 1796, inspected and considered all temporary laws, observing irregularities in the construction of expiring laws continuance acts, making recommendations and emphasising the importance of the Committee for Expired and Expiring Laws.

The whole act was repealed by the Customs Law Repeal Act 1825 (6 Geo. 4. c. 105), which came into force on 5 July 1825.
