= Continuance etc. of Acts Act 1763 =

Act of the Parliament of Great Britain

- Act of Parliament
- Parliament of Great Britain
- Long title: An Act to continue and amend Two Acts, made in the Twenty-first and Twenty-eighth Years of His late Majesty's Reign, for encouraging the making of Indico in the British Plantations in America; and for extending the Provisions of an Act of the Thirtieth Year of His late Majesty's Reign, with respect to bringing Prize Goods into this Kingdom, to Spanish Prize Goods taken since the late Declaration of War with Spain.
- Citation: 3 Geo. 3. c. 25
- Territorial extent: Great Britain

Dates
- Royal assent: 19 April 1763
- Commencement: 25 November 1762 (Note: Start of session.)
- Repealed: 15 July 1867
Other legislation
Amends	See § Continued enactments
Amended by	Making of Indigo, etc. Act 1770
Repealed by	Statute Law Revision Act 1867
Relates to	See Expiring laws continuance acts

Status: Repealed

Text of statute as originally enacted

The Continuance etc. of Acts Act 1763 (3 Geo. 3. c. 25) was an act of the Parliament of Great Britain that continued various older acts.

== Background ==
In the United Kingdom, acts of Parliament remain in force until expressly repealed. Many acts of parliament, however, contained time-limited sunset clauses, requiring legislation to revive enactments that had expired or to continue enactments that would otherwise expire.

== Provisions ==
=== Continued enactments ===
Section 1 of the act continued the Importation of Indigo Act 1747 (21 Geo. 2. c. 30), as continued by the Making of Indigo Act 1755 (28 Geo. 2. c. 25), from the expiration of the act until the end of the next session of parliament after 25 March 1770.

Section 2 of the act provided that after the expiration of the Importation of Indigo Act 1747 (21 Geo. 2. c. 30) provided for by the Making of Indigo Act 1755 (28 Geo. 2. c. 25), a bounty of 4d per pound would be allowed on all indigo imported.

Section 3 of the act provided that disputes over indigo quality at out ports could be resolved by the customs collector calling upon two or more skilled dyers, brokers, or others to determine on oath whether the indigo was entitled to the premium.

Section 4 of the act provided that if skilled persons could not be found at out ports to assess indigo quality, samples should be sent to customs commissioners in London (for English ports) or Edinburgh (for Scottish ports) for inspection according to the same procedures as indigo imported into London.

Section 5 of the act extended the provisions in the Prize Goods Act 1757 (30 Geo. 2. c. 18) to Spanish prize goods taken since the declaration of war with Spain.

== Subsequent developments ==
The provisions in the act amending the Importation of Indigo Act 1747 (21 Geo. 2. c. 30) were continued from the expiration of the act until the end of the next session of parliament after 25 March 1777 by section 1 of the Making of Indigo, etc. Act 1770 (10 Geo. 3. c. 37).

The Select Committee on Temporary Laws, Expired or Expiring, appointed in 1796, inspected and considered all temporary laws, observing irregularities in the construction of expiring laws continuance acts, making recommendations and emphasising the importance of the Committee for Expired and Expiring Laws.

The whole act was repealed by section 1 of, and the schedule to, the Statute Law Revision Act 1867 (30 & 31 Vict. c. 59).
