= Continuance of Laws, etc. Act 1749 =

Act of the Parliament of Great Britain

- Act of Parliament
- Parliament of Great Britain
- Long title: An Act to continue several Laws for the better regulating of Pilots, for the conducting of Ships and Vessels from Dover, Deal, and Isle of Thanet, up the River of Thames and Medway, and for permitting Rum or Spirits of the British Sugar Plantations to be landed before the Duties of Excise are paid thereon, and to continue and amend an Act for preventing Frauds in the Admeasurement of Coals, within the City and Liberty of Westminster, and several Parishes near thereunto, and to continue several Laws, for preventing Exactions of Occupiers of Locks and Wears upon the River Thames Westward, and for ascertaining the Rates of Water Carriage upon the said River, and for the better Regulation and Government of Seamen in the Merchants Service, and also to amend so much of an Act made in the First Year of the Reign of King George the First as relates to the better Preservation of Salmon in the River Ribble, and to regulate Fees in Trials at Assizes and Nisi Prius, upon Records issuing out of the Office of Pleas of the Court of Exchequer, and for the apprehending of Persons in any County or Place upon Warrants granted by Justices of the Peace in any other County or Place, and to repeal so much of an Act made in the Twelfth Year of the Reign of King Charles the Second as relates to the Time during which the Office of Excise is to be kept open each Day, and to appoint for how long Time the same shall be kept open each Day for the future, and to prevent the stealing or destroying of Turnips, and to amend an Act made in the Second Year of His present Majesty, for better Regulation of Attornies and Solicitors.
- Citation: 23 Geo. 2. c. 26
- Territorial extent: Great Britain

Dates
- Royal assent: 12 April 1750
- Commencement: 16 November 1749 (Note: Start of session.)
- Repealed: 15 July 1867
Other legislation
| Amends | See § Continued enactments |
| Amended by | Stealing of Vegetables Act 1772; Solicitors Act 1843; Salmon Fisheries Act 1861 |
| Repealed by | Statute Law Revision Act 1867 |
| Relates to | See Expiring laws continuance acts |

Status: Repealed

Text of statute as originally enacted

The Continuance of Laws, etc. Act 1749 (23 Geo. 2. c. 26) was an act of the Parliament of Great Britain that continued various older acts.

== Background ==
In the United Kingdom, acts of Parliament remain in force until expressly repealed. Many acts of parliament, however, contained time-limited sunset clauses, requiring legislation to revive enactments that had expired or to continue enactments that would otherwise expire.

== Provisions ==
=== Continued enactments ===
Section 1 of the act continued the Pilotage Act 1716 (3 Geo. 1. c. 13) and section 14 of the Trade to East Indies, etc. Act 1720 (7 Geo. 1. St. 1. c. 21), as continued by the Continuance of Laws, etc. Act 1723 (10 Geo. 1. c. 17) and the Continuance of Laws (No. 2) Act 1734 (8 Geo. 2. c. 21), from the expiration of those enactments until the end of the next session of parliament after 25 March 1764.

Section 2 of the act continued the Spirit Duties, etc. Act 1741 (15 Geo. 2. c. 25) as relates "to the landing of rum or spirits of the British sugar plantations, before payment of the duties of excise, and to the lodging of the same in warehouses at the expence of the importers or proprietors thereof" from the expiration of those enactments until the end of the next session of parliament after 29 September 1757.

Section 3 of the act continued the Coal Trade (London) Act 1745 (19 Geo. 2. c. 35) from the expiration of the act until the end of the next session of parliament after 24 December 1750.

Section 4 of the act provided that principal land coal-meters who neglect to station labouring coal-meters at required wharfs would forfeit ten pounds for each offense, while labouring coal-meters who fail to attend and perform their duties when stationed would forfeit forty shillings per offense, with these penalties to be recovered and applied in the same manner as other penalties in the Coal Trade (London) Act 1745 (19 Geo. 2. c. 35).

Section 5 of the act continued the Thames Navigation Act 1729 (3 Geo. 2 c. 11), as continued by the Laws Continuance, etc. Act 1739 (13 Geo. 2. c. 18), the Continuance of Laws Act 1746 (20 Geo. 2. c. 47) and the Continuance of Laws, etc. Act 1748 (22 Geo. 2. c. 46), from the expiration of the act until the end of the next session of parliament after 1 June 1754.

Section 6 of the act continued the Merchant Seamen Act 1728 (2 Geo. 2. c. 36), as continued by the Continuance of Laws (No. 2) Act 1734 (8 Geo. 2. c. 21), from the expiration of the act until the end of the next session of parliament after 25 March 1764.

Section 7 of the act amended section 14 of the Fish Act 1714 (1 Geo. 1. St. 2. c. 18) (Note: The margin note cites this as "1 Geo. 2. c. 18".), giving liberty to owners and proprietors of fisheries in the River Ribble, and their lessees, tenants, and agents, to take and kill salmon, salmon peal, or salmon kind by lawful means between 1 January and 15 September yearly, modifying the previous year-round restriction which was found inconvenient and disadvantageous to salmon fishing in that river.

Section 8 of the act provided that anyone taking, killing, destroying, or wilfully hurting salmon in the River Ribble between 14 September and 2 January would incur the same penalties, forfeitures, and punishments as were previously applied to salmon fishing between 31 July and 12 November, with offenders to be proceeded against and convicted in the same manner as directed in the Fish Act 1714 (1 Geo. 1. St. 2. c. 18).

Section 9 of the act declared the Fish Act 1714 (1 Geo. 1. St. 2. c. 18), as amended, to be in full force.

Section 10 of the act provided that after 24 June 1750, no officer or person shall demand, take, or receive higher fees for Nisi Prius records issuing from the Office of Pleas of the Exchequer than are taken for records in similar cases issuing from the courts of King's Bench and Common Pleas at Westminster, addressing a grievance where circuit officers had been charging higher fees for Exchequer records.

Section 11 of the act provided that after 24 June 1750, if a person with a warrant issued against them by justices of the peace escapes to another county or jurisdiction, any justice in the place where the offender has fled may endorse the original warrant upon application, allowing for the apprehension and return of the fugitive to the original jurisdiction for prosecution, overriding any contrary laws or usage.

Section 12 of the act repealed section 22 of the Tenures Abolition Act 1660 (12 Chas. 2. c. 24) from 10 May 1750, providing that from then the excise office would be kept open from 8am till 2pm.

Section 13 of the act provided that after 24 June 1750, anyone who steals, pulls up, or destroys turnips growing on private lands shall, upon conviction before justices of the peace, for the first offense make satisfaction to the owner for damages, pay up to ten shillings to the parish poor, and if unable to pay, be committed to the house of correction for up to one month or be whipped. For a second offense, offenders would be committed to the house of correction for three months.

Section 14 of the act provided that no person would be prosecuted for stealing, pulling up, or destroying turnips unless the prosecution is begun within thirty days after the offense was committed.

Section 15 of the act provided that after 2 May 1750, any person already sworn and enrolled as a solicitor in any court of equity at Westminster may be sworn, admitted, and enrolled as an attorney in King's Bench or Common Pleas without paying any fees for the oath or stamp, if the judges, upon examining the solicitor's fitness and capacity, are satisfied that such solicitor is duly qualified to act as an attorney, pursuant to the Attorneys and Solicitors Act 1728 (2 Geo. 2. c. 23).

== Subsequent developments ==
So much of the act "as relates to the preventing the stealing or destroying of Turnips; and for the more effectually preventing the stealing or destroying of Turnips, Potatoes, Cabbages, Parsnips, Pease, and Carrots" was repealed by section 1 of the Stealing of Vegetables Act 1772 (13 Geo. 3. c. 32).

So much of the act as related to attornies and solicitors was repealed by section 1 of, and the first part of the first schedule to, the Solicitors Act 1843 (6 & 7 Vict. c. 73), which came into force on 22 August 1843.

Sections 7, 8 and 9 of the act was repealed by section 39 of, and the schedule to, the Salmon Fishery Act 1861 (24 & 25 Vict. c. 109), which came into force on 1 October 1861.

The Select Committee on Temporary Laws, Expired or Expiring, appointed in 1796, inspected and considered all temporary laws, observing irregularities in the construction of expiring laws continuance acts, making recommendations and emphasising the importance of the Committee for Expired and Expiring Laws.

The whole act was repealed by section 1 of, and the schedule to, the Statute Law Revision Act 1867 (30 & 31 Vict. c. 59), which came into force on 15 July 1867.
