= Continuance of Laws, etc. Act 1757 =

Act of the Parliament of Great Britain

- Act of Parliament
- Parliament of Great Britain
- Long title: An Act for continuing certain Laws made in the last Session of Parliament, for prohibiting the Exportation of Corn, Malt, Meal, Flour, Bread, Biscuit, and Starch; and for prohibiting the making of Low Wines and Spirits from Wheat, Barley, Malt, or any other Sort of Grain, or from Meal or Flour; and to allow the Transportation of Wheat, Barley, Oats, Meal, and Flour, to The Isle of Man, for the Use of the Inhabitants there; and for reviving and continuing an Act made in the same Session, for discontinuing the Duties upon Corn and Flour imported, and upon Corn, Grain, Meal, Bread, Biscuit, and Flour, taken from the Enemy; and to permit the Importation of Corn and Flour into Great Britain and Ireland in Neutral Ships; and to authorize His Majesty, with the Advice of His Privy Council, to order and permit the Exportation of such Quantities of the Commodities aforesaid as may be necessary for the Sustentation of any Forces in the Pay of Great Britain, or of those of His Majesty's Allies acting in Support of the common Cause; and to prohibit the Payment of any Bounty upon the Exportation of any of the said Commodities to be made during the Continuance of this Act.
- Citation: 31 Geo. 2. c. 1
- Territorial extent: Great Britain

Dates
- Royal assent: 9 December 1757
- Commencement: 1 December 1757 (Note: Start of session.)
- Repealed: 15 July 1867
Other legislation
Amends	See § Continued enactments
Repealed by	Statute Law Revision Act 1867
Relates to	See Expiring laws continuance acts

Status: Repealed

Text of statute as originally enacted

The Continuance of Laws, etc. Act 1757 (31 Geo. 2. c. 1) was an act of the Parliament of Great Britain that continued various older enactments.

== Background ==
In the United Kingdom, acts of Parliament remain in force until expressly repealed. Many acts of parliament, however, contained time-limited sunset clauses, requiring legislation to revive enactments that had expired or to continue enactments that would otherwise expire.

== Provisions ==
=== Continued enactments ===
Section 1 of the act continued the Exportation Act 1757 (30 Geo. 2. c. 1) and the Distillation Act 1757 (c. 10), from the expiration of those acts until the end of the next session of parliament after 24 December 1758.

Section 2 of the act provided that corn, malt, meal, flour, biscuit, and starch could only be exported from the ports of Southampton or Exeter to the Isle of Man, with exporters required to provide sufficient security and obtain proper certification before loading such commodities, and established quantity limits not to exceed 2,500 quarters from Southampton and Exeter within any 20-day period.

Section 3 of the act continued the Discontinuance of Duties Act 1757 (30 Geo. 2. c. 7) from the expiration of the act until the end of the next session of parliament after 24 December 1758.

Section 4 of the act provided that corn and flour could be imported duty-free into Great Britain from any ships or vessels belonging to Great Britain or allied kingdoms or states, and that such imports into Ireland would be lawful until 24 December 1758 from ships belonging to any kingdom or state in amity with his Majesty, notwithstanding any contrary acts of parliament.

Section 5 of the act provided that in case of exigency, the King may lawfully permit corn and other commodities to be exported from Great Britain or Ireland, with the advice of his privy council, for the supply and sustentation of forces in his Majesty's pay or those of his allies acting in support of the common cause, in such quantities as shall be necessary for that purpose and in such manner as his Majesty shall think fit to direct.

Section 6 of the act provided that during the continuance of the act, no bounty or bounties granted by any law upon the exportation of corn and other commodities before-mentioned shall be paid on exportation thereof out of this kingdom to any place whatsoever, or by whatever authority the same may be exported, notwithstanding any other act of parliament to the contrary.

== Subsequent developments ==
The Select Committee on Temporary Laws, Expired or Expiring, appointed in 1796, inspected and considered all temporary laws, observing irregularities in the construction of expiring laws continuance acts, making recommendations and emphasising the importance of the Committee for Expired and Expiring Laws.

The whole act was repealed by section 1 of, and the schedule to, the Statute Law Revision Act 1867 (30 & 31 Vict. c. 59), which came into force on 15 July 1867.
