= List of acts of the Parliament of Great Britain from 1779 =

This is a complete list of acts of the Parliament of Great Britain for the year 1779.

For acts passed until 1707, see the list of acts of the Parliament of England and the list of acts of the Parliament of Scotland. See also the list of acts of the Parliament of Ireland.

For acts passed from 1801 onwards, see the list of acts of the Parliament of the United Kingdom. For acts of the devolved parliaments and assemblies in the United Kingdom, see the list of acts of the Scottish Parliament, the list of acts of the Northern Ireland Assembly, and the list of acts and measures of Senedd Cymru; see also the list of acts of the Parliament of Northern Ireland.

The number shown after each act's title is its chapter number. Acts are cited using this number, preceded by the year(s) of the reign during which the relevant parliamentary session was held; thus the Union with Ireland Act 1800 is cited as "39 & 40 Geo. 3. c. 67", meaning the 67th act passed during the session that started in the 39th year of the reign of George III and which finished in the 40th year of that reign. Note that the modern convention is to use Arabic numerals in citations (thus "41 Geo. 3" rather than "41 Geo. III"). Acts of the last session of the Parliament of Great Britain and the first session of the Parliament of the United Kingdom are both cited as "41 Geo. 3".

Acts passed by the Parliament of Great Britain did not have a short title; however, some of these acts have subsequently been given a short title by acts of the Parliament of the United Kingdom (such as the Short Titles Act 1896).

Before the Acts of Parliament (Commencement) Act 1793 came into force on 8 April 1793, acts passed by the Parliament of Great Britain were deemed to have come into effect on the first day of the session in which they were passed. Because of this, the years given in the list below may in fact be the year before a particular act was passed.

== 19 Geo. 3 ==
The fifth session of the 14th Parliament of Great Britain, which met from 26 November 1778 until 3 July 1779.

This session was also traditionally cited as 19 G. 3.

=== Public acts ===
Short title	Citation	Royal assent
Long title
Habeas Corpus Suspension Act 1779 (repealed)	19 Geo. 3. c. 1	16 December 1778
An Act for further continuing an Act, made in the Seventeenth Year of the Reign of His present Majesty, intituled, "An Act to empower His Majesty to secure and detain Persons charged with, or suspected of, the Crime of High Treason, committed in any of His Majesty's Colonies or Plantations in America, or on the High Seas, or the Crime of Piracy." (Note: Habeas Corpus Suspension Act 1776 (17 Geo. 3. c. 9)) (Repealed by Statute Law Revision Act 1871 (34 & 35 Vict. c. 116))
Land Tax Act 1779 (repealed)	19 Geo. 3. c. 2	16 December 1778
An Act for granting an Aid to His Majesty by a Land Tax, to be raised in Great Britain, for the Service of the Year One thousand seven hundred and seventy-nine. (Repealed by Statute Law Revision Act 1871 (34 & 35 Vict. c. 116))
Malt Duties Act 1779 (repealed)	19 Geo. 3. c. 3	16 December 1778
An Act for continuing and granting to His Majesty certain Duties upon Malt, Mum, Cyder and Perry, for the Service of the Year One thousand seven hundred and seventy-nine. (Repealed by Statute Law Revision Act 1871 (34 & 35 Vict. c. 116))
Customs Act 1779 (repealed)	19 Geo. 3. c. 4	24 December 1778
An Act for granting further Time for allowing the Drawback upon the Exportation of certain Muslins, Callicoes and Coffee. (Repealed by Statute Law Revision Act 1871 (34 & 35 Vict. c. 116))
Prize Act 1779 (repealed)	19 Geo. 3. c. 5	24 December 1778
An Act for granting Relief to the Captors of Prizes, with respect to bringing and, landing certain French Prizes in this Kingdom. (Repealed by Naval Prize Acts Repeal Act 1864 (27 & 28 Vict. c. 23))
Court-martial on Admiral Keppel Act 1779 (repealed)	19 Geo. 3. c. 6	24 December 1778
An Act to authorize the Lord High Admiral, or the Commissioners for executing the Office of Lord High Admiral for the Time being, to order any Court Martial which may be appointed on the Charge of Vice Admiral Sir Hugh Palliser against the Honourable Admiral Augustus Keppel, to be holden on Shore. (Repealed by Statute Law Revision Act 1871 (34 & 35 Vict. c. 116))
Macclesfield Church Act 1779	19 Geo. 3. c. 7	24 December 1778
An Act for making the Church or Chapel erected by Charles Roe Esquire, in the Town of Macclesfield, in the County Palatine of Chester, a perpetual Cure and Benefice; and for endowing the same, and vesting the Right of Nomination or Presentation thereof, in the said Charles Roe, his Heirs and Assigns; and for other Purposes.
Marine Mutiny Act 1779 (repealed)	19 Geo. 3. c. 8	9 February 1779
An Act for the Regulation of His Majesty's Marine Forces while on Shore. (Repealed by Statute Law Revision Act 1871 (34 & 35 Vict. c. 116))
Importation of Silk Act 1779 (repealed)	19 Geo. 3. c. 9	9 February 1779
An Act for allowing the Importation of fine organzined Italian thrown Silk, in any Ships or Vessels, for a limited Time. (Repealed by Statute Law Revision Act 1871 (34 & 35 Vict. c. 116))
Recruiting Act 1779 (repealed)	19 Geo. 3. c. 10	9 February 1779
An Act for repealing an Act made in the last Session of Parliament, intituled, "An Act for the more easy and better recruiting of His Majesty's Land Forces and Marines;" (Note: Recruiting Act 1778 (18 Geo. 3. c. 53)) and for substituting other and more effectual Provisions in the Place thereof. (Repealed by Statute Law Revision Act 1871 (34 & 35 Vict. c. 116))
Leeds Coal Supply Act 1779 (repealed)	19 Geo. 3. c. 11	16 March 1779
An Act for rendering more beneficial an Act made in the Thirty-first Year of the Reign of King George the Second, intituled, "An Act for establishing Agreements made between Charles Brandling Esquire, and other Persons, Proprietors of Lands, for laying down a Waggon Way, in order for the better supplying the Town and Neighbourhood of Leeds, in the County of York, with Coals," (Note: Middleton Railway Act 1757 (31 Geo. 2. c. 22 Pr.)) by enabling the said Charles Brandling to supply annually a larger Quantity of Coals to and for the Use of the said Town and Neighbourhood; and for regulating the Prices of carrying Coals from the Repository at Casson Close. (Repealed by Statute Law (Repeals) Act 1978 (c. 45))
Linlithgow Roads and Bridges Act 1779 (repealed)	19 Geo. 3. c. 12	9 February 1779
An Act for repairing the Highways and Bridges in the County of Linlithgow and Bathgate. (Repealed by Roads and Bridges (Scotland) Act 1878 (41 & 42 Vict. c. 51) and Local Government (Scotland) Act 1889 (52 & 53 Vict. c. 50))
Hartsmere, etc., Suffolk (Poor Relief) Act 1779 (repealed)	19 Geo. 3. c. 13	16 March 1779
An Act for the better Relief and Employment of the Poor, within the several Hundreds of Hartsmere, Hoxne and Thredling, in the County of Suffolk. (Repealed by Statute Law (Repeals) Act 2013 (c. 2))
Navigation Act 1779 (repealed)	19 Geo. 3. c. 14	16 March 1779
An Act for the better Supply of Mariners and Seamen, to serve in His Majesty's Ships of War, and on board Merchant Ships, and other Trading Ships and Vessels. (Repealed by Statute Law Revision Act 1871 (34 & 35 Vict. c. 116))
Madhouses Act 1779 (repealed)	19 Geo. 3. c. 15	16 March 1779
An Act to continue an Act made in the Fourteenth Year of the Reign of His present Majesty, intituled, "An Act for regulating Madhouses," (Note: Madhouses Act 1774 (14 Geo. 3. c. 49)) for a further Time therein limited. (Repealed by Madhouse Act 1828 (9 Geo. 4. c. 41))
Mutiny Act 1779 (repealed)	19 Geo. 3. c. 16	16 March 1779
An Act for punishing Mutiny and Desertion; and for the better Payment of the Army and their Quarters. (Repealed by Statute Law Revision Act 1871 (34 & 35 Vict. c. 116))
Naval Courts-martial Act 1779 (repealed)	19 Geo. 3. c. 17	16 March 1779
An Act to explain and amend an Act made in the Twenty-second Year of the Reign of His late Majesty King George the Second, intituled, "An Act for amending, explaining and reducing into One Act of Parliament, the Laws relating to the Government of His Majesty's Ships, Vessels and Forces by Sea." (Note: Navy Act 1748 (22 Geo. 2. c. 33)) (Repealed by Naval Discipline Act 1860 (23 & 24 Vict. c. 123))
National Debt Act 1779 (repealed)	19 Geo. 3. c. 18	16 March 1779
An Act for raising a certain Sum of Money by way of Annuities; and for establishing a Lottery. (Repealed by Statute Law Revision Act 1870 (33 & 34 Vict. c. 69))
Militia Pay Act 1779 (repealed)	19 Geo. 3. c. 19	1 April 1779
An Act for defraying the Charge of the Pay and Cloathing of the Militia in that Part of Great Britain called England for One Year, beginning the Twenty-fifth Day of March One thousand seven hundred and seventy-nine. (Repealed by Statute Law Revision Act 1871 (34 & 35 Vict. c. 116))
Ministers' Widows Fund (Scotland) Act 1779 (repealed)	19 Geo. 3. c. 20	16 March 1779
An Act for the better raising and securing a Fund for a Provision for the Widows and Children of the Ministers of the Church of Scotland, and of the Heads, Principals and Masters in the Universities of Saint Andrews, Glasgow, Edinburgh and Aberdeen; and for repealing Two Acts made in the Seventeenth (Note: Ministers' Widows Fund (Scotland) Act 1743 (17 Geo. 2. c. 11)) and Twenty-second (Note: Ministers' Widows Fund (Scotland) Act 1748 (22 Geo. 2. c. 21)) Years of the Reign of His late Majesty King George the Second, for those Purposes. (Repealed by Church of Scotland Ministers' and Scottish University Professors' Widows' Fund Order Confirmation Act 1923 (13 & 14 Geo. 5. c. lxv))
Lottery Office Keepers Act 1779 (repealed)	19 Geo. 3. c. 21	1 April 1779
An Act for licensing and regulating Lottery Office Keepers. (Repealed by Statute Law Revision Act 1861 (24 & 25 Vict. c. 101))
Continuance of Laws Act 1779 (repealed)	19 Geo. 3. c. 22	1 April 1779
An Act to continue several Laws relating to the giving further Encouragement for the Importation of Naval Stores from the British Colonies in America; to the landing of Rum or Spirits of the British Sugar Plantations, before Payment of the Duties of Excise; to the discontinuing the Duties payable upon the Importation of Tallow, Hogs Lard and Grease; to the regulating the Fees of Officers of the Customs and Naval Officers in America; to the allowing the Exportation of certain Quantities of Wheat, and other Articles, to His Majesty's Sugar Colonies in America; and to the allowing a Drawback of the Duties on Rum, shipped as Stores, to be consumed on board Merchant Ships on their Voyages. (Repealed by Customs Law Repeal Act 1825 (6 Geo. 4. c. 105))
Bath Hospital Act 1779	19 Geo. 3. c. 23	1 April 1779
An Act more effectually to enable the President and Governors of the Hospital or Infirmary at Bath, established by an Act passed in the Twelfth Year of the Reign of His late Majesty King George the Second, intituled, "An Act for establishing and well governing an Hospital or Infirmary in the City of Bath," (Note: Bath Hospital Act 1738 (12 Geo. 2. c. 31)) to take or acquire, and hold any Lands, Tenements or Hereditaments, or any Interest in Lands, Tenements or Hereditaments, and any Money or Personal Property to be laid out in Lands, Tenements or Hereditaments, pursuant to any Will, or otherwise, to the Amount limited in the said Act.
Bedford Level (Drainage) Act 1779	19 Geo. 3. c. 24	1 April 1779
An Act for charging the Lands within the North Level, Part of the Great Level of the Fens called Bedford Level, and divers Lands adjoining thereto, in the Manor of Crowland, with further Taxes for a limited Time, for discharging the Debts incurred by the Commissioners under an Act of the Twenty-seventh Year of King George the Second; (Note: Bedford Level Act 1754 (27 Geo. 2. c. 19)) and for better supporting and preserving the Drainage of the said Lands.
Taxation Act 1779 (repealed)	19 Geo. 3. c. 25	1 April 1779
An Act for granting to His Majesty additional Duties upon the Produce of the several Duties under the Management of the respective Commissioners of the Customs and Excise in Great Britain. (Repealed by Statute Law Revision Act 1861 (24 & 25 Vict. c. 101))
White Herring Fishery Act 1779 (repealed)	19 Geo. 3. c. 26	1 April 1779
An Act to continue and amend an Act made in the Eleventh Year of His present Majesty's Reign, intituled, "An Act for the Encouragement of the White Herring Fishery." (Note: White Herring Fisheries Act 1771 (11 Geo. 3. c. 31)) (Repealed by Sea Fisheries Act 1868 (31 & 32 Vict. c. 45))
Bounties Act 1779 (repealed)	19 Geo. 3. c. 27	1 April 1779
An Act for further continuing and extending the Provisions of Two Acts, made in the Twenty-ninth Year of the Reign of His late Majesty King George the Second, (Note: Exportation Act 1756 (29 Geo. 2. c. 15)) and in the Tenth Year of the Reign of His present Majesty, (Note: Exportation (No. 4) Act 1770 (10 Geo. 3. c. 38)) for granting a Bounty on certain Species of British and Irish Linens exported, and taking off the Duties on the Importation of Foreign Raw Linen Yarns made of Flax; and for granting a Bounty on the Exportation of British Chequed and Striped Linens, and upon British and Irish Diapers, Huckabacks, Sheeting and other Linen, of above a certain Breadth. (Repealed by Statute Law Revision Act 1871 (34 & 35 Vict. c. 116))
Importation Act 1779 (repealed)	19 Geo. 3. c. 28	1 April 1779
An Act to permit, during the present Hostilities with France, certain Goods enumerated in the Act of Navigation, (Note: Navigation Act 1660 (12 Cha. 2. c. 18)) to be imported in British-built Ships sold to Foreigners; and for releasing Ships and Goods which have been seized in pursuance of the said Act. (Repealed by Statute Law Revision Act 1871 (34 & 35 Vict. c. 116))
Customs (No. 2) Act 1779 (repealed)	19 Geo. 3. c. 29	1 April 1779
An Act for allowing Corn, Grain and Flour imported into the Port of Cowes in the Isle of Wight, to be landed without Payment of the Duties, under the like Restrictions as Corn, Grain and Flour are allowed to be landed at the several Ports mentioned in an Act, made in the Thirteenth Year of His present Majesty's Reign, intituled, "An Act to regulate the Importation and Exportation of Corn." (Note: Corn Act 1772 (13 Geo. 3. c. 43)) (Repealed by Statute Law Revision Act 1861 (24 & 25 Vict. c. 101))
Cosford, Suffolk (Poor Relief) Act 1779 (repealed)	19 Geo. 3. c. 30	1 April 1779
An Act for the better Relief and Employment of the Poor of the several Parishes within the Hundred of Cosford (except the Parish of Hadleigh) and also of the Parish of Polsted, within the Hundred of Babergh, in the County of Suffolk. (Repealed by Statute Law Revision Act 1948 (11 & 12 Geo. 6. c. 62))
Wells, Somerset (Improvement) Act 1779 (repealed)	19 Geo. 3. c. 31	1 April 1779
An Act for building a new Assize or Town Hall and Market House, within the City or Borough of Wells, in the County of Somerset; and for regulating the Markets within the said City or Borough. (Repealed by Wells (Somerset) Markets Act 1841 (4 & 5 Vict. c. xlv))
Somerset Roads Act 1779 (repealed)	19 Geo. 3. c. 32	1 April 1779
An Act for continuing and amending Two Acts, made in the Twenty-sixth Year of His late Majesty, (Note: Wells Roads Act 1753 (26 Geo. 2. c. 76)) and the Fourth Year of His present Majesty, (Note: Somerset Roads Act 1764 (4 Geo. 3. c. 77)) for repairing the Road from Piper's Inn to Glastonbury, and several other Roads therein mentioned, in the County of Somerset; and for repairing the Road from Piper's Inn aforesaid, to Athelney Bridge; and also for paving, cleansing and lighting the City or Borough of Wells, in the said County, and for removing and preventing Encroachments, Nuisances and Annoyances therein. (Repealed by Taunton Roads Act 1799 (39 Geo. 3. c. xxxviii) and Wells (Somerset) Roads and Improvement Act 1821 (1 & 2 Geo. 4. c. xii))
Lancaster (Drainage) Act 1779 or the Alt Drainage Act 1779 (repealed)	19 Geo. 3. c. 33	1 April 1779
An Act for draining, improving and preserving the Low Lands in the Parishes of Altcar, Sefton, Halsall and Walton upon the Hill, in the County Palatine of Lancaster. (Repealed by Lancashire County Council (Drainage) Act 1921 (11 & 12 Geo. 5. c. lxxxviii))
Swaffham (Drainage) Act 1779 (repealed)	19 Geo. 3. c. 34	18 May 1779
An Act to explain, amend and render more effectual, an Act passed in the Seventh Year of His present Majesty's Reign, intituled, "Act for draining and preserving certain Fen Lands and Low Grounds, lying in the South Level, Part of the Great Level of the Fens commonly called Bedford Level, and in the County of Cambridge, between the River Cam, otherwise Grant, West, and the Hard Lands of Bottisham, Swassham, Bulbeck and Swaffham Prior, East; and for empowering the Governor, Bailiffs and Commonalty of the Company of Conservators of the Great Level of the Fens commonly called Bedford Level, to sell certain Fen Lands, lying within the Limits aforesaid, commonly called Invested Lands." (Note: Bedford Level and Swaffham Drainage Act 1767 (7 Geo. 3. c. 53)) (Repealed by Bedford Level Drainage Act 1819 (59 Geo. 3. c. lxxviii) and Swaffham Drainage Act 1853 (16 & 17 Vict. c. lxi))
Tobacco Act 1779 (repealed)	19 Geo. 3. c. 35	18 May 1779
An Act to repeal so much of several Acts of Parliament, as prohibit the Growth and Produce of Tobacco in Ireland; and to permit the Importation of Tobacco of the Growth and Produce of that Kingdom into Great Britain, under the like Duties and Regulations, as Tobacco of the Growth of the British Colonies in America is permitted to be imported. (Repealed by Tobacco Cultivation Act 1831 (1 & 2 Will. 4. c. 13))
Bridgwater Markets Act 1779 (repealed)	19 Geo. 3. c. 36	18 May 1779
An Act for erecting a Market House and regulating the Markets, within the Borough of Bridgewater, in the County of Somerset; and for paving, cleansing, lighting and watching the Streets, Lanes and other publick Passages and Places, within the said Borough. (Repealed by Bridgwater Improvement Act 1826 (7 Geo. 4. c. vii))
Bounty on Hemp Act 1779 (repealed)	19 Geo. 3. c. 37	18 May 1779
An Act for granting a Bounty upon the Importation into this Kingdom of Hemp, of the Growth of the Kingdom of Ireland, for a limited Time. (Repealed by Statute Law Revision Act 1871 (34 & 35 Vict. c. 116))
Exchequer Court (Scotland) Act 1779 (repealed)	19 Geo. 3. c. 38	18 May 1779
An Act for altering the Times of holding the Martinmas and Candlemas Terms, in the Court of Exchequer in Scotland. (Repealed by Statute Law Revision Act 1871 (34 & 35 Vict. c. 116))
Burton-on-Trent (Improvement) Act 1779 (repealed)	19 Geo. 3. c. 39	18 May 1779
An Act for paving, repairing, cleansing and lighting the Town and Borough of Burton-upon-Trent, in the County of Stafford; and for removing and preventing Obstructions and Annoyances therein. (Repealed by Town of Burton-upon-Trent Act 1853 (16 & 17 Vict. c. cxviii))
Duties on Starch Act 1779 (repealed)	19 Geo. 3. c. 40	18 May 1779
An Act for better securing the Duties on Starch. (Repealed by Statute Law Revision Act 1861 (24 & 25 Vict. c. 101))
Customs (No. 3) Act 1779 (repealed)	19 Geo. 3. c. 41	18 May 1779
An Act for granting a Drawback of the Duties, imposed by an Act of the last Session of Parliament, (Note: Customs (No. 3) Act 1778 (18 Geo. 3. c. 27)) upon all foreign Wines exported from Great Britain to any British Colony or Plantation in America, or to any British Settlement in the East Indies. (Repealed by Statute Law Revision Act 1861 (24 & 25 Vict. c. 101))
Worcester Bridge Act 1779	19 Geo. 3. c. 42	18 May 1779
An Act to enable the Trustees for putting in Execution an Act of the Ninth Year of the Reign of His present Majesty, (Note: Worcester Bridge Act 1769 (9 Geo. 3. c. 84)) for building a Bridge at Worcester over the River Severn, and for opening convenient Avenues to the said Bridge, to finish and complete the said Bridge, and to carry the Purposes of the said Act into Execution.
Lincolnshire (Small Debts) Act 1779 (repealed)	19 Geo. 3. c. 43	18 May 1779
An Act for the more easy and speedy Recovery of Small Debts, within the Soake of Horncastle and Wapentakes of Wraggoe and Gartree, (except the Parish of Great Sturton) and within the Wapentakes of Louth Eske, Ludborough and Calceworth, and Parishes of Wrangle, Leake, Leverton, Benington, Butterwick, Freiston and Fishtost, in the Hundred of Skirbeck, in the County of Lincoln. (Repealed by Boston (Lincolnshire) Court of Requests Act 1807 (47 Geo. 3 Sess. 2. c. i), Bolingbroke, &c. Court of Requests Act 1807 (47 Geo. 3 Sess. 2. c. lxxviii) and County Courts Act 1846 (9 & 10 Vict. c. 95))
Nonconformist Relief Act 1779 (repealed)	19 Geo. 3. c. 44	18 May 1779
An Act for the further Relief of Protestant Dissenting Ministers and School-masters. (Repealed by Promissory Oaths Act 1871 (34 & 35 Vict. c. 48), Statute Law Revision Act 1888 (51 & 52 Vict. c. 3), Territorial Army and Militia Act 1921 (11 & 12 Geo. 5. c. 37) and Statute Law (Repeals) Act 1969 (c. 52))
Duchy of Lancaster Act 1779	19 Geo. 3. c. 45	18 May 1779
An Act to enable the Chancellor and Council of the Duchy of Lancaster, to sell and dispose of certain Fee Farm Rents, and other Rents, and to enfranchise Copyhold and Customary Tenements, within their Survey, and to encourage the Growth of Timber on Lands held of the said Duchy.
Pembroke Gaol Act 1779 (repealed)	19 Geo. 3. c. 46	18 May 1779
An Act for Building a new Gaol and House of Correction for the County of Pembroke. (Repealed by Statute Law (Repeals) Act 2008 (c. 12))
Indemnity Act 1779 (repealed)	19 Geo. 3. c. 47	31 May 1779
An Act to indemnify such Persons as have omitted to qualify themselves for Offices and Employments; and to indemnify Justices of the Peace, or others, who have omitted to register or deliver in their Qualifications within the Time limited by Law, and for giving further Time for those Purposes; and to indemnify Members and Officers in Cities, Corporations and Borough Towns, whose Admissions have been omitted to be stamped according to Law, or having been stamped have been lost or mislaid, and for allowing them Time to provide Admissions duly stamped; and to give further Time to such Persons as have omitted to make and file Affidavits of the Execution of Indentures of Clerks to Attornies and Solicitors. (Repealed by Promissory Oaths Act 1871 (34 & 35 Vict. c. 48))
Shipping and Navigation Act 1779 (repealed)	19 Geo. 3. c. 48	31 May 1779
An Act to explain so much of an Act, made in the Twelfth Year of the Reign of King Charles the Second, intituled, "An Act for the encouraging and encreasing of Shipping and Navigation," (Note: Navigation Act 1660 (12 Cha. 2. c. 18)) as relates to the Importation into this Kingdom, and other His Majesty's Dominions, of Goods and Commodities of the Growth or Production of Africa, Asia or America, which are manufactured in foreign Parts; for preventing Masters of Ships removing their Vessels out of the Stream, except to the lawful Quays, in the Port of London, before the Goods are discharged, or their Vessels are cleared by the proper Officers inwards or outwards; and for allowing the Officers of the Customs and Excise to make use of Lights on board Ships in the Haven, Dock or Bason, at the Port of Kingston upon Hull. (Repealed by Statute Law Revision Act 1861 (24 & 25 Vict. c. 101))
Payment of Lace Makers' Wages Act 1779 (repealed)	19 Geo. 3. c. 49	31 May 1779
An Act to prevent Abuses in the Payment of Wages, to Persons employed in the Bone and Thread Lace Manufactory. (Repealed by Conspiracy and Protection of Property Act 1875 (38 & 39 Vict. c. 86))
Distillers Act 1779 (repealed)	19 Geo. 3. c. 50	31 May 1779
An Act for more effectually preventing Frauds by private Distillers, and for the better securing the Duties on Low Wines and Spirits. (Repealed by Statute Law Revision Act 1861 (24 & 25 Vict. c. 101))
Taxation (No. 2) Act 1779 (repealed)	19 Geo. 3. c. 51	31 May 1779
An Act for granting to His Majesty certain Duties on Licences to be taken out by all Persons letting Horses to hire for travelling in the Manner therein mentioned; and certain Duties on all Horses let to hire for the Purposes of travelling Post, and by Time; and upon certain Carriages therein mentioned. (Repealed by Statute Law Revision Act 1861 (24 & 25 Vict. c. 101))
Taxation (No. 3) Act 1779 (repealed)	19 Geo. 3. c. 52	31 May 1779
An Act for taking off the Duty upon all Salt used in the curing of Pilchards, and laying a proportionable Duty upon all Pilchards consumed at Home only. (Repealed by Statute Law Revision Act 1861 (24 & 25 Vict. c. 101))
Taxation (No. 4) Act 1779 (repealed)	19 Geo. 3. c. 53	31 May 1779
An Act for discontinuing the Duties on Cotton-Wool, the Growth and Product of the British Colonies or Plantations in America, exported from this Kingdom. (Repealed by Statute Law Revision Act 1861 (24 & 25 Vict. c. 101))
Criminal Law Act 1779 (repealed)	19 Geo. 3. c. 54	31 May 1779
An Act for further continuing, for a limited Time, an Act made in the Sixteenth Year of the Reign of His present Majesty, intituled, "An Act to authorize, for a limited Time, the Punishment, by hard Labour, of Offenders, who for certain Crimes are or shall become liable to be transported to any of His Majesty's Colonies and Plantations." (Note: Criminal Law Act 1776 (16 Geo. 3. c. 43)) (Repealed by Statute Law Revision Act 1871 (34 & 35 Vict. c. 116) (Note: Incorrectly cited as the Statute Law Revision Act 1861 (24 & 25 Vict. c. 101) in the Chronological Table of the Statutes.))
First Meetings of Commissioners, etc. Act 1779 (repealed)	19 Geo. 3. c. 55	17 June 1779
An Act for enlarging the Times appointed for the Meetings of Commissioners or Trustees, for putting in Execution certain Acts of this Session of Parliament. (Repealed by Statute Law Revision Act 1871 (34 & 35 Vict. c. 116))
Auction Duties, etc. Act 1779 (repealed)	19 Geo. 3. c. 56	17 June 1779
An Act for altering, amending and enforcing so much of an Act, made in the Seventeenth Year of the Reign of His present Majesty, intituled, "An Act for granting to His Majesty certain Duties on Licences to be taken out by all Persons acting as Auctioneers; and certain Rates and Duties on all Lands, Houses, Goods and other Things sold by Auction; and upon Indentures, Leases, Bonds, Deeds and other Instruments," (Note: Auctioneers' Licences Act 1776 (17 Geo. 3. c. 50)) as relates to the Method of granting Licences to Auctioneers, and to the collecting the Duties on Estates and Goods sold by Auction. (Repealed by Statute Law Revision Act 1861 (24 & 25 Vict. c. 101))
Parish of the Trinity, Coventry Act 1779 (repealed)	19 Geo. 3. c. 57	31 May 1779
An Act for the better providing of a Maintenance for the Vicar of the Parish of the Trinity, in the City of Coventry. (Repealed by Holy Trinity, Coventry (Vicar's Rate) Act 1883 (46 & 47 Vict. c. cxxiv) (Note: Incorrectly cited as "46-7 V c xxiv" in the Chronological Table of the Statutes.))
River Lee Navigation Act 1779 or the Lee Navigation Improvement Act 1779	19 Geo. 3. c. 58	31 May 1779
An Act for preserving the Navigation of the River Lee, in the Counties of Hertford, Essex and Middlesex.
Duties on Houses, etc. Act 1779 (repealed)	19 Geo. 3. c. 59	17 June 1779
An Act for repealing the Duties on all inhabited Houses, imposed by an Act made in the last Session of Parliament, (Note: House Duty Act 1778 (18 Geo. 3. c. 26)) and for granting to His Majesty other Duties upon all inhabited Houses in Great Britain, and for amending the said Act; and also for amending so much of an Act, made in the Seventeenth Year of the Reign of His present Majesty, (Note: Taxation (No. 2) Act 1776 (17 Geo. 3. c. 39)) as imposes a Duty upon all Servants retained or employed in the several Capacities therein mentioned. (Repealed by House Tax Act 1803 (43 Geo. 3. c. 161))
Tithes (Coventry) Act 1779 (repealed)	19 Geo. 3. c. 60	31 May 1779
An Act for establishing certain Payments to be made to the Vicar of the Parish of Saint Michael, in the City of Coventry, for the Time being, in lieu of Tythes; and for repealing so much of an Act of the Fourth and Fifth of Philip and Mary, (Note: Tithes (Coventry) Act 1557 (4 & 5 Ph. & M. c. 5 Pr.)) as relates to the Payment of Tythes in the said Parish. (Repealed by Coventry Corporation Act 1900 (63 & 64 Vict. c. cclxii))
East India Company Act 1779 (repealed)	19 Geo. 3. c. 61	17 June 1779
An Act for continuing in the Possession of the United Company of Merchants of England trading to the East Indies, for a limited Time, and under certain Conditions, the Territorial Acquisitions and Revenues lately obtained in the East Indies; and for continuing, for a limited Time, so much of an Act, made in the Thirteenth Year of the Reign of His present Majesty, intituled, "An Act for establishing certain Regulations for the better Management of the Affairs of the East India Company, as well in India as in Europe," (Note: East India Company Act 1772 (13 Geo. 3. c. 63)) as will expire in the Course of the present Year. (Repealed by Statute Law Revision Act 1871 (34 & 35 Vict. c. 116))
Customs (No. 4) Act 1779 (repealed)	19 Geo. 3. c. 62	17 June 1779
An Act to permit the Removal of Lime, and other Articles necessary for the Improvement of Land, without Cocquet or Bond. (Repealed by Customs Law Repeal Act 1825 (6 Geo. 4. c. 105))
Loans or Exchequer Bills Act 1779 (repealed)	19 Geo. 3. c. 63	17 June 1779
An Act for raising a certain Sum of Money by Loans or Exchequer Bills, for the Service of the Year One thousand seven hundred and seventy-nine. (Repealed by Statute Law Revision Act 1871 (34 & 35 Vict. c. 116))
Loans or Exchequer Bills (No. 2) Act 1779 (repealed)	19 Geo. 3. c. 64	17 June 1779
An Act for raising a further Sum of Money by Loans or Exchequer Bills, for the Service of the Year One thousand seven hundred and seventy-nine. (Repealed by Statute Law Revision Act 1871 (34 & 35 Vict. c. 116))
Salaries of Judges Act 1779 (repealed)	19 Geo. 3. c. 65	17 June 1779
An Act for the further Augmentation of the Salaries of the Puisne Justices of the Courts of King's Bench and Common Pleas, and of the Barons of the Coif of the Court of Exchequer at Westminster. (Repealed by Statute Law Revision Act 1861 (24 & 25 Vict. c. 101))
Stamp Duties Act 1779 (repealed)	19 Geo. 3. c. 66	17 June 1779
An Act for granting to His Majesty several additional Duties on Stamped Vellum, Parchment and Paper; and for better securing the Stamp Duties upon Indentures, Leases, Deeds and other Instruments. (Repealed by Statute Law Revision Act 1861 (24 & 25 Vict. c. 101))
Navy Act 1779 (repealed)	19 Geo. 3. c. 67	17 June 1779
An Act for the Encouragement of Seamen, and the more speedy and effectual Manning His Majesty's Navy. (Repealed by Naval Prize Acts Repeal Act 1864 (27 & 28 Vict. c. 23))
Small Debts (Tower Hamlets) Act 1779 (repealed)	19 Geo. 3. c. 68	31 May 1779
An Act for explaining, amending and rendering more effectual, an Act passed in the Twenty-third Year of the Reign of His late Majesty King George the Second, (Note: Small Debts (Tower Hamlets) Act 1749 (23 Geo. 2. c. 30)) for the more easy and speedy Recovery of Small Debts within the Tower Hamlets. (Repealed by County Courts Act 1846 (9 & 10 Vict. c. 95))
Smuggling, etc. Act 1779 (repealed)	19 Geo. 3. c. 69	17 June 1779
An Act for the more effectually preventing the pernicious Practices of Smuggling in this Kingdom; and for indemnifying Persons who have been guilty of Offences against the Laws of the Customs and Excise, upon the Terms therein mentioned. (Repealed by Statute Law Revision Act 1861 (24 & 25 Vict. c. 101))
Inferior Courts Act 1779 (repealed)	19 Geo. 3. c. 70	30 June 1779
An Act for extending the Provisions of an Act, made in the Twelfth Year of the Reign of King George the First, intituled, "An Act to prevent frivolous and vexatious Arrests;" (Note: Frivolous Arrests Act 1725 (12 Geo. 1. c. 29)) and for other Purposes. (Repealed by Administration of Justice Act 1965 (c. 2))
Appropriation Act 1779 (repealed)	19 Geo. 3. c. 71	30 June 1779
An Act for granting to His Majesty a certain Sum of Money out of the Sinking Fund; and for applying certain Monies therein mentioned for the Service of the Year One thousand seven hundred and seventy-nine; and for further appropriating the Supplies granted in this Session of Parliament. (Repealed by Statute Law Revision Act 1871 (34 & 35 Vict. c. 116))
Militia, etc. Act 1779 (repealed)	19 Geo. 3. c. 72	30 June 1779
An Act to explain, amend and render more effectual the several Laws now in being, relative to the Militia Forces of this Kingdom; and for making certain Provisions relative to the Fencible Men in that Part of Great Britain called Scotland. (Repealed by Statute Law Revision Act 1861 (24 & 25 Vict. c. 101))
Loans or Exchequer Bills (No. 3) Act 1779 (repealed)	19 Geo. 3. c. 73	30 June 1779
An Act for enabling His Majesty to raise the Sum of One Million, for the Uses and Purposes therein mentioned. (Repealed by Statute Law Revision Act 1871 (34 & 35 Vict. c. 116))
Penitentiary Act 1779 or the Transportation, etc. Act 1779 (repealed)	19 Geo. 3. c. 74	30 June 1779
An Act to explain and amend the Laws relating to the Transportation, Imprisonment and other Punishment of certain Offenders. (Repealed by Statute Law Revision Act 1871 (34 & 35 Vict. c. 116))
Navy (No. 2) Act 1779 (repealed)	19 Geo. 3. c. 75	3 July 1779
An Act for removing certain Difficulties with respect to the more speedy and effectual Manning of His Majesty's Navy, for a limited Time. (Repealed by Statute Law Revision Act 1871 (34 & 35 Vict. c. 116))
Militia Act 1779 (repealed)	19 Geo. 3. c. 76	3 July 1779
An Act for augmenting the Militia. (Repealed by Statute Law Revision Act 1861 (24 & 25 Vict. c. 101))
Composition for a Crown Debt Act 1779 (repealed)	19 Geo. 3. c. 77	17 June 1779
An Act to enable the Commissioners of His Majesty's Treasury to compound a Debt due to the Crown from James Gildart and his Sureties; and for vesting the Estates of the said James Gildart in Francis Gildart and Thomas Gildart; and for other Purposes therein mentioned. (Repealed by Statute Law Revision Act 1948 (11 & 12 Geo. 6. c. 62))
Tyne Bridge Act 1779	19 Geo. 3. c. 78	17 June 1779
An Act for enlarging the Term of an Act, passed in the Twelfth Year of His present Majesty's Reign, (Note: Tyne Bridge (No. 2) Act 1772 (12 Geo. 3. c. 100)) for building a temporary Bridge over the River Tyne, between the Town of Newcastle upon Tyne and Gateshead, in the County of Durham; for completing the new Stone Bridge over the said River; and for making the Avenues to, and the Passage over the same, more commodious.
Berwick Roads Act 1779 (repealed)	19 Geo. 3. c. 79	9 February 1779
An Act for enlarging the Term and Powers of an Act, made in the Twenty-sixth Year of the Reign of His Majesty King George the Second, intituled, "An Act for repairing the Road from the Turnpike Road at Buckton Burn, in the County of Durham, through Berwick upon Tweed to Lammerton Hill, and also the several other Roads therein mentioned, lying in the said County, and within the Liberties of the said Town of Berwick. (Note: Berwick Roads Act 1753 (26 Geo. 2. c. 82)) (Repealed by Berwick and Durham Roads and Tweed Bridges Act 1802 (42 Geo. 3. c. cxvii))
Thirsk, Hutton Moor and Masham Road Act 1779 (repealed)	19 Geo. 3. c. 80	16 March 1779
An Act for enlarging the Term and Powers of an Act, made in the Twenty-eighth Year of the Reign of His Majesty King George the Second, intituled, "An Act for repairing and widening the Road from Thirsk over Skipton Bridge, through Baldersby to Baldersby Gate, adjoining to Hutton Moor, in the Way to Ripon, and through Ainderby, Quernhow and Nosterfield, by Well Flashes Gate to Masham, in the County of York; and likewise for removing the Toll House and Turnpike Gates at Busby Stobb, in the said County, to some other convenient Place in the Road leading from Borough Bridge, to the City of Durham." (Note: Thirsk, Hutton Moor and Masham Road Act 1755 (28 Geo. 2. c. 51)) (Repealed by Thirsk and Masham Road Act 1821 (1 & 2 Geo. 4. c. vii))
South Molton Roads Act 1779 (repealed)	19 Geo. 3. c. 81	16 March 1779
An Act for continuing the Term, and altering the Powers of an Act, made in the Thirty-second Year of the Reign of His late Majesty, (Note: South Molton Roads Act 1758 (32 Geo. 2. c. 45)) for repairing, widening and rendering safe and commodious, several Roads leading from the Town of South Molton, in the County of Devon. (Repealed by Southmolton Roads (Devon) Act 1839 (2 & 3 Vict. c. xlix))
Market Harborough to Coventry Road Act 1779 (repealed)	19 Geo. 3. c. 82	16 March 1779
An Act for continuing the Term, and altering and enlarging the Powers of an Act, passed in the Twenty-eighth Year of the Reign of His late Majesty King George the Second, (Note: Market Harborough to Coventry Road Act 1755 (28 Geo. 2. c. 40)) for repairing and widening the Road from the Town of Market Harborough, in the County of Leicester, through the Town of Lutterworth, in the said County, to the City of Coventry. (Repealed by Road from Market Harborough to Coventry Act 1823 (4 Geo. 4. c. lxi))
Buckingham and Middlesex Roads Act 1779 (repealed)	19 Geo. 3. c. 83	16 March 1779
An Act for enlarging the Terms and Powers of Three Acts, passed in the Seventh Year of the Reign of King George the First, (Note: Buckinghamshire Roads Act 1720 (7 Geo. 1. St. 1. c. 24)) and in the Fifteenth (Note: Buckinghamshire Roads Act 1741 (15 Geo. 2. c. 5)) and Twenty-fourth (Note: Beaconsfield and Redhill Road Act 1750 (24 Geo. 2. c. 32)) Years of the Reign of King George the Second, for repairing the Road from Wendover to the Town of Buckingham, and other Roads in the County of Buckingham, so far as the same relate to the Road from the West End of the Town of Beaconsfield, to within Half a Mile of the River Colne, near Uxbridge, in the County of Middlesex. (Repealed by Beaconsfield and Uxbridge Road Act 1806 (46 Geo. 3. c. cii))
Maidenhead Roads Act 1779 (repealed)	19 Geo. 3. c. 84	16 March 1779
An Act for widening and repairing a Lane called Pitt's or Sheppard's Lane, leading from the Market House in the Town of Maidenhead, in the County of Berks, towards Cookham, in the said County; and for turning the Course of the present Road leading from Ray Mills and Cookham, to the Turnpike Road near Maidenhead aforesaid. (Repealed by Maidenhead, Reading and Henley Road Act 1826 (7 Geo. 4. c. lxx))
Ashby-de-la-Zouch and Tutbury Road Act 1779 (repealed)	19 Geo. 3. c. 85	16 March 1779
An Act for continuing the Term, and altering and enlarging the Powers of an Act, made in the Twenty-sixth Year of the Reign of His late Majesty, (Note: Leicester Roads Act 1753 (26 Geo. 2. c. 46)) for repairing the Road from Ashby-de-la-Zouch, in the County of Leicester, through Burton upon Trent, in the County of Stafford, and to the Cock Inn in Tutbury, in the said County. (Repealed by Ashby-de-la-Zouch and Tutbury Road Act 1824 (5 Geo. 4. c. ci))
Hunts Roads Act 1779 (repealed)	19 Geo. 3. c. 86	16 March 1779
An Act for enlarging the Term of an Act, made in the Twenty-eighth Year of King George the Second, intituled, "An Act for repairing the Road from a certain Place in Bury, in the County of Huntingdon, through Warboys, Old Hurst, Saint Ives, Hilton, Eltisley, Waresley, Gamlingay and Potton, to a House called the Spread Eagle in Stratton, within the several Counties of Huntingdon, Cambridge and Bedford." (Note: Bury and Stratton Road Act 1755 (28 Geo. 2. c. 35)) (Repealed by Road from Bury (Huntingdonshire) to Stratton near Biggleswade Act 1819 (59 Geo. 3. c. xxv))
Derbyshire Roads Act 1779 (repealed)	19 Geo. 3. c. 87	16 March 1779
An Act for enlarging the Term and Powers of an Act, made in the Thirty-second Year of the Reign of His Majesty King George the Second, intituled, "An Act for repairing and widening the Road from Chesterfield to the Turnpike Road at Hernstone Lane Head; and also the Road branching from the said Road upon the East Moor through Baslow and Wardlow, to the Joining of the said Roads again near Wardlow Mires; and also the Road leading between the said Road and Branch from Calver Bridge to Baslow Bridge; and also the Road from the Turnpike Road near Newhaven House, to the Turnpike Road near Grindleford Bridge, in the County of Derby." (Note: Derbyshire Roads Act 1758 (32 Geo. 2. c. 43)) (Repealed by Chesterfield and Hernstone Lane Head Turnpike Roads Act 1864 (27 & 28 Vict. c. lxxiv))
Dewsbury to Elland Road Act 1779 (repealed)	19 Geo. 3. c. 88	16 March 1779
An Act for continuing the Term, and altering and enlarging the Powers of an Act, made in the Thirty-second Year of His late Majesty, (Note: Dewsbury to Elland Road Act 1758 (32 Geo. 2. c. 54)) for repairing and widening the Road from Dewsbury to Ealand, in the West Riding of the County of York. (Repealed by Road from Dewsbury to Ealand Act 1836 (6 & 7 Will. 4. c. cxviii))
Worcestershire Roads Act 1779 (repealed)	19 Geo. 3. c. 89	16 March 1779
An Act for continuing the Term, and altering and enlarging the Powers of an Act, made in the Twenty-fifth Year of the Reign of His late Majesty, (Note: Worcestershire Roads Act 1751 (25 Geo. 2. c. 60)) for repairing and amending several Roads leading from Upton, in the County of Worcester, and other Roads therein mentioned; and for amending the Road leading from the White Cross in the Parish of Hanley Castle, in the said County, to the River Severn. (Repealed by Upton-upon-Severn Roads Act 1825 (6 Geo. 4. c. cliii))
Leicester Roads Act 1779 (repealed)	19 Geo. 3. c. 90	16 March 1779
An Act to enlarge the Term and Powers of an Act, passed in the Twenty-sixth Year of the Reign of His late Majesty, for repairing the Road from the Borough of Leicester, in the County of Leicester, to the Town of Ashby-de-la-Zouch, in the said County. (Repealed by Leicester and Ashby-de-la-Zouch Road Act 1800 (39 & 40 Geo. 3. c. ii) and Leicester and Ashby-de-la-Zouch Road Act 1842 (5 & 6 Vict. c. lxxiv))
Stratford to Edghill Road Act 1779 (repealed)	19 Geo. 3. c. 91	16 March 1779
An Act for more effectually repairing the Road leading from Stratford upon Avon to Edghill, in the County of Warwick; and for repealing the several Laws now in force, relating to the said Road. (Repealed by Stratford-upon-Avon and Edgehill Road Act 1819 (59 Geo. 3. c. liv) and Annual Turnpike Acts Continuance Act 1876 (39 & 40 Vict. c. 39))
Wigan to Preston Road Act 1779 (repealed)	19 Geo. 3. c. 92	16 March 1779
An Act for more effectually repairing, widening and amending the Roads from Wigan to Preston, in the County Palatine of Lancaster; and for repealing several Acts made in the Thirteenth Year of King George the First, (Note: Wigan to Preston Road Act 1726 (13 Geo. 1. c. 9)) and the Fourth (Note: Wigan to Preston Road Act 1730 (4 Geo. 2. c. 31)) and Twenty-third (Note: Wigan to Preston Road Act 1749 (23 Geo. 2. c. 7)) Years of His late Majesty, relating to the said Roads. (Repealed by Wigan and Preston Roads Act 1822 (3 Geo. 4. c. iii))
Gloucester Roads Act 1779 (repealed)	19 Geo. 3. c. 93	16 March 1779
An Act for amending and keeping in Repair, the Road from a certain Bridge over a Brook or Stream called Sudbrook, near the City of Gloucester, to the Nine Mile Stone on the Bristol Road, at or near a Place called the Clay Pits, in the County of Gloucester. (Repealed by Gloucester and Clay Pitts Road Act 1821 (1 & 2 Geo. 4. c. vi), Annual Turnpike Acts Continuance Act 1876 (39 & 40 Vict. c. 39) and Statute Law (Repeals) Act 2013 (c. 2))
Wilts, Dorset and Somerset Roads Act 1779 (repealed)	19 Geo. 3. c. 94	1 April 1779
An Act for continuing the Term, and varying the Powers of Two Acts, made in the Twenty-sixth (Note: Wiltshire, Dorset and Somerset Roads Act 1753 (26 Geo. 2. c. 60)) and Twenty-ninth (Note: Wiltshire, Dorset and Somerset Roads Act 1756 (29 Geo. 2. c. 92)) Years of the Reign of His late Majesty, for repairing and widening the Road from the Top of White Sheet Hill, in the Parish of Donhead Saint Andrew, in the County of Wilts, and several other Roads therein mentioned, in the Counties of Dorset, Somerset and Wilts. (Repealed by %[%[Donhead St. Andrew and Nether Compton Road (Wiltshire) Act 1801]] ([[41 Geo. 3 (U.K.)41 Geo. 3%]%]. c. xxxviii))
Northumberland Roads Act 1779 (repealed)	19 Geo. 3. c. 95	1 April 1779
An Act for repealing an Act made in the Twenty-fifth Year of the Reign of His late Majesty King George the Second, (Note: Northumberland Roads (No. 2) Act 1751 (25 Geo. 2. c. 46)) for repairing and widening the Road from Alemouth through the Town of Alnwick to Rothbury, and from thence to the Town of Hexham; and also the Road leading out of the aforesaid Road between Alnwick and Rothbury, to Jockey's Dike Bridge, in the County of Northumberland; and for making more effectual Provision for the Repair of the said Roads. (Repealed by Alemouth and Hexham Road and Branches Act 1800 (39 & 40 Geo. 3. c. xx))
Yorkshire and Derby Roads Act 1779 (repealed)	19 Geo. 3. c. 96	1 April 1779
An Act for enlarging the Term and Powers of an Act, made in the Thirty-first Year of the Reign of His late Majesty King George the Second, intituled, "An Act for repairing and widening the Roads from Little Sheffield, in the County of York, through the Towns of Hathersage, Hope and Castleton to Sparrow Pit Gate, in the County of Derby; and from the Guide Post near Barber's Fields Cupola, through Grindleford Bridge, Great Hucklow, Tidswell, Hardgate, Wall and Fairsield to Buxton, in the County of Derby." (Note: Yorks and Derby Roads Act 1757 (31 Geo. 2. c. 62)) (Repealed by Yorkshire and Derby Roads Act 1795 (35 Geo. 3. c. 164) (Note: Incorrectly cited as "25 G 3 c 164" in the Chronological Table of the Statutes.) and Sheffield and Chapel-en-le-Frith Roads Act 1825 (6 Geo. 4. c. cxliv))
Carlisle and Eamont Bridge Road Act 1779 (repealed)	19 Geo. 3. c. 97	1 April 1779
An Act for continuing the Term, and altering the Powers of an Act made in the Twenty-sixth Year of the Reign of His late Majesty, (Note: Carlisle and Eamont Bridge Road Act 1753 (26 Geo. 2. c. 40)) for repairing the Road from the City of Carlisle to the Town of Penrith, in the County of Cumberland, and from the said Town of Penrith to Eamont Bridge, which divides the Counties of Cumberland and Westmorland. (Repealed by Road from Carlisle to Penrith and to Eamont Bridge Act 1830 (11 Geo. 4 & 1 Will. 4. c. cx) and Brough and Eamont Bridge Turnpike Act 1856 (19 & 20 Vict. c. lxxii))
Flimwell and Hastings Road Act 1779 (repealed)	19 Geo. 3. c. 98	1 April 1779
An Act for continuing the Term, and enlarging the Powers of an Act, made in the Twenty-sixth Year of the Reign of His late Majesty King George the Second, (Note: Flimwell and Hastings Road Act 1753 (26 Geo. 2. c. 54)) for repairing and widening the Road leading from Flimwell Vent, in the Parish of Ticehurst, in the County of Sussex, to the Town and Port of Hastings, in the said County. (Repealed by Road from Ticehurst to Hastings Act 1821 (1 & 2 Geo. 4. c. xli))
Derby and Yorks Roads Act 1779 (repealed)	19 Geo. 3. c. 99	1 April 1779
An Act for repairing and widening the Road from Gander Lane, in the County of Derby, to Sheffield, in the West Riding of the County of York; and also the Road branching out of the said Road at or near Mosbrough Green, in the said County of Derby, to Clown, in the same County. (Repealed by Gander Lane and Sheffield, and Mosborough Green and Clown Roads Act 1821 (1 & 2 Geo. 4. c. liv) and Annual Turnpike Acts Continuance Act 1872 (35 & 36 Vict. c. 85))
Bridgwater Roads Act 1779 (repealed)	19 Geo. 3. c. 100	1 April 1779
An Act for enlarging the Term, and altering and varying the Powers of so much of an Act, made in the Thirty-second Year of the Reign of His late Majesty King George the Second, (Note: Somerset and Gloucester Roads Act 1758 (32 Geo. 2. c. 40)) for repairing several Roads leading to the Town of Bridgewater, in the County of Somerset, and other Roads therein mentioned, as relates to the Roads leading to the said Town. (Repealed by Bridgwater (Somerset) Roads Act 1822 (3 Geo. 4. c. lxv))
Southampton Roads Act 1779 (repealed)	19 Geo. 3. c. 101	1 April 1779
An Act for enlarging the Term and Powers of Two Acts, made in the Thirty-second Year of the Reign of His late Majesty King George the Second, (Note: Dorset Roads Act 1758 (32 Geo. 2. c. 50)) and in the Second Year of the Reign of His present Majesty, (Note: Hants and Dorset Roads Act 1762 (2 Geo. 3. c. 57)) for repairing and widening the Roads from Oxdown Gate in Popham Lane, to the City of Winchester, and from the said City through Hursley to Chandler's Ford, and from Hursley aforesaid to the Turnpike Road at Romsey, and from the said Turnpike Road through Ringwood, in the County of Southampton, to Longham Bridge and Winborne Minster, in the County of Dorset; and for amending and widening the Road from Ringwood Gate in the said County of Southampton to Woolsbridge, and from a Street called The Hundred at Romsey, through Chilworth, to the River at Swathling, in the said County. (Repealed by Winchester Roads Act 1823 (4 Geo. 4. c. cxx))
Ludlow-fach, Llandovery and River Amman Roads Act 1779 (repealed)	19 Geo. 3. c. 102	1 April 1779
An Act for amending, widening and keeping in Repair, the Roads leading from Ludlowfach, in the County of Carmarthen, to the Town of Llandovery, and from thence through the Town of Llangadock to the River Amman, and several other Roads in the said County communicating therewith. (Repealed by Ludlow-fach, Llandovery and River Amman Roads Act 1813 (53 Geo. 3. c. lxiv) and Ludlow-fach, Llandovery and River Amman Roads (Carmarthen and Glamorgan) Act 1831 (1 Will. 4. c. lix))
Carmarthen Roads (No. 2) Act 1779 (repealed)	19 Geo. 3. c. 103	1 April 1779
An Act for continuing the Term, and enlarging the Powers of an Act, made in the Fifth Year of His present Majesty, (Note: Carmarthen Roads Act 1765 (5 Geo. 3. c. 76)) for repairing, widening and keeping in Repair, several Roads leading from Kidwelly, in the County of Carmarthen, and also several Roads leading from Llandilo in the said County, so far as relates to the Roads included in the Kidwelly District; and also for repairing, widening and keeping in Repair, several other Roads within the said County. (Repealed by Kidwelly District of Roads Act 1824 (5 Geo. 4. c. ii))
Surrey Roads Act 1779 (repealed)	19 Geo. 3. c. 104	1 April 1779
An Act for continuing the Term, and altering and enlarging the Powers of an Act, made in the Thirty-first Year of the Reign of His late Majesty, (Note: Leatherhead and Guildford Road Act 1757 (31 Geo. 2. c. 77)) for repairing and widening the Road from the Swan Inn at Leatherhead, to the Maypole at the Upper End of Spital or Somerset Street, in the Parish of Stoke, near the Town of Guldeford, in the County of Surrey. (Repealed by Road from Leatherhead to Stoke (Surrey) Act 1822 (3 Geo. 4. c. xcvii), Annual Turnpike Acts Continuance Act 1867 (30 & 31 Vict. c. 121) and Statute Law (Repeals) Act 2013 (c. 2))
Cockermouth and Workington Road Act 1779 (repealed)	19 Geo. 3. c. 105	18 May 1779
An Act for continuing the Term, and altering the Powers of an Act, made in the Twenty-sixth Year of the Reign of His late Majesty King George the Second, (Note: Cockermouth and Workington Road Act 1753 (26 Geo. 2. c. 49)) for repairing the Road from the City of Carlisle, in the County of Cumberland, to the Market and Sea Port Town of Workington, in the said County, so far as the same relates to the Road between the Town of Cockermouth and Workington aforesaid. (Repealed by Cockermouth and Workington Road Act 1823 (4 Geo. 4. c. xxiii))
Brough and Eamont Bridge Road Act 1779 (repealed)	19 Geo. 3. c. 106	18 May 1779
An Act for continuing the Term, and altering and enlarging the Powers of an Act, made in the Twenty-sixth Year of the Reign of His late Majesty, (Note: Brough and Eamont Bridge Road Act 1753 (26 Geo. 2. c. 67)) for repairing and widening the Roads from the East End of Brough under Stainmore, (Note: Brough, Cumbria.) in the County of Westmoreland, by the End of Appleby Bridge (Note: The B6542 (former A66) road passes the end of the bridge over the River Eden, in Appleby-in-Westmorland, Cumbria. 54°34′42″N 2°29′21″W) to Eamont Bridge, (Note: Eamont Bridge carrying the A6 road across the River Eamont in Cumbria. 54°39′06″N 2°44′31″W) in the said County. (Repealed by Brough and Eamont Bridge Turnpike Act 1856 (19 & 20 Vict. c. lxxii))
Flint and Carnarvon Roads Act 1779 (repealed)	19 Geo. 3. c. 107	18 May 1779
An Act for enlarging the Term and Powers of so much of an Act, made in the Thirtieth Year of the Reign of His Majesty King George the Second, intituled, "An Act for amending, widening and keeping in Repair, the Roads from the Town of Wrexham, in the County of Denbigh, to Pentre Bridge, in the County of Flint; and from the Town of Mold to Northop, Holywell and Rhuddlan, in the same County; and from thence to the Ferry House opposite to the Town of Conway, in the County of Carnarvon; and from Ruthin to the said Town of Mold," (Note: Denbigh and Carnarvon Roads Act 1757 (30 Geo. 2. c. 69)) as relates to the District of Road from the Town of Wrexham, in the County of Denbigh, to Pentre Bridge, in the County of Flint. (Repealed by Wrexham and Pentre Bridge Road and Abermorddu and Mold Branch Act 1819 (59 Geo. 3. c. xliii) and Annual Turnpike Acts Continuance Act 1872 (35 & 36 Vict. c. 85))
Westmorland Roads (No. 2) Act 1779 (repealed)	19 Geo. 3. c. 108	18 May 1779
An Act for enlarging the Term and Powers of an Act, made in the Twenty-sixth Year of the Reign of His Majesty King George the Second, intituled, "An Act for widening and repairing the High Road leading from Heron Syke, which divides the Counties of Lancaster and Westmorland, to the Town of Kirkby in Kendal; and from the said Town of Kirkby in Kendal, through the Town of Shapp to Emont Bridge, in the said County of Westmoreland." (Note: Lancaster and Westmorland Roads Act 1753 (26 Geo. 2. c. 52)) (Repealed by Heronsyke, Kendal and Eamont Bridge Road Act 1815 (55 Geo. 3. c. xxxvii))
Denbigh, Flint and Carnarvon Roads Act 1779 (repealed)	19 Geo. 3. c. 109	18 May 1779
An Act for enlarging the Term and Powers of so much of an Act, made in the Thirtieth Year of the Reign of His Majesty King George the Second, intituled, "An Act for amending, widening and keeping in Repair, the Roads from the Town of Wrexham, in the County of Denbigh, to Pentre Bridge, in the County of Flint; and from the Town of Mold to Northop, Holywell and Rhuddlan, in the same County; and from thence to the Ferry House opposite the Town of Conway, in the County of Carnarvon; and from Ruthin to the said Town of Mold," as relates to the District of Road from the Town of Ruthin, in the County of Denbigh, to the Town of Mold, in the County of Flint. (Repealed by Ruthin and Mold Roads Act 1822 (3 Geo. 4. c. xli) and Annual Turnpike Acts Continuance Act 1876 (39 & 40 Vict. c. 39))
Glamorgan Roads Act 1779 (repealed)	19 Geo. 3. c. 110	18 May 1779
An Act for enlarging the Term and Powers of an Act, made in the Eleventh Year of the Reign of His present Majesty, intituled, "An Act for repairing and widening several Roads leading to the Town of Lantrissent, and also the Road leading from Newbridge, to a Place called The Old Furnace, all in the County of Glamorgan." (Note: Glamorgan Roads Act 1771 (11 Geo. 3. c. 77)) (Repealed by Merthyr Tydfil Road Act 1812 (52 Geo. 3. c. cxxxix) and South Wales Turnpike Trusts Act 1844 (7 & 8 Vict. c. 91))
Wilts Roads Act 1779 (repealed)	19 Geo. 3. c. 111	31 May 1779
An Act for enlarging the Term and Powers of an Act, passed in the Thirtieth Year of the Reign of King George the Second, (Note: Wiltshire Roads Act 1757 (30 Geo. 2. c. 41)) for amending, widening and keeping in Repair, the Road from the Turnpike Road at the Bottom of Shaw Hill, in the Parish of Melksham, through Googes Lane, Corsham, Biddestone and West Yatton, to the Turnpike Road at Upper Combe, in the Parish of Castle Combe, in the County of Wilts. (Repealed by Melksham and Castle Coombe Road Act 1799 (39 Geo. 3. c. xlviii))
Corsham to Bath Easton Bridge Road Act 1779 (repealed)	19 Geo. 3. c. 112	31 May 1779
An Act for continuing the Term of an Act of the Thirtieth Year of His late Majesty, (Note: Wiltshire and Somerset Roads Act 1757 (30 Geo. 2. c. 46)) for amending, widening, making commodious and keeping in Repair, the Road from The Cross Keys, otherwise Bricker's Barn, in the Parish of Corsham, in the County of Wilts, to Bath Easton Bridge, in the County of Somerset. (Repealed by Road from Bricker's Barn to the Kingsdown and Batheaston Road Act 1819 (59 Geo. 3. c. xlv))
Span Smithy, Winsford Bridge and Northwich Roads Act 1779 (repealed)	19 Geo. 3. c. 113	17 June 1779
An Act to enlarge the Term and Powers of an Act, passed in the Twenty-sixth Year of the Reign of His late Majesty King George the Second, (Note: Span Smithy, Winsford Bridge and Northwich Roads Act 1753 (26 Geo. 2. c. 84)) for repairing and widening the Roads from Spann Smithy, in the Township of Elton, through the Town of Middlewich, and by Spittle Hill in Stanthorn to Winsford Bridge, and from Spittle Hill to the Town of Northwich, in the County Palatine of Chester. (Repealed by Span Smithy, Winsford Bridge and Northwich Roads Act 1822 (3 Geo. 4. c. xlviii))
Ludlow Roads Act 1779 (repealed)	19 Geo. 3. c. 114	17 June 1779
An Act for reviving and continuing the Term, and varying the Powers of an Act, made in the Twenty-ninth Year of His late Majesty, (Note: Ludlow Roads Act 1756 (29 Geo. 2. c. 59)) for amending, widening and keeping in Repair, several Roads leading from the Market House, and elsewhere in the Town of Ludlow, in the County of Salop; and for amending and keeping in Repair, the Road leading from the Turnpike or Side Gate in the Parish of Ashford Bowdler, to the Turnpike Road on the Clee Hill, in the said County. (Repealed by Ludlow Roads Act 1820 (1 Geo. 4. c. xxxiii))
Gloucester Roads (No. 2) Act 1779 (repealed)	19 Geo. 3. c. 115	17 June 1779
An Act to enlarge the Term and Powers of an Act, passed in the Twenty-fifth Year of the Reign of His late Majesty, (Note: Gloucester Roads Act 1751 (25 Geo. 2. c. 13)) for repairing the Road from the Town of Cirencester to the Town of Stroud, and that Part of Rodborough Hill which leads to Dudbridge; and also the Road leading from Cirencester towards Bisley, so far as the Bottom of Gulph Hill, all in the County of Gloucester. (Repealed by Cirencester Roads Act 1825 (6 Geo. 4. c. cxliii))
Cirencester to Cricklade Road Act 1779 (repealed)	19 Geo. 3. c. 116	17 June 1779
An Act to enlarge the Term and Powers of an Act, passed in the Thirty-first Year of the Reign of His late Majesty King George the Second, (Note: Cirencester to Cricklade Road Act 1757 (31 Geo. 2. c. 61)) for repairing and widening the Road from Cirencester, in the County of Gloucester, to Cricklade, in the County of Wilts. (Repealed by Road from Cirencester to Cricklade Act 1822 (3 Geo. 4. c. ci) and Cirencester Roads Act 1825 (6 Geo. 4. c. cxliii))
Bristol Roads Act 1779 (repealed)	19 Geo. 3. c. 117	18 May 1779
An Act for making and repairing several Roads round the City of Bristol. (Repealed by Bristol Roads Act 1819 (59 Geo. 3. c. xcv))
Gloucester and Wilts Roads Act 1779 (repealed)	19 Geo. 3. c. 118	31 May 1779
An Act for amending the Road from the Nine Mile Stone on the Bristol Road, at or near a Place called The Clay Pits, to or near the Chapel at Stone; and also the Roads to and near Berkeley, Dursley, Wotton under Edge, Stroud and Sodbury; and several other Roads in the Counties of Gloucester and Wilts. (Repealed by Gloucester to Bristol Road and Branches Act 1821 (1 & 2 Geo. 4. c. lxxxii))
Darlaston Turnpike Act 1779 (repealed)	19 Geo. 3. c. 119	18 May 1779
An Act for reducing into one Act of Parliament the several Laws now in force, for repairing the Road leading from the Town or Village of Tittensor to the most Northern Part of Talk on the Hill, in Butt Lane, in the County of Stafford; and for repairing the Road from Darlastone Bridge over Tittensor Heath, through the Town or Village of Tittensor aforesaid. (Repealed by Darlaston Turnpike Act 1823 (4 Geo. 4. c. xxx))
Kilburn Road Act 1779 (repealed)	19 Geo. 3. c. 120	18 May 1779
An Act for continuing the Term, and altering and enlarging the Powers of several Acts of Parliament, made in the Tenth Year of the Reign of Queen Anne, (Note: Kilburn Road Act 1711 (10 Ann. c. 3)) the Eighth Year of King George the First, (Note: Kilburn Road Act 1721 (8 Geo. 1. c. 9)) and the Twenty-second Year of His late Majesty, (Note: Kilburn Road Act 1748 (22 Geo. 2. c. 14)) for repairing the Road leading from Kilburn Bridge, (Note: Kilburn Bridge was located where the Edgware Road (Kilburn High Road) crossed the River Westbourne. The river is now culverted. 51°32′08″N 0°11′25″W) in the County of Middlesex, to Sparrow's Herne, (Note: Sparrows Herne was a settlement located between Bushey and Bushey Heath. The section of the A411 road in the area continues the name. 51°38′17″N 0°21′04″W) in the County of Hertford. (Repealed by Metropolis Roads Act 1826 (7 Geo. 4. c. cxlii))

=== Private acts ===
Short title	Citation	Royal assent
Long title
Winforton Inclosure Act 1779	19 Geo. 3. c. 1 Pr.	16 December 1778
An Act for extinguishing the Right of Common upon certain enclosed Lands, within the Parish of Winforton, in the County of Hereford.
Hose's Naturalization Act 1779	19 Geo. 3. c. 2 Pr.	16 December 1778
An Act for naturalizing John Daniel Hose.
Wood Bastwick Inclosure Act 1779	19 Geo. 3. c. 3 Pr.	24 December 1778
An Act for dividing and enclosing the Common or Waste Land within the Parish of Wood Bastwick, in the County of Norfolk.
Flore Inclosure Act 1779	19 Geo. 3. c. 4 Pr.	9 February 1779
An Act to enlarge, explain, and amend the Powers given in and by an Act passed in the last Session of Parliament, intituled, "An Act for dividing and enclosing the Open and Common Fields, Common Pastures, Common Meadows and other Commonable Lands and Grounds, of and within the Manor, Parish and Liberties of Floore otherwise Flower, in the County of Northampton;" (Note: Flore Inclosure Act 1778 (18 Geo. 3. c. 78 Pr.)) and for making the same more effectual for the Purposes therein mentioned.
Bugbrooke Inclosure Act 1779	19 Geo. 3. c. 5 Pr.	9 February 1779
An Act for dividing and enclosing the Open and Common Fields, Common Pastures, Common Meadows and other Commonable Lands and Grounds, of and within the Parish and Liberties of Bugbrooke, in the County of Northampton.
Beijer's Naturalization Act 1779	19 Geo. 3. c. 6 Pr.	9 February 1779
An Act for naturalizing Theodorus Martinus Mispelblom Beijer.
Barkby Inclosure Act 1779	19 Geo. 3. c. 7 Pr.	16 March 1779
An Act for dividing, allotting and enclosing the Open Fields, Meadows and Commonable Places, in the Parish of Barkby, in the County of Leicester.
Confirming and establishing Milston and Brigmerston (Wiltshire) divisions and allotments.	19 Geo. 3. c. 8 Pr.	16 March 1779
An Act for confirming and establishing the Division and Allotment of the Common or Open Fields and Common Downs, within the Manor of Milston and Brigmerston, in the County of Wilts.
Brattleby Inclosure Act 1779	19 Geo. 3. c. 9 Pr.	16 March 1779
An Act for dividing and enclosing certain Open Fields, Lands and Grounds, in the Parish of Brattleby, in the County of Lincoln.
Croft Inclosure Act 1779	19 Geo. 3. c. 10 Pr.	16 March 1779
An Act for dividing and enclosing the Open Fields, Meadows, Pastures and Commonable Grounds of Croft, in the County of Leicester.
West Witton Inclosure Act 1779	19 Geo. 3. c. 11 Pr.	16 March 1779
An Act for dividing and enclosing a Common Stinted Pasture, and a certain Moor or Common, within the Manor of West Witton, in the North Riding of the County of York.
Ablington Inclosure Act 1779	19 Geo. 3. c. 12 Pr.	16 March 1779
An Act for dividing, allotting and enclosing, the Open Common Fields, Common Pastures, Downs, and all other Commonable Lands, within the Hamlet, Vill or Tything of Ablington, in the Parish of Bibury, in the County of Gloucester.
Binton and Drayton in Old Stratford (Warwickshire) Inclosure Act 1779	19 Geo. 3. c. 13 Pr.	16 March 1779
An Act for dividing and enclosing certain Open Common Fields, Meadows, Pastures and other Commonable Lands, in the Parish of Binton, and in the Hamlet of Drayton, in the Parish of Old Stratford, in the County of Warwick.
Coleshill Inclosure Act 1779	19 Geo. 3. c. 14 Pr.	16 March 1779
An Act for dividing and enclosing the Open and Common Fields, Meadows, Heath or Waste Land, and other Commonable Lands and Grounds, of and within the Parish of Coleshill, in the County of Warwick.
Cobham Inclosure Act 1779	19 Geo. 3. c. 15 Pr.	16 March 1779
An Act for dividing and enclosing the Common and Open Fields, within the Parish of Cobham, in the County of Surrey.
Lepton Inclosure Act 1779	19 Geo. 3. c. 16 Pr.	16 March 1779
An Act for dividing and enclosing the Commons and Waste Grounds, within the Township of Lepton, in the Parish of Kirkheaton, in the West Riding of the County of York.
Knight Thorpe and Thorpe Acre (Leicestershire) Inclosure Act 1779	19 Geo. 3. c. 17 Pr.	16 March 1779
An Act for dividing, allotting and enclosing the Open Fields, Meadows, Pastures and Commonable Places, in the Lordships or Liberties of Knight Thorpe and Thorpe Acre, in the County of Leicester.
Askwith Inclosure Act 1779	19 Geo. 3. c. 18 Pr.	16 March 1779
An Act for dividing, enclosing and improving certain Commons, Lands and Grounds, in the Township of Askwith, in the Parish of Weston, in the County of York; and for other Purposes therein mentioned.
Broom Inclosure Act 1779	19 Geo. 3. c. 19 Pr.	16 March 1779
An Act for dividing and enclosing certain Commons and Waste Lands, within the Manor and Parish of Broom, in the County of Stafford.
Percy's Divorce Act 1779	19 Geo. 3. c. 20 Pr.	16 March 1779
An Act to dissolve the Marriage had between the Right Honourable Hugh Baron Percy, Lucy, Poynings, Fitzpayne, Bryan and Latimer, and the Right Honourable Ann Baroness Percy, his Wife, and to enable him to marry again; and for other Purposes therein mentioned.
Acton's Name Act 1779	19 Geo. 3. c. 21 Pr.	16 March 1779
An Act to enable Nathaniel Lee Acton Esquire, and the Heirs Male of His Body, to take and use the Surname of Lee, before, and jointly with, the Surname of Acton, pursuant to the Will of Baptist Lee Esquire, deceased.
House's Name Act 1779	19 Geo. 3. c. 22 Pr.	16 March 1779
An Act to enable William House the Younger, and others therein described, to take and use the Surname and Arms of Newell, pursuant to the Will of William Newell Esquire, deceased.
Confirming and establishing an exchange of lands in Lincolnshire between the dean and chapter of Lincoln Cathedral and John Lord Manson.	19 Geo. 3. c. 23 Pr.	1 April 1779
An Act for confirming and establishing an Exchange agreed upon between the Dean and Chapter of the Cathedral Church of The Blessed Virgin Mary of Lincoln, and the Right Honourable John Lord Monson, of certain Lands and Hereditaments, in the County of Lincoln.
Willson's Estate Act 1779	19 Geo. 3. c. 24 Pr.	1 April 1779
An Act for vesting certain Lands, Tenements and Hereditaments in the Counties of Hertford and Bucks (the Settled Estates of Jane Willson, the Wife of George Willson Esquire) in Trustees to be sold or exchanged, and for laying out the Money to arise thereby in the Purchase of other Lands, Tenements or Hereditaments, to be settled to the same Uses.
Dunsley and Haffcott Commons (Staffordshire) Inclosure Act 1779	19 Geo. 3. c. 25 Pr.	1 April 1779
An Act for dividing, enclosing and allotting, certain Commons or Parcels of Waste Lands called Dunsley and Haffcott Commons, within the Manor and Parish of Kinver otherwise Kinfare, in the County of Stafford.
Willingham Inclosure Act 1779	19 Geo. 3. c. 26 Pr.	1 April 1779
An Act for dividing and enclosing the Open Fields, Meadows, Furze Leys, Stinted Common Pastures and Waste Grounds, in the Parish of Willingham, in the County of Lincoln.
Extinguishing cattle gates or leas upon certain pasture in West Stower (Dorset) and allotting lands in exchange for part of glebe lands and for said cattle gates or leas belonging to impropriator of said parish.	19 Geo. 3. c. 27 Pr.	1 April 1779
An Act for extinguishing the Cattle Gates or Leas upon certain Stinted Pastures within the Parish of West Stower, in the County of Dorset, and for allotting Lands in Exchange for Part of the Glebe Lands, and for the said Cattle Gates or Leas belonging to the Impropriator of the said Parish.
Aven Dassett Inclosure Act 1779	19 Geo. 3. c. 28 Pr.	1 April 1779
An Act for allotting, dividing and enclosing, the Open and Common Fields and Common or Commonable Meadows, Pastures, Lands and Grounds, and Common or Waste Land, within the Parish of Aven Dassett, in the County of Warwick.
Badby Inclosure Act 1779	19 Geo. 3. c. 29 Pr.	1 April 1779
An Act for dividing and enclosing the Open and Common Fields, Common Pastures, Common Meadows and other Commonable Lands and Grounds, of and within the Parish and Liberties of Badby, in the County of Northampton.
Mayseyhampton Inclosure Act 1779	19 Geo. 3. c. 30 Pr.	1 April 1779
An Act for dividing, allotting and enclosing the Open and Common Fields, Common Meadows, Common Pastures and all other Commonable Lands and Waste Grounds, in the Parish of Mayseyhampton, in the County of Gloucester.
Himbleton Inclosure Act 1779	19 Geo. 3. c. 31 Pr.	1 April 1779
An Act for dividing and enclosing the Open and Common Fields, Meadows, Pastures and all other Commonable Lands, within the Manor and Parish of Himbleton, in the County of Worcester.
Grafton Flyford Inclosure Act 1779	19 Geo. 3. c. 32 Pr.	1 April 1779
An Act for dividing and enclosing the Open and Common Fields and all other Commonable Land, in the Parish of Grafton Flyford, in the County of Worcester.
Cropthorn Inclosure Act 1779	19 Geo. 3. c. 33 Pr.	1 April 1779
An Act for dividing and enclosing the several Open and Common Fields, and all other Commonable Lands, within and belonging to the Township of Cropthorn, in the Parish of Cropthorn, and County of Worcester.
Elton Inclosure Act 1779	19 Geo. 3. c. 34 Pr.	1 April 1779
An Act for dividing and enclosing the Common and Open Fields, Meadows, Commonable Lands and Waste Grounds, in the Parish of Elton, in the County of Huntingdon.
Harbury Inclosure Act 1779	19 Geo. 3. c. 35 Pr.	1 April 1779
An Act for dividing and enclosing the Open and Common Fields, and Common or Commonable Meadows, Pastures, Lands and Grounds and Waste Land, within the Parish of Herberbury otherwise Harbury, in the County of Warwick.
Woodend in Blakesley Inclosure Act 1779	19 Geo. 3. c. 36 Pr.	1 April 1779
An Act for dividing and enclosing the Open and Common Fields, and other Commonable Lands and Grounds, of and within the Hamlet and Liberties of Woodend, in the Parish of Blakesley, in the County of Northampton.
Stanton under Bardon Inclosure Act 1779	19 Geo. 3. c. 37 Pr.	1 April 1779
An Act for dividing and enclosing the Open Fields, Open Meadows, Common Pastures and Common or Waste Grounds, within the Township of Stanton under Bardon, in the Parish of Thornton and County of Leicester.
Huttoft Inclosure Act 1779	19 Geo. 3. c. 38 Pr.	1 April 1779
An Act for dividing, enclosing and improving certain Open Fields, Ings, Meadows and Commons or Waste Lands, within the Parish of Huttoft, in the County of Lincoln.
Cainham Inclosure Act 1779	19 Geo. 3. c. 39 Pr.	1 April 1779
An Act for dividing, enclosing and allotting certain Commons or Waste Lands, within the Parish of Cainham, in the County of Salop.
Fenwick Inclosure Act 1779	19 Geo. 3. c. 40 Pr.	1 April 1779
An Act for dividing and enclosing a certain Common or Piece of Waste Ground, within the Township of Fenwick, in the Parish of Campsal, in the West Riding of the County of York.
Buckland Inclosure Act 1779	19 Geo. 3. c. 41 Pr.	1 April 1779
An Act for dividing and enclosing the Open Common Fields, Common Meadows, Common Pastures, Commonable Lands and Waste Grounds, within the Manor and Parish of Buckland, in the County of Gloucester.
West Knighton Inclosure Act 1779	19 Geo. 3. c. 42 Pr.	1 April 1779
An Act for dividing and enclosing a certain Open Common Arable Field, and also certain Commons and Waste Lands, within the Manor and Parish of West Knighton, in the County of Dorset.
Raincock's Name Act 1779	19 Geo. 3. c. 43 Pr.	1 April 1779
An Act to enable John Raincock, and others therein described, to take and use the Surname and Arms of Fleming, pursuant to the Will of Fletcher Fleming deceased.
Amsinck's Naturalization Act 1779	19 Geo. 3. c. 44 Pr.	1 April 1779
An Act for naturalizing Henry Amsinck.
Establishing an exchange between George Earl of Shrewsbury and Thomas Gilbert of lands and hereditaments in Staffordshire.	19 Geo. 3. c. 45 Pr.	18 May 1779
An Act for establishing an Exchange between George Earl of Shrewsbury and Thomas Gilbert Esquire, of divers Lands and Hereditaments in the County of Stafford; and for the other Purposes therein mentioned.
Confirming a partition of several estates in Wiltshire and Somerset between Charles William Wyndham, other devisees of Charles Edward Earl of Egremont and their issue, Charles Marquis of Granby and Charlotte Countess of Aylesford.	19 Geo. 3. c. 46 Pr.	18 May 1779
An Act for confirming a Partition of several Estates in the Counties of Wilts and Somerset, between the Honourable Charles William Wyndham and other the Devisees of Charles late Earl of Egremont deceased, and their Issue, and Charles Marquis of Granby, and Charlotte Countess of Aylesford; and for vesting and settling the same to the several Uses therein mentioned; and for several other Purposes therein mentioned.
Style's Estate Act 1779	19 Geo. 3. c. 47 Pr.	18 May 1779
An Act to enable the Guardians of Sir Charles Style Baronet, an Infant, to grant Leases of his Freehold Estates in Middlesex during his Minority; and to effectuate the other Purposes therein mentioned.
Boynton's Estate Act 1779	19 Geo. 3. c. 48 Pr.	18 May 1779
An Act for Sale of the next Presentations to certain Livings, late the Estates of Sir Grissith Boynton Baronet, deceased, for Payment of his Debts; and for substituting other Parts of his Estates to be charged with his younger Childrens Fortunes, in lieu of those by his Will charged therewith; and for other Purposes.
Scourfield's Estate Act 1779	19 Geo. 3. c. 49 Pr.	18 May 1779
An Act for Sale of Part of the Settled Estates of Henry Scourfield Esquire, situate in the County of Brecon, and for purchasing other Estates in the County of Pembroke, to be settled in lieu thereof, to the same Uses.
Tempest's Estate Act 1779	19 Geo. 3. c. 50 Pr.	18 May 1779
An Act for vesting in Trustees, and their Heirs, the Settled Estate of John Tempest Esquire, situate in the County of Kent, in Trust, to sell the same; and for laying out the Money arising by such Sale, in the Purchase of other Lands and Hereditaments, to be settled in lieu thereof, to the same Uses.
Empowering certain persons to enfranchise certain copyhold and customary lands and tenements with manors of Titchfield, Lee Marks and Mirabell, Croften and Newland (Hampshire).	19 Geo. 3. c. 51 Pr.	18 May 1779
An Act to empower certain Persons to enfranchise divers Copyhold and Customary Lands and Tenements, within the several Manors or Lordships of Titchfield, Lee Marks and Mirabell, Croston and Newland, in the County of Southampton; and for other Purposes therein mentioned.
Bowater's Estate Act 1779	19 Geo. 3. c. 52 Pr.	18 May 1779
An Act to enable John Bowater Esquire, during his Life, and after his Death, the Guardian or Guardians of his Issue Male, by the Honourable Frances Bowater his Wife, during their respective Infancies, to grant Building Leases of his Settled Estates at Woolwich and Charlton, in the County of Kent.
Enabling the executors and trustees of Charles Churchill's will and marriage settlement to raise money by sale or mortgage of trust securities for advancement to his children in his lifetime, part of the portions provided for them by said settlement, but thereby not payable till after his death.	19 Geo. 3. c. 53 Pr.	18 May 1779
An Act to enable the Executors and Trustees of the Will of Charles Churchill Esquire, deceased, and in the Marriage Settlement of Charles Churchill Esquire and Lady Maria his Wife, to raise Money by Sale or Mortgage of some of the Trust Securities, for advancing to the Children, in their Father's Lifetime, Part of their Portions provided for them by the Settlement, but thereby not made payable till after his Decease.
Gwynne's Estate Act 1779	19 Geo. 3. c. 54 Pr.	18 May 1779
An Act for vesting certain Estates in the Counties of Carmarthen Brecon and Radnor, (devised by the Will of Roderick Gwynne Esquire, deceased) in Trustees to be sold; and for laying out the Money arising therefrom, in the Purchase of other Lands and Hereditaments, to be settled to the same Uses.
Lanchester Inclosure Act 1779	19 Geo. 3. c. 55 Pr.	18 May 1779
An Act for varying certain Provisions contained in an Act, (Note: Lanchester Inclosure Act 1773 (13 Geo. 3. c. 67 Pr.)) made in the Thirteenth Year of the Reign of His present Majesty, for dividing and enclosing certain Moors, Commons or Tracts of Waste Land, within the Parish and Manor of Lanchester, in the County Palatine of Durham.
Lower Darwen Moor in Blackburn (Lancashire) Inclosure Act 1779	19 Geo. 3. c. 56 Pr.	18 May 1779
An Act for dividing and enclosing a certain Tract of Common or Waste Ground called Lower Darwen Moor, in the Parish of Blackburn, in the County Palatine of Lancaster.
Irthington Inclosure Act 1779	19 Geo. 3. c. 57 Pr.	18 May 1779
An Act for dividing, allotting and enclosing the several Open and Common Fields, Moors, Commons and Waste Grounds, in the Parish of Irthington, in the County of Cumberland.
Claxton or Long Clawson Inclosure Act 1779	19 Geo. 3. c. 58 Pr.	18 May 1779
An Act for dividing and enclosing the Open Fields, Meadows, Common Pastures and other Commonable Lands, within the Parish of Claxton, otherwise Long Clawson, in the County of Leicester.
Bucknell Inclosure Act 1779	19 Geo. 3. c. 59 Pr.	18 May 1779
An Act for dividing and enclosing the Open and Common Fields and Commonable Lands, within the Parish or Liberties of Bucknell, in the County of Oxford.
Amcotts Inclosure Act 1779	19 Geo. 3. c. 60 Pr.	18 May 1779
An Act for dividing and enclosing the Open and Common Fields, Meadows, Common Pastures, Moors and Waste Lands and Grounds, within the Manor and Township of Amcotts, in the Parish of Althorpe, in the County of Lincoln.
Ashover Inclosure Act 1779	19 Geo. 3. c. 61 Pr.	18 May 1779
An Act for dividing and enclosing the Commons and Waste Grounds in the Manor of Ashover, in the County of Derby.
Dean Inclosure Act 1779	19 Geo. 3. c. 62 Pr.	18 May 1779
An Act for dividing, allotting and enclosing the Open and Common Fields, Common Meadows and other Commonable Lands, in the Manor and Hamlet of Dean, in the Parish of Spelsbury, in the County of Oxford.
Iron Acton Inclosure Act 1779	19 Geo. 3. c. 63 Pr.	18 May 1779
An Act for dividing, enclosing and allotting, certain Commonable and Waste Lands called Acton Common, Marlepit Common and Cock Shute, within the Parish of Iron Acton, in the County of Gloucester.
Leire Inclosure Act 1779	19 Geo. 3. c. 64 Pr.	18 May 1779
An Act for dividing and enclosing the Common and Open Fields of Leire, in the County of Leicester.
Kingswood in Stapleton (Gloucestershire) Inclosure Act 1779	19 Geo. 3. c. 65 Pr.	18 May 1779
An Act for dividing and enclosing that Part of the Common or Waste Ground called Kingswood, which lies in the Parish of Stapleton, in the County of Gloucester.
Clifford Chambers Inclosure Act 1779	19 Geo. 3. c. 66 Pr.	18 May 1779
An Act for dividing and enclosing the Open and Common Fields, Common Pastures, Common Meadows and Commonable Lands and Grounds, within the Parish of Clifford Chambers, in the County of Gloucester.
Bierton and Hulcot (Buckinghamshire) Inclosure Act 1779	19 Geo. 3. c. 67 Pr.	18 May 1779
An Act for dividing and enclosing the Open Common Fields, Common Meadows, Waste Lands and Commonable Places, within the Parishes and Liberties of Bierton and Hulcott, in the County of Bucks.
Mildenhall Inclosure Act 1779	19 Geo. 3. c. 68 Pr.	18 May 1779
An Act for confirming and establishing a Division and Enclosure of the Common or Open Fields and Waste Grounds, within the Parish of Mildenhall, in the County of Wilts, and certain Exchanges of Lands and Estates within the said Parish.
Market Rasen Inclosure Act 1779	19 Geo. 3. c. 69 Pr.	18 May 1779
An Act for dividing and enclosing certain Open Fields, Lands and Grounds, in the Parish of Market Raisin, in the County of Lincoln.
Kibwoth Beauchamp Inclosure Act 1779	19 Geo. 3. c. 70 Pr.	18 May 1779
An Act for dividing, allotting and enclosing the Open and Common Fields, Common Meadows and Common Pastures, lying and being within the Manors, Lordships or Liberties of Kibworth Beauchamp, Kibworth Harcourt and Smeeton Westerby, in the Parish of Kibworth Beauchamp, in the County of Leicester.
Little Bowden Inclosure Act 1779	19 Geo. 3. c. 71 Pr.	18 May 1779
An Act for dividing, allotting and enclosing the Open and Common Fields, Common Meadows, Common Pastures and Waste Lands, of and within the Manor, Lordship or Liberties of Little Bowden, in the County of Northampton.
Elcot in Kintbury Inclosure Act 1779	19 Geo. 3. c. 72 Pr.	18 May 1779
An Act for dividing, allotting and enclosing the Open and Common Fields, Common Meadows, Common Pastures, Commons and other Commonable Lands, within the Tything of Elcot, in the Parish of Kintbury, in the County of Berks.
Speen Inclosure Act 1779	19 Geo. 3. c. 73 Pr.	18 May 1779
An Act for dividing, allotting and enclosing certain Open and Common Fields, Common Meadows, Common Pastures, Commons and Commonable Lands and Grounds, within the Parish of Speen, in the County of Berks.
Oulton Heath in Stone (Staffordshire) Inclosure Act 1779	19 Geo. 3. c. 74 Pr.	18 May 1779
An Act for dividing and enclosing a certain Common or Waste Ground called Oulton Heath, in the Parish of Stone, in the County of Stafford.
Wanborough Inclosure Act 1779	19 Geo. 3. c. 75 Pr.	18 May 1779
An Act for dividing and allotting the Open Common Fields, Common Meadows, Common Pastures, Waste Lands and Commonable Places, in the Manor and Parish of Wanborough, in the County of Wilts.
Kislingbury Inclosure Act 1779	19 Geo. 3. c. 76 Pr.	18 May 1779
An Act for dividing, allotting and enclosing the Open and Common Fields, Common Pastures, Common Meadows and other Commonable Lands and Grounds, of and within the Parish of Kislingbury, in the County of Northampton.
Milton or Middleton, Malsor, and Collingtree or Collingtrough (Northamptonshire) Inclosures Act 1779	19 Geo. 3. c. 77 Pr.	18 May 1779
An Act for dividing and enclosing the Open and Common Fields, Common Pastures, Common Meadows and other Commonable Lands and Grounds, of and within the Manors and Parishes of Milton otherwise Middleton, Malsor and Collingtree otherwise Collingtrough, in the County of Northampton.
Idbury Inclosure Act 1779	19 Geo. 3. c. 78 Pr.	18 May 1779
An Act for dividing and enclosing the Open and Common Fields, Common Pastures, Common Meadows and other Commonable and Waste Lands of Idbury, Bowld and Foscott, within the Manor and Parish of Idbury, in the County of Oxford.
Calverton Inclosure Act 1779	19 Geo. 3. c. 79 Pr.	18 May 1779
An Act for dividing and enclosing the Open Fields, Meadows, Pastures, Commons, Forest and Waste Grounds, in the Parish of Calverton, in the County of Nottingham.
Making the exemplification of Mary Edward's will evidence in all British and Irish courts.	19 Geo. 3. c. 80 Pr.	18 May 1779
An Act for making the Exemplification of the last Will and Testament of Mary Edwards, deceased, Evidence in all the Courts of Law and Equity in Great Britain and Ireland.
Bonnevaux's Naturalization Act 1779	19 Geo. 3. c. 81 Pr.	18 May 1779
An Act for naturalizing Peter Daillé Bonnevaux.
Sellon's Naturalization Act 1779	19 Geo. 3. c. 82 Pr.	18 May 1779
An Act for naturalizing John Sellon.
Charuaud's Naturalization Act 1779	19 Geo. 3. c. 83 Pr.	18 May 1779
An Act for naturalizing James Charnaud.
Dalston's Estate Act 1779	19 Geo. 3. c. 84 Pr.	31 May 1779
An Act for appointing new Trustees in the Place of those deceased, for Sale of so much of the Estates, late of Sir William Dalston Knight, as will be sufficient for the Payment of his Debts and Legacies by his Will charged thereon.
Persehowse's Estate Act 1779	19 Geo. 3. c. 85 Pr.	31 May 1779
An Act for enabling the Trustees named in the Will of Richard Persehowse, late of Reynold's Hall, in the County of Stafford, Esquire, deceased, to borrow and take up at Interest, on Mortgage of the Freehold Estates late of the said Richard Persehowse, any Sum or Sums of Money, not exceeding the Sum of Three thousand three hundred Pounds, to be applied in or towards the Purchase of the Copyhold Estates late of the said Richard Persehowse.
Rous' Estate Act 1779	19 Geo. 3. c. 86 Pr.	31 May 1779
An Act for vesting in Trustees the Timber and Wood growing upon the Estate late belonging to Thomas Rous Esquire, deceased, in the County of Worcester, in Trust, to sell the same, and apply the Monies arising therefrom, towards discharging certain Incumbrances affecting the said Estate; and for the other Purposes therein mentioned.
Nicoll's Estate Act 1779	19 Geo. 3. c. 87 Pr.	31 May 1779
An Act for Sale of the Estates of the late John Nicoll of Bolton, in the County of York, Esquire, for Payment of his Debts.
Ecclesall Inclosure Act 1779	19 Geo. 3. c. 88 Pr.	31 May 1779
An Act for dividing and enclosing the several Open Commons, Moors and Waste Grounds, within the Manor and Township of Ecclesall, in the Parish of Sheffield, in the West Riding of the County of York.
Evenly or Bury Manor (Northamptonshire) Inclosure Act 1779	19 Geo. 3. c. 89 Pr.	31 May 1779
An Act for dividing and enclosing the Open Common Field and Commonable Lands and Grounds, within the Manor and Parish of Evenly, otherwise Bury Manor, in the County of Northampton.
Marquis of Carmarthen's Divorce Act 1779	19 Geo. 3. c. 90 Pr.	31 May 1779
An Act to dissolve the Marriage of Francis Osborne, Baron Osborne of Kiveton, in the County of York, commonly called Marquis of Carmarthen, with Lady Amelia D'Arcy Baroness Conyers, his now Wife, and to enable him to marry again; and for other Purposes therein mentioned.
Confirming and executing an award concerning disputes between Lord Edward and Lady Isabella Beaulieu, George Duke of Mongagu, Henry Duke and Elizabeth Duchess of Buccleugh and Charles William Earl of Dalkeith.	19 Geo. 3. c. 91 Pr.	17 June 1779
An Act for consirming and carrying into Execution, an Award touching certain Questions and Disputes between the Right Honourable Edward Lord Beaulieu and Isabella Lady Beaulieu his Wife, and the most Noble George Duke of Montagu, Henry Duke of Buccleugh, and Elizabeth Dutchess of Buccleugh his Wife, and the Right Honourable Charles William, eldest Son of the said Duke and Dutchess of Buccleugh, commonly called Earl of Dalkeith.
Eden's Estate Act 1779	19 Geo. 3. c. 92 Pr.	17 June 1779
An Act to enable the Trustees of certain Estates, situate in the Parishes of Saint Mary Redcliffe and Saint Thomas, or one of them, in the City of Bristol, given by Thomas Eden the Elder, late of Broadmarston, in the Parish of Pebworth, in the County of Gloucester, Gentleman, for charitable Uses, to grant Building Leases thereof.
Darsingham or Dersingham (Norfolk) Inclosure Act 1779	19 Geo. 3. c. 93 Pr.	17 June 1779
An Act for dividing, allotting and enclosing the several Whole Year Lands, Common Fields, Half Year Lands, Shack Meadows and Heaths, and other Commons, Waste and Commonable Lands, within the Parish of Darsingham, otherwise Dersingham, in the County of Norfolk.
Morland Inclosure Act 1779	19 Geo. 3. c. 94 Pr.	17 June 1779
An Act for dividing and enclosing the Commons or Moors and Waste Grounds, within the Manor or Lordship of Morland, in the Parish of Morland, in the County of Westmorland.
Chisledon Inclosure Act 1779	19 Geo. 3. c. 95 Pr.	17 June 1779
An Act for dividing, allotting and enclosing certain Open and Common Fields, Common Pastures and other Commonable Lands, Meadows and Waste Lands, within the Parish of Chisledon, in the County of Wilts.
Grimston Inclosure Act 1779	19 Geo. 3. c. 96 Pr.	17 June 1779
An Act for dividing, allotting and enclosing the Whole Year Lands and Brecks, Common Fields, Half Year Lands and Heaths, and Commons and Commonable and Waste Lands, within the Parish of Grimston, in the County of Norfolk.
Cranage Inclosure Act 1779	19 Geo. 3. c. 97 Pr.	17 June 1779
An Act for dividing and enclosing the Commons or Waste Grounds, within the Township of Cranage, in the County Palatine of Chester.
Hasland Inclosure Act 1779	19 Geo. 3. c. 98 Pr.	17 June 1779
An Act for dividing and enclosing the several Commons and Waste Grounds, within the Manor of Hasland, in the County of Derby.
Elksley Inclosure Act 1779	19 Geo. 3. c. 99 Pr.	17 June 1779
An Act to confirm and establish the Division and Allotment of certain Commons or Forests and Waste Lands, within the Parish of Elksley, in the County of Nottingham.
Taplow Inclosure Act 1779	19 Geo. 3. c. 100 Pr.	17 June 1779
An Act for dividing and enclosing the Open and Common Fields, Common Meadows, Common Pastures, Commonable Lands and Waste Grounds, within the Parish and Manor of Taplow, in the County of Buckingham.
Sealy's Divorce Act 1779	19 Geo. 3. c. 101 Pr.	17 June 1779
An Act to dissolve the Marriage of Henry Sealy with Ann Woodroffe his now Wife, and to enable him to marry again; and for other Purposes therein mentioned.
Sewell's Divorce Act 1779	19 Geo. 3. c. 102 Pr.	17 June 1779
An Act to dissolve the Marriage of Thomas Bailey Heath Sewell Esquire, with the Right Honourable Lady Elizabeth Birmingham his now Wife, and to enable him to marry again; and for other Purposes therein mentioned.
Bromfield's Divorce Act 1779	19 Geo. 3. c. 103 Pr.	17 June 1779
An Act to dissolve the Marriage of Charles Bromfeild with Ann Broom his now Wife, and to enable him to marry again; and for other Purposes therein mentioned.
Francois' Divorce Act 1779	19 Geo. 3. c. 104 Pr.	30 June 1779
An Act to dissolve the Marriage of Charles François Dumergue with Ann Catherine his now Wife, and to enable him to marry again; and for other Purposes.
Sleagill Inclosure Act 1779 (repealed)	19 Geo. 3. c. 105 Pr.	3 July 1779
An Act for dividing and enclosing the Open Wastes and Commons lying in the Manor of Sleagill, in the County of Westmorland. (Repealed by Sleagill Inclosure Act 1803 (43 Geo. 3. c. lxxvii))

=== Sources ===
- Pickering, Danby, ed. (1778). "Anno decimo nono Georgii III". The Statutes at Large. Vol. 32. Cambridge: Charles Bathurst. pp. 175–457 – via Google Books.
- Journals of the House of Commons. Vol. 37. London: His Majesty's Stationery Office. 1803. pp. 3–460 – via Google Books.
- Chronological Table of and Index to the Statutes. Vol. 1: To the End of the Session 59 Vict. Sess. 2 (1895) (13th ed.). London: Her Majesty's Stationery Office. 1896. pp. 135–137 – via Google Books.
- "Acts of the Parliament of Great Britain from 1779". legislation.gov.uk. The National Archives.

== See also ==
- List of acts of the Parliament of Great Britain
