= List of acts of the Parliament of Great Britain from 1777 =

This is a complete list of acts of the Parliament of Great Britain for the year 1777.

For acts passed until 1707, see the list of acts of the Parliament of England and the list of acts of the Parliament of Scotland. See also the list of acts of the Parliament of Ireland.

For acts passed from 1801 onwards, see the list of acts of the Parliament of the United Kingdom. For acts of the devolved parliaments and assemblies in the United Kingdom, see the list of acts of the Scottish Parliament, the list of acts of the Northern Ireland Assembly, and the list of acts and measures of Senedd Cymru; see also the list of acts of the Parliament of Northern Ireland.

The number shown after each act's title is its chapter number. Acts are cited using this number, preceded by the year(s) of the reign during which the relevant parliamentary session was held; thus the Union with Ireland Act 1800 is cited as "39 & 40 Geo. 3. c. 67", meaning the 67th act passed during the session that started in the 39th year of the reign of George III and which finished in the 40th year of that reign. Note that the modern convention is to use Arabic numerals in citations (thus "41 Geo. 3" rather than "41 Geo. III"). Acts of the last session of the Parliament of Great Britain and the first session of the Parliament of the United Kingdom are both cited as "41 Geo. 3".

Acts passed by the Parliament of Great Britain did not have a short title; however, some of these acts have subsequently been given a short title by acts of the Parliament of the United Kingdom (such as the Short Titles Act 1896).

Before the Acts of Parliament (Commencement) Act 1793 came into force on 8 April 1793, acts passed by the Parliament of Great Britain were deemed to have come into effect on the first day of the session in which they were passed. Because of this, the years given in the list below may in fact be the year before a particular act was passed.

== 17 Geo. 3 ==
Continuing the third session of the 14th Parliament of Great Britain, which met from 31 October 1776 until 6 June 1777.

This session was also traditionally cited as 17 G. 3.

=== Public acts ===
Short title	Citation	Royal assent
Long title
Frauds by Workmen Act 1777 (repealed)	17 Geo. 3. c. 56	2 June 1777
An Act for amending and rendering more effectual the several Laws now in being, for the more effectual preventing of Frauds and Abuses by Persons employed in the Manufacture of Hats, and in the Woollen, Linen, Fustian, Cotton, Iron, Leather, Fur, Hemp, Flax, Mohair, and Silk Manufactures; and also for making Provisions to prevent Frauds by Journeymen Dyers. (Repealed by Theft Act 1968 (c. 60))
Prints Copyright Act 1777 (repealed)	17 Geo. 3. c. 57	6 June 1777
An Act for more effectually securing the Property of Prints to Inventors and Engravers, by enabling them to sue for and recover Penalties in certain Cases. (Repealed by Copyright Act 1911 (1 & 2 Geo. 5. c. 46))
Warwick Gaol Act 1777 (repealed)	17 Geo. 3. c. 58	2 June 1777
An Act for enlarging the Publick Gaol of the County of Warwick; and for other Purposes therein mentioned. (Repealed by Statute Law (Repeals) Act 2008 (c. 12))
Rolls Estate Act 1777 (repealed)	17 Geo. 3. c. 59	6 June 1777
An Act to repeal an Act, made in the Twelfth Year of the Reign of King Charles the Second, intituled, "The Master of the Rolls empowered to make Leases for Years, in Order to new build the old Houses belonging to the Rolls;" (Note: Rolls Estate Act 1660 (12 Cha. 2. c. 36)) and for the better regulating the Method of granting Leases of the said Rolls Estate for the future; and for making Compensation to the Earl of Macclesfield and Sir Thomas Sewell, for their beneficial Rights and Interests in certain Leases made of the Rolls Estate; and for regulating the Method of making Leases of the said Estate for the future. (Repealed by Rolls Estate Act 1837 (7 Will. 4 & 1 Vict. c. 46))
Shoreditch (Hoxton Square) (Improvement) Act 1777 (repealed)	17 Geo. 3. c. 60	16 May 1777
An Act for enclosing and embellishing the Middle Part of Hoxton Square, in the Parish of Saint Leonard Shoreditch, in the County of Middlesex; and for extinguishing all Right of Common in and upon the said Square. (Repealed by London Government (Borough of Shoreditch) Order in Council 1901 (SR&O 1901/221))
Westminster (Streets) Act 1777	17 Geo. 3. c. 61	16 May 1777
An Act to enable the Dean and Chapter of the Collegiate Church of Saint Peter in Westminster, to open a Street from the South End of Long Ditch to the North End of Smith Street, and to widen Part of Tothill Street and of Long Ditch aforesaid; and to widen the Passage between Orchard Street and the new intended Street; and also to widen Wood Street, and to make a more commodious Entrance from the Broad Sanctuary into Dean's Yard, within the City and Liberty of Westminster.
Lincolnshire (Small Debts) Act 1777 (repealed)	17 Geo. 3. c. 62	6 June 1777
An Act for the more easy and speedy Recovery of small Debts, within the several Parishes of Surfleet, Gosberton, Quadring, Donington, Bicker, Swineshead, Wigtoft, Sutterton, Algarkirk, Fosdike, Kirton, Frampton, Wiberton, and Brothertost, within the Hundred of Kirton, in the Parts of Holland, in the County of Lincoln. (Repealed by Lincoln (Small Debts) Act 1778 (18 Geo. 3. c. 43))
Clerkenwell (Streets) Act 1777 (repealed)	17 Geo. 3. c. 63	2 June 1777
An Act to explain and amend an Act, made in the Fourteenth Year of the Reign of His present Majesty, intituled, "An Act for paving, repairing, lighting, and watching, the Streets and other publick Passages and Places, within that Part of the Parish of Clerkenwell called Saint James's, and removing Obstructions and Annoyances therein; for widening the Passage from Clerkenwell Green to the Parish Church, and for watching and lighting certain Highways within the said Parish;" (Note: Clerkenwell (Streets) Act 1774 (14 Geo. 3. c. 24)) for repairing the Highways in the said Parish, and cleansing the said Part of the said Parish; for widening the Passage from Clerkenwell Close to Rosoman's Street, and from Rosoman's Street to Saint John Street; and for building a Chapel in the said Parish. (Repealed by London Government (Borough of Finsbury) Order in Council 1901 (SR&O 1901/266))
Kensington (Poor Relief) Act 1777 (repealed)	17 Geo. 3. c. 64	2 June 1777
An Act for the better Relief and Employment of the Poor of the Parish of Saint Mary Abbotts Kensington, in the County of Middlesex; and for other Purposes therein mentioned. (Repealed by London Government (Borough of Kensington) Order in Council 1901 (SR&O 1901/271))
Bedford Level (Drainage) Act 1777	17 Geo. 3. c. 65	27 March 1777
An Act for amending and rendering more effectual an Act, made in the Twenty-second Year of the Reign of King George the Second, intituled, "An Act for draining and preserving certain Fen Lands and Low Grounds in the several Parishes of Sutton Mepal, Witcham, Chatteris, Doddington, and a Place called Byal Fen, in the Isle of Ely and County of Cambridge, and also in the Parishes of Somersham and Pidley with Fenton, in the County of Huntingdon;" (Note: Isle of Ely Drainage Act 1748 (22 Geo. 2. c. 11)) so far as the same relates to the Fen Lands and Low Grounds, lying in the Parishes of Sutton Mepal, Witcham, Chatteris, and a Place called Byal Fen, in the Isle of Ely.
Mile End Night Watch Act 1777 (repealed)	17 Geo. 3. c. 66	2 June 1777
An Act for establishing a Nightly Watch within the Hamlet of Mile-End Old Town, in the Parish of Saint Dunstan Stepney, otherwise Stebonheath, in the County of Middlesex. (Repealed by Statute Law (Repeals) Act 1977 (c. 18))
Chester Canal Act 1777 (repealed)	17 Geo. 3. c. 67	2 June 1777
An Act for varying and enlarging the Powers of an Act, made in the Twelfth Year of the Reign of His present Majesty, (Note: Chester Canal Act 1772 (12 Geo. 3. c. 75)) for making a navigable Cut or Canal from the River Dee, within the Liberties of the City of Chester, to or near Middlewich and Nantwich, in the County of Chester. (Repealed by Ellesmere and Chester Canals Unification Act 1813 (53 Geo. 3. c. lxxx) and Ellesmere and Chester Canal Act 1827 (7 & 8 Geo. 4. c. cii))
Maisemore Bridge Act 1777	17 Geo. 3. c. 68	6 June 1777
An Act for re-building the Bridge over the River Severn, at Maisemore, near the City of Gloucester; for raising, widening, and securing Over's Causeway, leading from the said City towards Maisemore aforesaid; and for enforcing the proper paving and cleansing of the several Streets within the said City; and for removing Nuisances and Annoyances therefrom, and preventing the like for the future.
Erewash Canal Act 1777	17 Geo. 3. c. 69	30 April 1777
An Act for making and maintaining a Navigable Cut or Canal from the River Trent, in the Lordship of Sawley and Long Eaton, in the County of Derby, to or near Langley Bridge, in the Counties of Derby and Nottingham.
Lincoln (Drainage) Act 1777 (repealed)	17 Geo. 3. c. 70	6 June 1777
An Act for dividing and enclosing the Open Common Fields, Meadows, Dales, and Common Fen, within the Parish of Billinghay, in the County of Lincoln; and for draining and preserving the said Dales and Common Fen, and also certain enclosed Low Lands thereto adjoining, in the said Parish. (Repealed by Lincolnshire Drainage Act 1840 (3 & 4 Vict. c. xc))
Rugby School and Alms-houses Act 1777	17 Geo. 3. c. 71 (Note: Also cited as 17 Geo. 3. c. 57 Pr.) (Note: This act was given royal assent with the wording used for a private act.)	30 April 1777
An act to enable the feoffees and trustees of an estate in the county of Middlesex, given by Lawrence Sheriff, for the founding and maintaining a school (Note: Rugby School.) and alms houses at Rugby, in the county of Warwick, to sell part of the said estate, or to grant leases thereof, or of any part thereof, and to effectuate the other purposes therein mentioned.
Wilts Roads Act 1777 (repealed)	17 Geo. 3. c. 72	2 December 1776
An Act to enlarge the Term and Powers of an Act, made in the Second Year of His present Majesty's Reign, (Note: Wilts Roads (No. 3) Act 1762 (2 Geo. 3. c. 59)) for repairing, widening, turning, and shortening the Road leading from the Turnpike Road on Farrard's Common, in the Parish of Bradford, through Holt and Melksham, to Homan's Stile, in the Parish of Laycock, in the County of Wilts; and for completing a Communication between the said Road and the Bath Turnpike Road upon Kingsdown Hill, in the same County. (Repealed by Road through Holt and Melksham (Wiltshire) Act 1826 (7 Geo. 4. c. xviii))
Yorks Roads Act 1777 (repealed)	17 Geo. 3. c. 73	2 December 1776
An Act for continuing the Term, and altering and enlarging the Powers of so much of an Act, made in the Twenty-sixth Year of the Reign of His late Majesty King George the Second, (Note: Bradford and Wakefield Road Act 1753 (26 Geo. 2. c. 83)) for repairing certain Roads therein mentioned, as relates to the Roads from Kighley to Wakefield, and from Kighley to Halifax, and from Dudley Hill, through Beckwith-Shaw, to Killinghall, and from Beckwith-Shaw to the South-west Corner of Harrogate Enclosures, in the West Riding of the County of York. (Repealed by Road from Keighley to Bradford Act 1815 (55 Geo. 3. c. li), Road from Dudley Hill and from Beckwithshaw Act 1816 (56 Geo. 3. c. xlviii) and Bradford and Wakefield Road Act 1819 (59 Geo. 3. c. lxxx))
Sussex Roads Act 1777 (repealed)	17 Geo. 3. c. 74	3 March 1777
An Act for repairing and widening the Road from a Place called Crouch Hill, in the Parish of Henfield, to the Turnpike Road leading from Brighthelmstone (Note: Brighthelmstone is now known as Brighton.) to Cuckfield, and from the East Side of the said Turnpike Road to the Town of Ditchling, in the County of Sussex. (Repealed by Road from Pyecombe to Staplefield Common Act 1808 (48 Geo. 3. c. ci), Henfield and Ditchling Road Act 1818 (58 Geo. 3. c. viii) and Roads from Henfield Act 1834 (4 & 5 Will. 4. c. x))
Kidderminster Roads Act 1777 (repealed)	17 Geo. 3. c. 75	3 March 1777
An Act to repeal an Act of the Thirty-third year of His late Majesty, (Note: Worcester Roads Act 1759 (33 Geo. 2. c. 50)) for amending, widening, and keeping in Repair several Roads leading from the Market-house, in the Town of Kidderminster, in the County of Worcester; and also to repeal so much of Two Acts of the Tenth of His late Majesty, (Note: Worcester Roads Act 1736 (10 Geo. 2. c. 5)) and the Seventh of His present Majesty, (Note: Worcester Roads Act 1766 (7 Geo. 3. c. 65)) as relate to the Road from The Mitre Oak to a Farm House called Goodness, and from Titton Brook to the Hamlet of Wribbenhall, in the said County; and to discontinue the Powers of an Act of the Eighth of His present Majesty, (Note: Droitwich Roads Act 1768 (8 Geo. 3. c. 39)) so far as relate to the Road from the Cross of the Hands near Goodness Farm, to a Place called The Spout; and for more effectually amending, widening, and keeping in Repair the several Roads described in the first-mentioned Act, and also several other Roads therein mentioned. (Repealed by Kidderminster Roads Act 1821 (1 & 2 Geo. 4. c. xci))
Chester Roads Act 1777 (repealed)	17 Geo. 3. c. 76	3 March 1777
An Act for continuing the Term of Two Acts, passed in the Fourth (Note: Cheshire Roads Act 1730 (4 Geo. 2. c. 3)) and Twenty-fourth (Note: Lawton and Cranage Road Act 1750 (24 Geo. 2. c. 33)) Years of His late Majesty King George the Second, for repairing the Roads leading from the most Southern Part of Butt Lane, (Note: Butt Lane in north Staffordshire. 53°04′53″N 2°15′43″W) in the Parish of Lawton, in the County Palatine of Chester, to Lawton, and from thence to Henshall's Smithy upon Cranage Green, (Note: Cranage in Cheshire. 53°13′33″N 2°22′53″W) in the said County. (Repealed by Roads to and from Lawton (Cheshire) Act 1820 (1 Geo. 4. c. xxxviii))
Yorks Roads (No. 2) Act 1777 (repealed)	17 Geo. 3. c. 77	3 March 1777
An Act to enlarge the Term and Powers of an Act, made in the Twenty-fifth Year of the Reign of His late Majesty, (Note: Yorkshire Roads (No. 3) Act 1751 (25 Geo. 2. c. 58)) for repairing the Roads from the Town of Leeds, through Harwood, to the South-west Corner of the Enclosures of Harrogate, and from thence in Two Branches, (One through Ripley over Burage Green, and the other through Knaresborough and Boroughbridge), to Ripon, and from thence to the First Rill of Water or Watercourse on Hutton Moor, in the County of York, and for repairing the Sloughs or Rutts on the said Moor; so far as the same relates to the Road leading from the South-west Corner of the Enclosures of Harrogate, through Knaresborough, to Boroughbridge. (Repealed by Leeds to Harrogate Road Act 1819 (59 Geo. 3. c. i) and Annual Turnpike Acts Continuance Act 1869 (32 & 33 Vict. c. 90))
Yorks Roads (No. 3) Act 1777 (repealed)	17 Geo. 3. c. 78	3 March 1777
An Act for enlarging the Term, and continuing the Powers of Two Acts of Parliament, One passed in the Twenty-fifth Year of the Reign of His late Majesty King George the Second, intituled, "An Act for repairing the Roads from the Town of Leeds, through Harwood, to the South-west Corner of the Enclosures of Harrogate, and from thence in Two Branches (One through Ripley, over Burage Green, and the other through Knaresborough and Boroughbridge) to Ripon, and from thence to the First Rill of Water or Watercourse on Hutton Moor, in the County of York; and for repairing the Sloughs or Rutts on the said Moor;" and the other, passed in the Twenty-ninth Year of His said Majesty's Reign, (Note: Yorkshire Roads Act 1756 (29 Geo. 2. c. 71)) to explain and amend the said first-mentioned Act, with respect to the Road from the Town of Leeds, through Harwood, to the South-west Corner of the Enclosures of Harrogate. (Repealed by Road from Leeds to Harrogate Act 1839 (2 & 3 Vict. c. xxxii))
Saltash Roads Act 1777 (repealed)	17 Geo. 3. c. 79	27 March 1777
An Act for continuing the Term, and enlarging the Powers of an Act, made in the Second Year of the Reign of His present Majesty, (Note: Saltash Roads Act 1762 (2 Geo. 3. c. 43)) for repairing and widening several Roads in the Counties of Cornwall and Devon, leading to the Borough of Saltash, in the County of Cornwall. (Repealed by Saltash Roads Act 1823 (4 Geo. 4. c. vi) and the Newton Bushell, South Bovey and Moretonhampstead Roads Act 1826 (7 Geo. 4. c. xcii))
Yorks Roads (No. 4) Act 1777 (repealed)	17 Geo. 3. c. 80	27 March 1777
An Act for enlarging the Term and Powers of Two Acts of Parliament, One passed in the Twenty fifth Year of the Reign of His late Majesty King George the Second, intituled, "An Act for repairing the Roads from the Town of Leeds through Harwood, to the South West Corner of the Enclosures of Harrogate; and from thence in Two Branches, (One through Ripley over Burage Green, and the other through Knaresborough and Boroughbridge), to Ripon, and from thence to the First Rill of Water or Watercourse on Hutton Moor, in the County of York; and for repairing the Sloughs or Rutts on the said Moor;" and the other, passed in the Twenty-ninth Year of His said Majesty's Reign, to explain and amend the said first-mentioned Act, with respect to those Parts of the said Roads from Harrogate through Ripley and Ripon, to the North East Corner of Hutton Moor, and from the East End of Kirby Hill Moor to the Town of Ripon aforesaid. (Repealed by Harrogate and Hutton Moor and Kirkby Hill Moor and Ripon Roads Act 1814 (54 Geo. 3. c. cci))
Brent Bridge to Plymouth Road Act 1777 (repealed)	17 Geo. 3. c. 81	27 March 1777
An Act for continuing the Term, and enlarging the Powers of an Act, made in the Thirty-first Year of the Reign of His late Majesty, (Note: Devon Roads Act 1757 (31 Geo. 2. c. 51)) for repairing the High Road leading from Brent Bridge, in the County of Devon, to Gasking Gate, in or near the Borough of Plymouth, in the said County. (Repealed by Brent Bridge and Plymouth (Gasking Street) Road Act 1841 (4 & 5 Vict. c. xxxii) (Note: Incorrectly cited as "4-5 V c xxxi" in the Chronological Table of the Statutes.))
Bucks Roads Act 1777 (repealed)	17 Geo. 3. c. 82	27 March 1777
An Act for enlarging the Term and Powers of Three several Acts of Parliament, for repairing the Roads therein mentioned, in the County of Bucks, so far as the said Acts relate to the Road from the West End of the Town of Wendover, to the End of a Lane called Oak Lane, next the great Road called The Oxford Road; and also Half a Mile of Road next from the River Colne, towards Beconsfield, in the said County. (Repealed by Roads from Wendover and from the River Colne Act 1812 (52 Geo. 3. c. xxx) and Wendover and Oak Lane, and River Colne and Beaconsfield Roads Act 1833 (3 & 4 Will. 4. c. xii))
Wilts and Dorset Roads Act 1777 (repealed)	17 Geo. 3. c. 83	27 March 1777
An Act for continuing the Term of an Act, made in the Twenty-ninth Year of the Reign of His late Majesty, (Note: Wiltshire and Dorset Roads Act 1756 (29 Geo. 2. c. 54)) for repairing and widening the Road from the Top of Harnham Hill, near the City of New Sarum, in the County of Wilts, through the Towns of Blandford Forum and Dorchester, to a certain Intrenchment on Askerwell Hill, in the County of Dorset; and from the Index Post on the Side of Harnham Hill aforesaid, to a House called Master Baker's Farm House, in the said County of Wilts. (Repealed by Harnham Hill, Blandford and Dorchester Road Act 1828 (9 Geo. 4. c. xxi))
Bagshot to Hertford Bridge Hill Road Act 1777 (repealed)	17 Geo. 3. c. 84	27 March 1777
An Act for enlarging the Term and continuing the Powers granted by an Act, passed in the Thirtieth Year of the Reign of His late Majesty King George the Second, (Note: Surrey and Southampton Roads Act 1757 (30 Geo. 2. c. 61)) for repairing the Road from a Place called The Golden Farmer, (Note: The Golden Farmer Inn, later named the Jolly Farmer, was located at the junction of the A325 and A30 between Camberley and Bagshot. 51°20′56″N 0°42′48″W) near Bagshot in the County of Surrey, to Hertfordbridge-hill, (Note: The village of Hartfordbridge in Hampshire.) in the County of Southampton. (Repealed by Bagshot and Basingstoke and Odiham Roads Act 1819 (59 Geo. 3. c. vii))
Leominster Roads Act 1777 (repealed)	17 Geo. 3. c. 85	27 March 1777
An Act to enlarge the Term and Powers of Two Acts, passed in the Second (Note: Leominster Roads Act 1728 (2 Geo. 2. c. 13)) and Twenty-second (Note: Leominster Roads Act 1748 (22 Geo. 2. c. 15)) Years of His late Majesty's Reign, for repairing the several Roads therein mentioned, leading into the Town of Leominster, in the County of Hereford. (Repealed by Leominster Roads Act 1800 (39 & 40 Geo. 3. c. lxv))
Poole to Blandford Road Act 1777 (repealed)	17 Geo. 3. c. 86	27 March 1777
An Act for continuing the Term, and altering and enlarging several of the Powers contained in an Act, made in the Seventh Year of the Reign of His present Majesty, (Note: Dorset and Somerset Roads Act 1766 (7 Geo. 3. c. 82)) so far as the same relate to the Road from the Turnpike Road between the Town and County of Poole and Winbourn Minster, in the County of Dorset, to the Turnpike Road in the Parish of Brianston, in the said County of Dorset, which leads from Blandford Forum to Dorchester. (Repealed by Vale of Blackmoor Turnpike Roads Act 1824 (5 Geo. 4. c. cxlv))
Elland to Leeds Road Act 1777 (repealed)	17 Geo. 3. c. 87	27 March 1777
An Act for enlarging the Terms and Powers of Two Acts, passed in the Fourteenth (Note: Elland to Leeds Road Act 1740 (14 Geo. 2. c. 25)) and Twenty-sixth (Note: Elland to Leeds Road Act 1753 (26 Geo. 2. c. 61)) Years of His late Majesty's Reign, for repairing the Road leading from Ealand to the Town of Leeds, in the West Riding of the County of York. (Repealed by Road from Ealand to Leeds Act 1827 (7 & 8 Geo. 4. c. lxix))
Oxford Roads Act 1777 (repealed)	17 Geo. 3. c. 88	30 April 1777
An Act for enlarging the Term, and altering the Powers of an Act, made in the Twenty-eighth Year of the Reign of His late Majesty, (Note: Warwick and Oxford Roads Act 1755 (28 Geo. 2. c. 46)) for repairing and widening several Roads therein mentioned, in the Counties of Warwick and Oxford, so far as relates to the Road from the Guide Post in the Village of Adderbury, through Kidlington, to the Mile-way leading towards the City of Oxford. (Repealed by Adderbury and Oxford Road Act 1797 (37 Geo. 3. c. 170))
Dorset, Devon and Somerset Roads Act 1777 (repealed)	17 Geo. 3. c. 89	27 March 1777
An Act to enlarge the Term and Powers of an Act, passed in the Twenty-sixth Year of the Reign of His late Majesty King George the Second, (Note: Wiltshire, Dorset and Somerset Roads Act 1753 (26 Geo. 2. c. 60)) for repairing and widening the Road from the Half-way House in the Parish of Lower Compton, in the County of Dorset, through the Towns of Yeovil, Crewkerne, and Chard, to the East End of the Town of Axminster, in the County of Devon, and several other Roads round the Town of Yeovil, in the County of Somerset; and for amending Two Roads, leading from Vagg Hollow, in the Parish of Yeovil, and the Road from Chard to Cheeseway Ash, and from White Down to Perry Street, in Chard, and from thence to the Turnpike Road near Tytherleigh Inn, in the said County of Dorset. (Repealed by Dorset, Devon and Somerset Roads Act 1800 (39 & 40 Geo. 3. c. lxi))
Yorks and Lancaster Roads Act 1777 (repealed)	17 Geo. 3. c. 90	27 March 1777
An Act for continuing the Term, and altering and enlarging the Powers of an Act, made in the Thirty-third Year of the Reign of His late Majesty, (Note: Yorks and Lancaster Roads Act 1759 (33 Geo. 2. c. 48)) for diverting, altering, widening, repairing, and amending the Roads from the Town of Halifax, and from Sowerby Bridge, in the County of York, by Todmorden, to Burnley and Littleborough, in the County of Lancaster. (Repealed by Halifax and Sowerby Bridge and Burnley and Littleborough Roads Act 1800 (39 & 40 Geo. 3. c. xiii) and Todmorden and Burnley, Littleborough, and Halifax Roads Act 1821 (1 & 2 Geo. 4. c. cxi))
Sussex Roads (No. 2) Act 1777 (repealed)	17 Geo. 3. c. 91	3 March 1777
An Act for repairing and widening the Road leading from The Maypole, in the Town of Henfield, over Poynings Common, to the Town of Brighthelmstone, and from Poynings Common aforesaid, to Highcross, in the Parish of Albourne, and from thence, for the Distance of Two Furlongs of the Road or Lane leading towards Twineham, and from the Marle Pit, near the Bottom of Saddlescombe Hill, in the Parish of Newtimber, to the Marle Pit fronting Newtimber Broad Lane, in the same Parish, in the County of Sussex. (Repealed by Roads from Henfield and from Poyning's Common Act 1817 (57 Geo. 3. c. iii) and Annual Turnpike Acts Continuance Act 1876 (39 & 40 Vict. c. 39))
Derby Roads Act 1777 (repealed)	17 Geo. 3. c. 92	3 March 1777
An Act for repealing so much of Two Acts, made in the Eleventh (Note: Derby Roads Act 1737 (11 Geo. 2. c. 33)) and Seventeenth (Note: Derby Roads Act 1743 (17 Geo. 2. c. 20)) Years of the Reign of King George the Second, for repairing several Roads leading to and from the Town of Derby, in the County of Derby, as relates to the Road leading from the Gaol Bridge, in the said Town of Derby, through the Town of Ashborne, to Hurdloe House, in the said County; for making more effectual Provision for the Repair of the said Road; and for enabling the Trustees to alter Part of the Course of the present Road between Ashborne and the New Inn Turnpike. (Repealed by Road from Derby to Hurdloe House Act 1805 (45 Geo. 3. c. i) and Road from Derby to Hurdloe House and Compton Branch Act 1828 (9 Geo. 4. c. lxxix))
Wilts and Somerset Roads Act 1777 (repealed)	17 Geo. 3. c. 93	30 April 1777
An Act for continuing the Term and Powers of an Act, made in the Twenty-ninth Year of the Reign of His late Majesty, (Note: Wincanton Roads Act 1756 (29 Geo. 2. c. 49)) for repairing and widening the Road from the Eighteen Mile Stone beyond Willoughby-Hedge, through the Town of Mere, in the County of Wilts, and through Wincanton to Charltonhouthorn, and from thence to Milborne Port; and from Willoughby-Hedge aforesaid to the West End of Long Lane, in Kilmington, and from Wincanton aforesaid to the Sherborn Turnpike Cross-Gate on Cattle-Hill, and from Wincanton to Sparkford, in the County of Somerset. (Repealed by Wincanton Roads Act 1818 (58 Geo. 3. c. xlv) and Annual Turnpike Acts Continuance Act 1873 (36 & 37 Vict. c. 90))
Bedford Roads Act 1777 (repealed)	17 Geo. 3. c. 94	3 March 1777
An Act for repairing and widening the Road from Stall-gate Close, at the South-west End of the Town of Bedford, to the Town of Ampthill, and from the said Town of Ampthill to Woburn Park, in the County of Bedford; and also the Road branching out of the same, in Kempston Field, to the Turnpike Road leading from Hitchin to the said Town of Bedford. (Repealed by Bedford and Woburn Road and Kempston Field Branch Act 1819 (59 Geo. 3. c. ci) and Bedford and Woburn Road Act 1840 (3 & 4 Vict. c. c))
Bruton Roads Act 1777 (repealed)	17 Geo. 3. c. 95	30 April 1777
An Act for continuing the Term, and altering and enlarging the Powers, of an Act of Parliament, made in the Twenty-ninth Year of the Reign of His late Majesty, (Note: Bruton Roads Act 1756 (29 Geo. 2. c. 50)) for repairing and widening several Roads leading from and near the Town of Brewton, in the County of Somerset; and for repairing and widening the Street from the North or North East End of Coombe Street, along Patwell Street, in the said Town of Brewton, to the South or South East Side of Dymond's River. (Repealed by Wiltshire and Somerset Roads Act 1793 (33 Geo. 3. c. 155) and Bruton (or Brewton) Roads Act 1831 (1 Will. 4. c. lxvi))
Monmouth Roads Act 1777 (repealed)	17 Geo. 3. c. 96	30 April 1777
An Act to enlarge the Term and Powers of an Act, passed in the Twenty-eighth Year of the Reign of King George the Second, (Note: Monmouth Roads Act 1755 (28 Geo. 2. c. 31)) for repairing and widening the several Roads therein mentioned, leading to, through, and from the Town of Monmouth. (Repealed by Monmouth Roads Act 1831 (1 & 2 Will. 4. c. xviii))
Sussex Roads (No. 3) Act 1777 (repealed)	17 Geo. 3. c. 97	3 March 1777
An Act for repealing an Act made in the Twenty-seventh Year of His late Majesty King George the Second, (Note: Sussex Roads Act 1754 (27 Geo. 2. c. 24)) for amending, widening, and keeping in Repair, the Road leading from Union Point, near the Town of Uckfield, in the County of Sussex, to Langney Bridge, in the Parish of Westham, in the said County, and for more effectually repairing the said Road; and also for amending, widening, and keeping in Repair, the Road from the Side-Gate on the Horsebridge Turnpike Road, in the Parish of Hellingly, to the Turnpike Road leading from Cross-in-Hand to Burwash, in the said County. (Repealed by Uckfield and Eastbourne, and Horsebridge and Cross in Hand Roads Act 1823 (4 Geo. 4. c. xii))
Wilts Roads (No. 2) Act 1777 (repealed)	17 Geo. 3. c. 98	3 March 1777
An Act for repairing and widening the Road from Combe Bridge, through Winsley and Bradford, to Staverton Bridge, and to the Trowbridge Road on Ashton Common; and also the Road from Bradford Bridge to Cockhill Gate, all in the County of Wilts; and for making effectual Provision for maintaining a Bridge over the River Avon, at Stokeford, in the same County. (Repealed by Wiltshire and Somerset Roads and Stokeford Bridge Act 1798 (38 Geo. 3. c. viii))
Wilts and Somerset Roads (No. 2) Act 1777 (repealed)	17 Geo. 3. c. 99	27 March 1777
An Act for amending and keeping in Repair the Road from the Town of Warminster, in the County of Wilts, to a Place where the Roads to Bath and Bristol divide, and from the Town of Frome to the Town of Beckington, in the County of Somerset; and for repealing an Act, made in the Twenty-fifth Year of the Reign of His late Majesty, (Note: Wiltshire Roads (No. 2) Act 1751 (25 Geo. 2. c. 12)) relating to the said Roads; and for repairing the Road from or near the Red Lion, in the Parish of Woolverton, in the said County of Somerset, to Rode Bridge, and from the said Bridge to the Turnpike Road leading from Trowbridge by White Trough, to Beckington aforesaid. (Repealed by Roads from Warminster and from Frome and from Wolverton Act 1812 (52 Geo. 3. c. lvi))
Merioneth, Montgomery, Denbigh and Salop Roads Act 1777 (repealed)	17 Geo. 3. c. 100	27 March 1777
An Act for repairing and widening several Roads leading to and from the Towns of Bala and Dolgelley, in the County of Merioneth, and other Roads therein mentioned, in the Counties of Montgomery, Denbigh, and Salop. (Repealed by Roads in Merioneth, Montgomery, Denbigh and Salop Act 1819 (59 Geo. 3. c. xcviii) and Llanrwst Roads Act 1837 (7 Will. 4 & 1 Vict. c. xxxv))
Derby Roads (No. 2) Act 1777 (repealed)	17 Geo. 3. c. 101	27 March 1777
An Act for repealing so much of Three Acts, made in the Eleventh, (Note: Derby Roads Act 1737 (11 Geo. 2. c. 33)) Seventeenth, (Note: Derby Roads Act 1743 (17 Geo. 2. c. 20)) and Thirty-third (Note: Derby Roads Act 1759 (33 Geo. 2. c. 33)) Years of the Reign of King George the Second, for repairing several Roads leading to and from the Town of Derby, in the County of Derby, as relates to the Road leading from the North Side of Cavendish Bridge, in the said County of Derby, through the said Town of Derby to Brassington, in the said County, and for making more effectual Provision for the Repair of the said Road. (Repealed by Road from Cavendish Bridge to Brassington Act 1806 (46 Geo. 3. c. xcviii) and Road from Cavendish Bridge to Hulland Ward (Derbyshire) Act 1827 (7 & 8 Geo. 4. c. l))
Yorks Roads (No. 5) Act 1777 (repealed)	17 Geo. 3. c. 102	27 March 1777
An Act for repairing and widening the Road from the Town of Skipton, to the Turnpike Road leading from Leeds to Ripon near Okbeck, in the Township of Bilton with Harrogate, and from thence to communicate with the Road leading from Knaresborough to Wetherby, in the West Riding of the County of York. (Repealed by Skipton and Knaresborough Road Act 1821 (1 & 2 Geo. 4. c. xvi) and Annual Turnpike Acts Continuance Act 1876 (39 & 40 Vict. c. 39))
Dorset Roads Act 1777	17 Geo. 3. c. 103	30 April 1777
An Act for amending, widening, and keeping in Repair, the Road leading from Crookhill, in the Parish of Chickrell, to the Turnpike Road leading from Bridport to Bridport Harbour, and several other Roads therein mentioned, in the County of Dorset.
Poole Roads Act 1777 (repealed)	17 Geo. 3. c. 104	30 April 1777
An Act for more effectually amending, widening, and keeping in Repair, several Roads therein mentioned, leading from a Gate in the Town and County of Poole, called Poole-Gate; and for repealing Two Acts of Parliament, of the Twenty-ninth (Note: Poole Roads Act 1756 (29 Geo. 2. c. 52)) and Thirtieth (Note: Poole Roads Act 1757 (30 Geo. 2. c. 66)) Years of His late Majesty, relating to the said Roads; and also for applying a certain Sum of Money therein mentioned, towards paving and repairing a certain Street or Way within the said Town and County. (Repealed by Poole Roads Act 1799 (39 Geo. 3. c. lxv), Poole Roads Act 1818 (58 Geo. 3. c. xliv) and Poole Roads Act 1836 (6 & 7 Will. 4. c. xlvii))
Asthall to Buckland Road Act 1777 (repealed)	17 Geo. 3. c. 105	30 April 1777
An Act for amending, widening, and keeping in Repair, the Road leading from the Turnpike Road, in the Parish of Asthall, in the County of Oxford, to the Turnpike Road at or near Buckland, in the County of Berks. (Repealed by Asthall and Buckland Road Act 1799 (39 Geo. 3. c. lxxvi), Asthall and Buckland Road Act 1820 (1 Geo. 4. c. lxxxi) and Asthall and Buckland Road Act 1852 (15 & 16 Vict. c. cxxxix) (Note: The Chronological Table of the Statutes cites the first of these as "59 G 3 c xci", which is the Huddersfield and Penistone Road Act 1819 and unrelated to this road.))
Halifax to Sheffield Road Act 1777 (repealed)	17 Geo. 3. c. 106	30 April 1777
An Act for repairing and widening the Road from the Town of Halifax, in the West Riding of the County of York, to the Town of Sheffield, in the same Riding. (Repealed by Halifax and Huddersfield Road Act 1818 (58 Geo. 3. c. xxxiii), Halifax to Sheffield Road (First District) Act 1824 (5 Geo. 4. c. ciii) and Halifax to Sheffield Road (Third District) Act 1826 (7 Geo. 4. c. cxxvii))
Dumfries Roads Act 1777 (repealed)	17 Geo. 3. c. 107	7 May 1777
An Act for repairing and widening several Roads in the County of Dumfries, and for converting the Statute Labour within the said County into Money; and for applying the same towards repairing the Highways within the same County. (Repealed by Dumfriesshire Roads Act 1798 (38 Geo. 3. c. ix))
Leicester Roads Act 1777 (repealed)	17 Geo. 3. c. 108	7 May 1777
An Act for amending the Road from the South East End of the Town of Loughborough, in the County of Leicester, to Derby Bridge, near the Rushes, and from the said Bridge to the South End of Cavendish Bridge, in the same County. (Repealed by Road from Loughborough to Cavendish Bridge Act 1827 (7 & 8 Geo. 4. c. lxxiv) (Note: Incorrectly cited as "7-8 G 4 c lxxxiv" in the Chronological Table of the Statutes.))
Lincoln Roads Act 1777 (repealed)	17 Geo. 3. c. 109	16 May 1777
An Act for enlarging the Term and Powers of an Act, made in the Twenty-ninth Year of the Reign of King George the Second, (Note: Lincoln Roads Act 1756 (29 Geo. 2. c. 84)) for repairing and widening certain Roads leading to and from the City of Lincoln; and for repairing and widening the Roads from the Termination of the present Turnpike Road, at the Foot of Bracebridge Bridge, over the said Bridge Westward, to the Extremity of the County of Lincoln, near a Place called Potter-hill; and from the Termination of the present Turnpike Road, at the Foot of Canwick-hill Southward, to a Windmill at the Top of the said Hill. (Repealed by Lincoln Roads Act 1841 (4 & 5 Vict. c. cviii))
Durham Roads Act 1777 (repealed)	17 Geo. 3. c. 110	16 May 1777
An Act for repairing and widening the Road from Gateshead, in the County of Durham, to the Church Lane near Ryton Lane-head; and from the Bar Moor to the Hexham Turnpike Road, near Dilston Bar, in the County of Northumberland; and also the Road from Mickley Bank to Lead-hill or Silverhill; and for making a Road cross certain Grounds belonging to Crozier Surtees Esquire, in the Parish of Ryton, in the County, of Durham. (Repealed by Road from Gateshead and from the Bar Moor Act 1799 (39 Geo. 3. c. li))
Denbigh Roads Act 1777 (repealed)	17 Geo. 3. c. 111	16 May 1777
An Act for enlarging the Term and Powers of an Act, made in the ninth Year of the Reign of His present Majesty, intituled, "An Act for repairing and widening the Road leading from Tal y Cafn Ferry, (Note: The ferry across the River Conwy at Tal-y-Cafn was replaced by a bridge in 1897. 53°13′45″N 3°49′19″W) in the County of Caernarvon, and through the Towns of Conway, Bangor, and Caernarvon, to the Town of Pwllhely, in the same County;" (Note: Carnarvon Roads Act 1769 (9 Geo. 3. c. 77)) and also for repairing and widening the Roads from Tal y Cafn Ferry aforesaid, on the Denbighshire Side of the River Conway, to join the Turnpike Road between Conway and Saint Asaph, at a Place called Sarn y Mynech; and from the Turnpike Road between Bangor and Conway, at the Village of Aber, over Bwlch y Ddwyfaen Mountain, to Tal y Cafn Ferry aforesaid, and from thence to the Town of Llanrwst, in the County of Denbigh. (Repealed by Conway and Pwllheli Road Act 1832 (2 & 3 Will. 4. c. lx))

=== Private acts ===
Short title	Citation	Royal assent
Long title
George Duke of Manchester's Estate Act 1777	17 Geo. 3. c. 6 Pr.	3 March 1777
An Act for vesting the several Rectories, Parsonages, Churches, and Chapels, of Rockburne, Breamore, South Charford, Hale, Whitsbury, and Quidesley, with the Glebe Lands, Tythes, and other Appurtenances thereto respectively belonging, Part of the Settled Estates of the Most Noble George Duke of Manchester, in Trustees, upon certain Trusts therein expressed; and for settling other Lands and Hereditaments of the said Duke, in lieu thereof, to the several Uses therein mentioned.
Thorpe Malsor Inclosure Act 1777	17 Geo. 3. c. 7 Pr.	3 March 1777
An Act for dividing and enclosing the Common and Open Fields, Common Meadows, and Common Pastures, within the Manor and Parish of Thorpe Malsor, in the County of Northampton.
Tansor Inclosure 1777	17 Geo. 3. c. 8 Pr.	3 March 1777
An Act for dividing and enclosing the Common and Open Fields, Meadows, Commonable Lands, and Waste Grounds, in the Parish of Tansor, in the County of Northampton.
Enabling the mayor, aldermen and burgesses of Great Torrington (Devon) to grant part of Great Torrington Common to William Callon.	17 Geo. 3. c. 9 Pr.	3 March 1777
An Act to enable the Mayor, Aldermen, and Burgesses, of the Town of Great Torrington, in the County of Devon, and other Trustees, to grant Part of the Common or Waste Lands called Great Torrington Common to William Callon, pursuant to an Agreement for that Purpose; and other the Purposes therein mentioned.
Westergate Common in Aldingborne (Sussex) Inclosure Act 1777	17 Geo. 3. c. 10 Pr.	3 March 1777
An Act for dividing and enclosing an Open Waste or Common, called Westergate Common, in the Parish of Aldingborne, in the County of Sussex.
Hatherne Inclosure Act 1777	17 Geo. 3. c. 11 Pr.	3 March 1777
An Act for dividing and enclosing the Open Fields, Meadows, Pastures, Commons or Waste Grounds, within the Lordship or Liberty, and Parish of Hatherne, in the County of Leicester.
Shepshead Inclosure Act 1777	17 Geo. 3. c. 12 Pr.	3 March 1777
An Act for dividing and enclosing the Open Fields and Meadows, within the Parish of Shepshead, in the County of Leicester, and the Common Ground lying within the Ring Fence of the same Fields, and adjoining thereto, within the same Parish; and also several Closes or Parcels of Land and Ground, called The Carrs and Michaelmas Grounds, within the said Parish.
Holcot Inclosure Act 1777	17 Geo. 3. c. 13 Pr.	3 March 1777
An Act for dividing, allotting, and enclosing, the Open and Common Fields, Common Pastures, Common Meadows, and other Commonable Lands and Grounds, of and within the Manor and Parish of Holcot, in the County of Northampton.
King's Meaburn Inclosure Act 1777	17 Geo. 3. c. 14 Pr.	3 March 1777
An Act for dividing and enclosing the Common and Waste Grounds, within the Manor or Lordship of King's Meaburn, in the Parish of Moreland, in the County of Westmorland.
Horncliff and Horncliff Lone End (Durham) Inclosures Act 1777	17 Geo. 3. c. 15 Pr.	3 March 1777
An Act for dividing and enclosing a certain Piece of Common or Waste Ground, lying in the Villages of Horncliff and Horncliff Lone-End, in the Parish of Norham, in the County of Durham.
Thorner Inclosure Act 1777	17 Geo. 3. c. 16 Pr.	3 March 1777
An Act for dividing and enclosing several Commons or Waste Grounds, Open Common Fields, Undivided Enclosures, and other Commonable Lands, within the Manor and Parish of Thorner, in the West Riding of the County of York.
Rednal Inclosure Act 1777	17 Geo. 3. c. 17 Pr.	3 March 1777
An Act for dividing and enclosing the Moors, Commons or Waste Grounds, within the Township of Rednal, in the Parish of West Felton, in the County of Salop.
Tempsford Inclosure Act 1777	17 Geo. 3. c. 18 Pr.	3 March 1777
An Act for dividing, allotting, and enclosing, the Open and Common Fields, Meadows, Commonable Lands, and Commons, within the Parish of Tempsford, in the County of Bedford.
Eames' Name Act 1777	17 Geo. 3. c. 19 Pr.	3 March 1777
An Act to enable John Eames a Minor, and his Issue, to take and use the Surname of Waight, pursuant to the Will of John Waight Esquire, deceased.
Naturalization of George Soltau, Gerhard Berck, Henry Hammelburg and Gunter Kroger Act 1777	17 Geo. 3. c. 20 Pr.	3 March 1777
An Act for naturalizing George William Soltau, Gerhard Berck, Henry Albrecht Hammelburg, and Gunter Henry Kroger.
Naturalization of Ernest Bernard Banning Act 1777	17 Geo. 3. c. 21 Pr.	3 March 1777
An Act for naturalizing Ernest Bernard Banning.
Naturalization of John Centlives Act 1777	17 Geo. 3. c. 22 Pr.	3 March 1777
An Act for naturalizing John Centlivres.
Naturalization of Marcellin Pernoud Act 1777	17 Geo. 3. c. 23 Pr.	3 March 1777
An Act for naturalizing Marcellin Pernoud.
Naturalization of William Aguiton Act 1777	17 Geo. 3. c. 24 Pr.	3 March 1777
An Act for naturalizing William Aguiton.
Naturalization of Willem Vlught Act 1777	17 Geo. 3. c. 25 Pr.	3 March 1777
An Act for naturalizing Willem Vlught.
Naturalization of Horace Cattaneo and Francis Gaudot Act 1777	17 Geo. 3. c. 26 Pr.	3 March 1777
An Act for naturalizing Horace Cattaneo and Francis Gaudot.
Ladbroke's Estate Act 1777	17 Geo. 3. c. 27 Pr.	27 March 1777
An Act for vesting certain Estates of Robert Ladbroke Esquire, in the City of London, and Counties of Middlesex, Northampton, Berks, and Warwick, in Trustees to be sold, and for laying out the Monies to arise thereby in the Purchase of other Manors, Lands, and Hereditaments, to be settled to the same Uses as the said Settled Estates now stand limited.
Discharging certain copyhold premises in Heston (Middlesex) from uses and trusts in Mary Wooton's will and subjecting said premises and other contiguous lands there to payment of a perpetual yearly rent charge of £12 to the parish rector John Gibson and his successors for use of the parish poor and settling and assuring said premises in the trustees of Rupert Clarke.	17 Geo. 3. c. 28 Pr.	27 March 1777
An Act to discharge certain Copyhold Premises, in the Parish of Heston, in the County of Middlesex, from the Uses and Trusts thereof, declared by the Will of Mary Wotton deceased; and to subject and charge the same Copyhold Premises, and also certain Freehold Lands lying contiguous thereto, within the said Parish, with the Payment of a perpetual yearly Rent Charge of Twelve Pounds, to the Reverend John Gibson Clerk, and his Successors, Vicars of the said Parish, for the Use of the Poor of the same Parish; and for settling and assuring the same Premises so charged in the Trustees of Rupert Clarke Esquire, upon the Trusts therein mentioned.
Grimston's Estates Act 1777	17 Geo. 3. c. 29 Pr.	27 March 1777
An Act for vesting Part of the Settled Estates of Robert Grimston Esquire, at Thwing and Octon, in the Parish of Thwing upon the Woulds, in the East Riding of the County of York, in the said Robert Grimston, in Fee-Simple; and for settling an Estate of the said Robert Grimston, in the Township of Neswick, in the Parish of Bainton, in the said East Riding of the County of York, of greater Value, in lieu thereof; and for other Purposes.
Tunstall in Holderness Inclosure Act 1777	17 Geo. 3. c. 30 Pr.	27 March 1777
An Act for dividing and enclosing the Open Fields, Meadows, Pastures, and other un-enclosed Grounds, within the Township of Tunstall, in Holderness, in the East Riding of the County of York.
Syston and Barkby (Leicestershire) Inclosures Act 1777	17 Geo. 3. c. 31 Pr.	27 March 1777
An Act for dividing, allotting, and enclosing the Open and Common Fields, Meadows, and Pastures, in the Parish of Syston, in the County of Leicester, and several Parcels of un-enclosed Land in the Parish of Barkby, in the said County of Leicester, lying within the Ring of the said Fields.
Boynton Inclosure Act 1777	17 Geo. 3. c. 32 Pr.	27 March 1777
An Act for dividing and allotting the several Open and Common Fields, Pastures, and other unenclosed Grounds, within the Township of Boynton, in the East Riding of the County of York.
Langley in Warden (Northumberland) Inclosure Act 1777	17 Geo. 3. c. 33 Pr.	27 March 1777
An Act for dividing and enclosing a Common Moor or Tract of Waste Ground called Lees Fell otherwise Morralee, and Struther's Common and Hagbank, within the Barony or Manor of Langley, and in the Parish of Warden, in the County of Northumberland.
Compton Bishop Inclosure Act 1777	17 Geo. 3. c. 34 Pr.	27 March 1777
An Act for dividing and enclosing the Commonable Lands and Waste Grounds, within the Manor and Parish of Compton Bishop, commonly called or known by the Name of Cross Moor alias Charles Moor, in the County of Somerset.
Swinstead Inclosure Act 1777	17 Geo. 3. c. 35 Pr.	27 March 1777
An Act for dividing and enclosing the Open and Common Fields, Meadows, Common Pastures, and other Commonable Lands and Grounds, in the Parish of Swinstead and County of Lincoln.
Duntisbourne Abbotts Inclosure Act 1777	17 Geo. 3. c. 36 Pr.	27 March 1777
An Act for dividing and enclosing the Open Common Fields, Common Pastures, Waste Grounds, and Commonable Places, in the Parish of Duntisborne Abbotts, in the County of Gloucester.
Kirnington or Kirmington (Lincolnshire) Inclosure Act 1777	17 Geo. 3. c. 37 Pr.	27 March 1777
An Act for dividing and enclosing certain Open Fields, Lands, and Grounds, within the Parish of Kirnington otherwise Kirmington, in the County of Lincoln.
Shirland Inclosure Act 1777	17 Geo. 3. c. 38 Pr.	27 March 1777
An Act for dividing and enclosing the several Commons and Waste Grounds, within the Manor of Shirland, in the County of Derby.
Stretton in Northwingfield and Morton (Derbyshire) Inclosure Act 1777	17 Geo. 3. c. 39 Pr.	27 March 1777
An Act for dividing and enclosing the several Commons and Waste Grounds, within the Manor of Stretton, in the Parishes of Northwing field and Morton, in the County of Derby.
Winthorpe Inclosure Act 1777	17 Geo. 3. c. 40 Pr.	27 March 1777
An Act for dividing and enclosing, the Open Fields, Meadows, and Grounds, in the Parish of Winthorpe, in the County of Nottingham.
Huntspill and Cossington Inclosure Act 1777	17 Geo. 3. c. 41 Pr.	27 March 1777
An Act for dividing, allotting, and enclosing certain Commons or Waste Lands, lying in the Parish of Huntspill in the County of Somerset; and also certain Moors, called Land Moor otherwise Cote Moor, and Gold Corner, lying in or near the said Parish of Huntspill and Cossington, in the said County.
Wallingfen Inclosure Act 1777	17 Geo. 3. c. 42 Pr.	27 March 1777
An Act for dividing, enclosing, and improving Walling fen, in the East Riding of the County of York.
Ludgershall Inclosure Act 1777	17 Geo. 3. c. 43 Pr.	27 March 1777
An Act for dividing, enclosing, assigning, and allotting, the Open and Common Field and Commonable Land, lying within the Liberties, Territories, and Precincts of Ludgershall, in the County of Buckingham.
Bugthorpe Inclosure Act 1777	17 Geo. 3. c. 44 Pr.	27 March 1777
An Act for dividing and enclosing several Open Fields and Stinted Pastures, within the Township of Bugthorpe, in the County of York; and for exempting the Lands, Tenements, and Frontsteads, within the Parish of Bugthorpe, from the Payment of Tythes and other Ecclesiastical Dues; and for other Purposes therein contained.
Fremington Inclosure Act 1777	17 Geo. 3. c. 45 Pr.	27 March 1777
An Act for dividing and enclosing Fremington Edge and Fremington Moor, and certain Waste Grounds, in the Township of Fremington, in the Parish of Grinton, in the North Riding of the County of York.
Aysgarth Inclosure Act 1777	17 Geo. 3. c. 46 Pr.	27 March 1777
An Act for dividing and enclosing Aysgarth Pasture and Aysgarth Moor or Common, in the Township and Parish of Aysgarth, in the North Riding of the County of York.
Harris's Divorce Act 1777	17 Geo. 3. c. 47 Pr.	27 March 1777
An Act to dissolve the Marriage of John Potter Harris Esquire, with Elizabeth Martha Chicheley Plowden his now Wife, and to enable him to marry again; and for other Purposes therein mentioned.
Clarke's Name Act 1777	17 Geo. 3. c. 48 Pr.	27 March 1777
An Act to enable Jervoise Clarke Esquire, and the Heirs Male of his Body, to take and use the Surname and Arms of Jervoise, pursuant to the Will of Thomas Jervoise Esquire deceased.
Enabling the Archbishop of Canterbury and Daniel Ponton to grant building leases pursuant to an agreement made for that purpose.	17 Geo. 3. c. 49 Pr.	30 April 1777
An Act to enable the Archbishop of Canterbury and Daniel Ponton Esquire, to grant Building Leases, pursuant to an Agreement entered into for that Purpose.
Spencer's Estate Act 1777	17 Geo. 3. c. 50 Pr.	30 April 1777
An Act for vesting in the Right Honourable Robert Spencer, commonly called Lord Robert Spencer, and the Most Noble George Duke of Marlborough, One of the Knights Companions of the Most Noble Order of the Garter, and the Heirs and Assigns of the said Duke of Marlborough, the Settled Estates of the said Lord Robert Spencer, situate in the County of Lincoln.
Broughton's Estate Act 1777	17 Geo. 3. c. 51 Pr.	30 April 1777
An Act for Sale of Part of the Settled Estate of Sir Thomas Broughton Baronet, situate in the County of Stafford, and purchasing other Estates situate in the County of Chester, to be settled to the same Uses; and for extinguishing the said Sir Thomas Broughton's Power of making Leases for Lives, as to Part of his Settled Estate in the County of Chester, and making such Recompence to him for the same as therein is mentioned.
Enabling John Barnewell Curson to settle a jointure on any future wife.	17 Geo. 3. c. 52 Pr.	30 April 1777
An Act to enable John Barnewall Curson Esquire, to settle a Jointure upon any Woman or Women he may hereafter marry.
Enabling Thomas and William Henry Assheton Smith to grant building, improving and other leases on estates devised by William Smith's will.	17 Geo. 3. c. 53 Pr.	30 April 1777
An Act to enable Thomas Assheton Smith Esquire, and William Henry Assheton Smith his Brother, to grant building, improving, and other Leases, of the Estates devised by the Will of William Smith Esquire, deceased.
Osman's Estate Act 1777	17 Geo. 3. c. 54 Pr.	30 April 1777
An Act for vesting the undivided Moiety of the Reverend Henry Osman Clerk, and Mary his Wife, of and in certain Lands and Hereditaments, in the Parish of King's Langley, in the County of Hertford, in Trustees, to be sold, and for applying Part of the Money arising by such Sale in Discharge of an Incumbrance upon the said Moiety; and for laying out the Residue thereof, in the Purchase of entire Messuages, Lands or Hereditaments, to be settled in lieu thereof, to the same Uses.
Establishing and confirming an exchange of lands in Wighthill in Tackley (Oxfordshire) pursuant to an agreement between Corpus Christi College, Oxford and Simon Wisdome.	17 Geo. 3. c. 55 Pr.	30 April 1777
An Act for establishing and confirming Exchanges of divers Messuages, Lands, Tenements, and Hereditaments, situate, standing, lying, and being, within the Hamlet of Wighthill, in the Parish of Tackley, in the County of Oxford, pursuant to Articles of Agreement between the President and Scholars of Corpus Christi College, in the University of Oxford, and Simon Wisdome Esquire; and for other Purposes therein mentioned.
Magdalen College Oxford Estate Act 1777	17 Geo. 3. c. 56 Pr.	30 April 1777
An Act to enable the President and Scholars of the College of Saint Mary Magdalen, in the University of Oxford, to grant Building Leases of certain Ground, Messuages, Houses, and Buildings, in the Parish of Saint John Southwark, in the County of Surrey.
Rugby School and Alms-houses Act 1777	17 Geo. 3. c. 57 Pr. (Note: Also cited as 17 Geo. 3. c. 71.)	30 April 1777
An Act to enable the Feoffees and Trustees of an Estate in the County of Middlesex, given by Lawrence Sheriff for the founding and maintaining a School (Note: Rugby School.) and Almshouses at Rugby, in the County of Warwick, to sell Part of the said Estate, or to grant Leases thereof, or of any Part thereof; and to effectuate the other Purposes therein mentioned.
Bolton Inclosure Act 1777	17 Geo. 3. c. 58 Pr.	30 April 1777
An Act for dividing and enclosing the Commons and Waste Grounds, within the Manor of Bolton, in the County of Cumberland.
Egremont Inclosure Act 1777	17 Geo. 3. c. 59 Pr.	30 April 1777
An Act for dividing and enclosing certain Commons and Wastes, within the Manor of Egremont, in the County of Cumberland.
St. Cuthbert Carlisle and St. Mary Carlisle (Cumberland) Inclosure Act 1777	17 Geo. 3. c. 60 Pr.	30 April 1777
An Act for dividing and enclosing the Common and Waste Grounds, within the Townships, Villages, or Hamlets of Carleton, Brisco, and Wreay, within the Manor or Lordship of Botchardgate, otherwise Prior Lordship, in the Parishes of Saint Cuthbert Carlisle and Saint Mary Carlisle, in the County of Cumberland.
Nassington Inclosure Act 1777	17 Geo. 3. c. 61 Pr.	30 April 1777
An Act for dividing and enclosing the Common and Open Fields, Meadows, Commonable Lands, and Waste Grounds, in Nassington, Yarwell, Apethorpe, and Wood-Newton, within the Prebend or Peculiar of Nassington, in the County of Northampton.
Little Cressingham Inclosure Act 1777	17 Geo. 3. c. 62 Pr.	30 April 1777
An Act for dividing, allotting, and enclosing, the Open and Common Fields, Heaths, Half-year Lands, and other Commonable Meadows, Pastures, and Grounds, within the Parish of Little Cressingham, in the County of Norfolk.
Whittington Inclosure Act 1777	17 Geo. 3. c. 63 Pr.	30 April 1777
An Act for dividing and enclosing the Commons or Waste Lands, within the Manor of Whittington, in the County of Salop.
Farlam Inclosure Act 1777	17 Geo. 3. c. 64 Pr.	30 April 1777
An Act for dividing, allotting, and enclosing, the several Moors, Commons, and Waste Grounds, lying within the Manor and Parish of Farlam, in the County of Cumberland.
Brampton Inclosure Act 1777	17 Geo. 3. c. 65 Pr.	30 April 1777
An Act for dividing, allotting, and enclosing, the several Moors, Commons, and Waste Grounds, lying within the Manor and Parish of Brampton, in the County of Cumberland.
Tibshelf Inclosure Act 1777	17 Geo. 3. c. 66 Pr.	30 April 1777
An Act for dividing, enclosing, and improving, certain Commons, Lands, and Grounds, in the Township of Tibshelf, in the County of Derby.
Weston under Wetheley Inclosure Act 1777	17 Geo. 3. c. 67 Pr.	30 April 1777
An Act for dividing and enclosing the Open and Common Fields, and other Commonable Lands, in the Parish of Weston under Wetheley, in the County of Warwick.
Condicote Inclosure Act 1777	17 Geo. 3. c. 68 Pr.	30 April 1777
An Act for dividing and enclosing the Open and Common Fields, and other Commonable Lands, in the Parish of Condicote, in the County of Gloucester.
Wreningham Inclosure Act 1777	17 Geo. 3. c. 69 Pr.	30 April 1777
An Act for dividing, allotting, and enclosing, the Commons and Waste Lands, within the Parish of Wreningham, in the County of Norfolk.
Carlton Rode Inclosure Act 1777	17 Geo. 3. c. 70 Pr.	30 April 1777
An Act for dividing, allotting, and enclosing, the Old Whole Year Enclosures, Common Fields, Commons, and Waste Lands, within the Parish of Carlton Rode, in the County of Norfolk.
Prudhoe in Ovingham (Northumberland) Inclosure Act 1777	17 Geo. 3. c. 71 Pr.	30 April 1777
An Act for dividing and enclosing certain Tracts of Waste Grounds, Moors or Commons, within the Manor and Barony of Prudhoe and Parish of Ovingham, in the County of Northumberland.
Welford Inclosure Act 1777	17 Geo. 3. c. 72 Pr.	30 April 1777
An Act for dividing and enclosing the Open Fields and Commonable Places, of and within the Parish of Welford, in the County of Northampton.
Stanton St. John Inclosure Act 1777	17 Geo. 3. c. 73 Pr.	30 April 1777
An Act for dividing and enclosing the Open Common Fields, Meadows, Pastures, Commons, and Commonable Lands, within the Manor and Parish of Stanton Saint John, in the County of Oxford.
Great and Little Bourton Inclosure Act 1777	17 Geo. 3. c. 74 Pr.	30 April 1777
An Act for dividing and enclosing the Open and Common Field, and Commonable Lands, lying within the Townships and Liberties of Great Bourton and Little Bourton, in the Parish of Cropredy, in the County of Oxford.
Felthorpe Inclosure Act 1777	17 Geo. 3. c. 75 Pr.	30 April 1777
An Act for dividing, allotting, and enclosing, the Dole or Heath Lands, Commons, and Waste Grounds, within the Parish of Felthorpe, in the County of Norfolk.
Market Lavington Inclosure Act 1777	17 Geo. 3. c. 76 Pr.	30 April 1777
An Act for dividing, allotting, and laying in Severalty, the Open Common Fields, Common Meadows, Common Downs, Waste Lands, and Commonable Places, within the Parish of Market Lavington, in the County of Wilts.
Howtell Common or Housedon in Kirknewton (Northumberland) Inclosure Act 1777	17 Geo. 3. c. 77 Pr.	30 April 1777
An Act for dividing and enclosing a Common or Moor, called Howtell Common, alias Housedon, in the Parish of Kirknewton, in the County of Northumberland.
Confirming exchanges of lands and tithes and open and uninclosed common fields in Wendover (Buckinghamshire) and establishing annual payments in lieu of tithes.	17 Geo. 3. c. 78 Pr.	30 April 1777
An Act for confirming Exchanges of Lands and Tythes, of and in the Open and un-enclosed Common Fields, within the Manor and Parish of Wendover, in the County of Buckingham; and for establishing and securing certain annual Payments in lieu of Tythes.
Yealands in Warton (Lancashire) Inclosure Act 1777	17 Geo. 3. c. 79 Pr.	30 April 1777
An Act for dividing and enclosing the Common and Waste Grounds, and certain Common Fields, and also Two Mosses, called Waitbam Moss and Hilderstone Moss, within the Manor of Yealands, in the Parish of Warton, and County Palatine of Lancaster.
Wykeham and Caudwell (Leicestershire) Inclosure Act 1777	17 Geo. 3. c. 80 Pr.	30 April 1777
An Act for dividing and enclosing the Open and Common Fields, Common Meadows, Common Pastures, and other Commonable Lands, lying and being in Wykeham and Caudwell, in the Parish of Rothley, in the County of Leicester.
Kirkby Ravensworth, Ravansworth, and Whashton (Yorkshire, North Riding) Inclosures Act 1777	17 Geo. 3. c. 81 Pr.	30 April 1777
An Act for dividing and enclosing Three several Moors or Commons, called Low Gatherley Moor, Moor Holme, and The High Moor, situate in the several Townships of Kirkby Ravensworth, Ravensworth, and Whashton, in the Parish of Kirkby Ravensworth, in the North Riding of the County of York.
Braithwaite's Divorce Act 1777	17 Geo. 3. c. 82 Pr.	30 April 1777
An Act to dissolve the Marriage of John Braithwaite Esquire with Elizabeth Browne his now Wife, and to enable him to marry again; and for other Purposes therein mentioned.
Kilborn's Name Act 1777	17 Geo. 3. c. 83 Pr.	30 April 1777
An Act to enable William Kilborn, and his Issue Male, to take and use the Surname of Burrowes, pursuant to the Will of John Burrowes deceased.
Philips' Estate Act 1777	17 Geo. 3. c. 84 Pr.	7 May 1777
An Act for vesting the Real Estates, late of Ann Phillips Spinster, now the Wife of Henry Barnes Gentleman, comprized in their Marriage Settlement, situate in the County of Salop, in Trustees, to be sold; and for applying the Purchase Money for the Purposes in the Act mentioned.
Philip Jones and Robert Berkley's Estates	17 Geo. 3. c. 85 Pr.	7 May 1777
An Act for vesting in Trustees and their Heirs, certain Estates of Philip Jones and Robert Berkeley Esquires, in the Counties of Kent and Sussex, in order to sell the same, and with Part of the Purchase Money to discharge certain Incumbrances thereon; and for laying out the Residue of the Purchase Money, in the Purchase of other Estates, to be settled to the same Uses as the said Estates to be sold, stand limited.
Thomas Hull's Estate Act 1777	17 Geo. 3. c. 86 Pr.	7 May 1777
An Act for discharging Part of the Settled Estates of Thomas Hull Esquire, in the Counties of Dorset and Devon, from the Uses and Trusts of his Marriage Settlement, and for settling other Estates in the County of Devon in lieu thereof; and for other Purposes.
United Charities of Nathaniel Waterhouse (Halifax) Act 1777	17 Geo. 3. c. 87 Pr.	7 May 1777
An Act for uniting and better regulating the Charities of Nathaniel Waterhouse, within the Town and Parish of Halifax, in the West Riding of the County of York.
Wheatley's Estate Act 1777	17 Geo. 3. c. 88 Pr.	7 May 1777
An Act for vesting certain Pieces or Parcels of Ground and Hereditaments, in the County of Kent, Part of the Settled Estate of William Wheatley Esquire, in Trustees, to be sold to Sir Sampson Gideon Baronet, pursuant to Agreement; and for laying out the Money arising by Sale thereof, in the Purchase of other Lands or Hereditaments, to be settled to the same Uses.
Swinburne's Estate Act 1777	17 Geo. 3. c. 89 Pr.	7 May 1777
An Act for vesting certain Messuages and Hereditaments, in the several Parishes of Kirkwhelpington, Lowick, and Simonburne, in the County of Northumberland, late Part of the Estate of Sir John Swinburne Baronet, deceased, in Trustees and their Heirs, in Trust, to be sold, discharged from the Uses, Trusts, Charges, and Powers, in the Will of the said Sir John Swinburne mentioned; and for applying the Money to arise by Sale thereof in Manner therein mentioned, and for other Purposes therein expressed.
Jackson's Estate Act 1777	17 Geo. 3. c. 90 Pr.	7 May 1777
An Act to enable William Jackson and Hannah his Wife, to carry into Execution an Agreement for Sale of certain Hereditaments situate at or near Barney, in the County of Norfolk, (being their Settled Estate) to Richard Reeve the younger, Gentleman; and for laying out the Money arising by such Sale, in the Purchase of other Lands and Hereditaments, to be settled to the Uses to which the said Settled Estate doth now stand limited.
Trattle's Estate Act 1777	17 Geo. 3. c. 91 Pr.	7 May 1777
An Act for vesting certain Messuages, Lands, Tenements, and Hereditaments, in the Isle of Wight, the Settled Estate of Elizabeth Trattle of Cardiff, in the County of Glamorgan, Widow; and also a certain Messuage, and Lands and Hereditaments, of the Warden and Scholars, Clerks, of Saint Mary College of Winchester, near Winchester, in the County of Southampton, in Trustees, in Trust, to sell and convey Part of the said Settled Estate, and also the said Estate of the said Warden and Scholars, Clerks, to Sir Richard Worsley Baronet, and other Part of the said Settled Estates to the said Warden and Scholars, Clerks; and to apply Part of the Money arising from such Sale, in paying off an Incumbrance affecting Part of the said Settled Estate, and for laying out the Residue of the said Money, in the Purchase of other Lands and Hereditaments, to be settled to the like Uses; and to enable the said Warden and Scholars, Clerks, to take a Conveyance of that Part of the said Settled Estates, intended to be conveyed to them.
Weddell's Estate Act 1777	17 Geo. 3. c. 92 Pr.	7 May 1777
An Act for vesting Part of the Settled Estates of William Weddell Esquire, in Trustees, to be sold, and for laying out the Money arising by such Sale in the Purchase of Lands and Hereditaments, to be settled in lieu thereof; and for the other Purposes therein mentioned.
Harvey's Estate Act 1777	17 Geo. 3. c. 93 Pr.	7 May 1777
An Act for vesting the Real and Personal Estate of John Harvey Gentleman, a Lunatick, in Trustees, in Trust, to sell so much thereof as will be sufficient for the Payment of the Debts and Legacies of John Harvey, his late Father, deceased; and for other Purposes therein mentioned.
Baldwyn's Estate Act 1777	17 Geo. 3. c. 94 Pr.	7 May 1777
An Act for repealing an Act, made in the Twelfth Year of the Reign of His present Majesty, intituled, "An Act for vesting the Manors, Lands, and Tenements, both Freehold and Leasehold, comprized in the Marriage Settlement of Charles Baldwyn Esquire, in Trustees, to be sold; and for laying out the Money arising by such Sale, in the Purchase of other Lands and Hereditaments, to be settled to the same Uses which are now subsisting with regard to the said Freehold Settled Estate;" (Note: Baldwyn's Estate Act 1772 (12 Geo. 3. c. 92 Pr.)) and for settling the said Manors, Lands, and Tenements, to new and other Uses.
Rendering valid and effectual a partition of estates in Huntingdon, Leicestershire, Cambridge, Essex and Kent made between Taylor and Sarah White and Thomas and Ann Fowke and for vesting and settling the same to uses and trusts in their marriage settlements.	17 Geo. 3. c. 95 Pr.	7 May 1777
An Act for rendering valid and effectual a Partition between Taylor White Esquire and Sarah his Wife, and Thomas Fowke Esquire and Ann his Wife, of several Estates in the Counties of Huntingdon, Leicester, Cambridge, Essex, and Kent, and for vesting and settling the same to the Uses and upon the Trusts contained in their respective Marriage Settlements; and for other Purposes therein mentioned.
Confirming and establishing an exchange made between George Lord Onslow and Cranley and William and Edmund Luck.	17 Geo. 3. c. 96 Pr.	7 May 1777
An Act for confirming and establishing an Exchange agreed to be made between the Right Honourable George Lord Onslow and Cranley, and William Luck Gentleman, and Edmund Luck his Son.
Combe's Estates Act 1777	17 Geo. 3. c. 97 Pr.	7 May 1777
An Act for vesting the Freehold Estates, in the Counties of Hereford and Monmouth; devised by the Will of Thomas Chamberlayne Esquire, deceased, in Richard Combe Esquire, in Fee-Simple; and for settling other Estates of the said Richard Combe, in the County of Somerset, of greater Value, in lieu thereof.
Halton Moor in Whitkirke (Yorkshire, West Riding) Inclosure Act 1777	17 Geo. 3. c. 98 Pr.	7 May 1777
An Act for dividing, allotting, and enclosing, a certain Common or Waste Ground, called Halton Moor, in the Township of Halton, in the Manor of Templenewsam, in the Parish of Whitkirke, in the West Riding of the County of York.
Great Sturton Inclosure Act 1777	17 Geo. 3. c. 99 Pr.	7 May 1777
An Act for dividing and enclosing the Open and Common Fields, Common Meadows, Common Pastures, and Waste Lands, within the Manor and Parish of Great Sturton, in the County of Lincoln.
Kingsley, Newton near Kingsley Norley, and Crowton (Cheshire) Inclosures Act 1777	17 Geo. 3. c. 100 Pr.	7 May 1777
An Act for dividing, allotting, and enclosing, certain Commons or Waste Grounds, within the several Townships of Kingsley Newton near Kingsley, Norley, and Crowton, in the Parishes of Frodsham and Weaverham, in the County of Chester.
Hamilton's Estate Act 1777	17 Geo. 3. c. 101 Pr.	16 May 1777
An Act for vesting Part of the Settled Estates of Sir William Hamilton, and Dame Catherine his Wife, in Trustees, to sell or exchange the same; and for laying out the Money to arise by Sale thereof, in the Purchase of other Messuages, Lands or Hereditaments, to be settled to the same Uses.
Egerton's Estate Act 1777	17 Geo. 3. c. 102 Pr.	16 May 1777
An Act for Sale of the Settled Estate of Philip Egerton Esquire, in the County of Flint; and for investing the Money in the Purchase of other Estates, to be settled to the same Uses.
Clarke's Estates Act 1777	17 Geo. 3. c. 103 Pr.	16 May 1777
An Act to confirm and establish Articles of Agreement, for a Partition or Division of Lands and Hereditaments, in the Counties of Northampton and Warwick, the Estates of John Clarke Esquire, and Mary his late Wife, deceased; and for settling the same to the Uses therein mentioned.
Killamarsh Inclosure Act 1777	17 Geo. 3. c. 104 Pr.	16 May 1777
An Act for dividing and enclosing the several Open Fields, Arable Lands, Meadows, Commons, and Waste Grounds, within the Manor of Killamarsh, in the County of Derby.
Whilton, Norton and Brockhall (Northamptonshire) Inclosures Act 1777	17 Geo. 3. c. 105 Pr.	16 May 1777
An Act for dividing, allotting, and enclosing the Open and Common Fields, and other Commonable Lands and Grounds, of and within the several Parishes and Liberties of Whilton, Norton, and Brockhall, or in some or One of them, in the County of Northampton.
Shirebourne and Windrush (Gloucestershire) Inclosure Act 1777	17 Geo. 3. c. 106 Pr.	16 May 1777
An Act for dividing and enclosing the Common Fields, Common Meadows, Pastures, and Common Downs, in the Parishes of Shireborne and Windrush, in the County of Gloucester.
Grafton Underwood Inclosure Act 1777	17 Geo. 3. c. 107 Pr.	16 May 1777
An Act for dividing and enclosing the Common and Open Fields, Common Meadows, and Common Pastures, in the Manor and Parish of Grafton Underwood, in the County of Northampton.
Metheringham Inclosure Act 1777	17 Geo. 3. c. 108 Pr.	16 May 1777
An Act for dividing and enclosing the Open and Common Fields, Meadows, Pastures, Fens, Heath, and Waste Lands, within the Manor and Parish of Metheringham, in the County of Lincoln.
Candlesby Inclosure Act 1777	17 Geo. 3. c. 109 Pr.	16 May 1777
An Act for dividing and enclosing certain Open Common Fields, Meadows, and other Commonable Lands and Grounds, within the Parish of Candlesby, in the County of Lincoln.
Newsham Inclosure Act 1777	17 Geo. 3. c. 110 Pr.	16 May 1777
An Act for dividing and enclosing the Commons and Waste Lands, and a Stinted Pasture, in the Township of Newsham, in the North Riding of the County of York.
Barmby upon the Moor Inclosure Act 1777	17 Geo. 3. c. 111 Pr.	16 May 1777
An Act for dividing and enclosing several Open Common Fields, Common Pastures, Ings, Common, and other Waste Lands and Grounds, within the Township and Manor of Barmby upon the Moor, in the East Riding of the County of York.
North and South Newbald (Yorkshire) Inclosures Act 1777	17 Geo. 3. c. 112 Pr.	16 May 1777
An Act for dividing and enclosing several Open Common Arable Fields, Wolds, Commons, and Waste Grounds, in the Townships of North Newbald and South Newbald, within the Parish of North Newbald, in the County of York.
Killesby Inclosure Act 1777	17 Geo. 3. c. 113 Pr.	16 May 1777
An Act for dividing and enclosing the Open and Common Fields, Common Pastures, Common Meadows, and other Commonable Lands and Grounds, of and within the Manor, Parish, and Liberties of Killesby, in the County of Northampton.
Thornton Inclosure Act 1777	17 Geo. 3. c. 114 Pr.	16 May 1777
An Act for dividing and enclosing the several Open Arable Fields, Meadow and Pasture Grounds, and the Common or Moor, within the Township of Thornton, in the Parish of Foston, in the North Riding of the County of York.
Farnsfield Inclosure Act 1777	17 Geo. 3. c. 115 Pr.	16 May 1777
An Act for dividing and enclosing the Open Fields, Meadows, Common Pastures, Forest, and Waste Grounds, in the Parish of Farnsfield, in the County of Nottingham.
Brampton Inclosure Act 1777	17 Geo. 3. c. 116 Pr.	16 May 1777
An Act for dividing and enclosing certain Open Fields, Meadows, Commons, and Waste Grounds, in the Parish of Brampton, in the County of Lincoln.
Halam and Edingley Inclosure Act 1777	17 Geo. 3. c. 117 Pr.	16 May 1777
An Act for dividing and enclosing the Open Fields, Meadows, Commons, and Waste Grounds, within the Parishes of Halam and Edingley, in the County of Nottingham.
Leadenham Inclosure Act 1777	17 Geo. 3. c. 118 Pr.	16 May 1777
An Act for dividing and enclosing the Open and Common Fields, Commonable Lands, and Waste Grounds, within the Manor and Parish of Leadenham, in the County of Lincoln.
Uffington, Balking, Woolston, Kinston Lisle and Fawler (Berkshire) Inclosures Act 1777	17 Geo. 3. c. 119 Pr.	16 May 1777
An Act for dividing, allotting, and enclosing, certain Open and Common Fields, Common Meadows, Common Pastures, Downs, Commons, and other Commonable Lands, within the Township of Ussington, and the Hamlets of Balking and Woolston, otherwise Woolverston, and within the Hamlets of Kingston, Lisle, and Fawler, in the County of Berks.
Monkbretton or Burton (Yorkshire, West Riding) Inclosure Act 1777	17 Geo. 3. c. 120 Pr.	16 May 1777
An Act for dividing and enclosing the Common Fields, Mesne Enclosures, Commons or Waste Grounds, within the Township of Monkbretton, otherwise Burton, in the Parish of Roystone, in the West Riding of the County of York.
Farmborough or Farnborough (Berkshire) Inclosure Act 1777	17 Geo. 3. c. 121 Pr.	16 May 1777
An Act for dividing and enclosing the Open and Common Fields, and certain Commonable Lands, within the Parish of Farmborough, otherwise Farnborough, in the County of Berks.
Gilmorton Inclosure Act 1777	17 Geo. 3. c. 122 Pr.	16 May 1777
An Act for dividing and enclosing the Open and Common Fields, and Commonable Grounds, within the Parish of Gilmorton, in the County of Leicester.
Weston Colville Inclosure Act 1777	17 Geo. 3. c. 123 Pr.	16 May 1777
An Act for dividing, allotting, and enclosing, the Open and Common Fields, Commonable Lands, Cow Pasture or Shrub, Town Green, Heath, and Waste Grounds, within the Manor and Parish of Weston Colville, in the County of Cambridge.
Baschurch, Hordley, Stanwardine in the Wood, Weston, Lulingfield and Stanwardine in the Fields (Salop.) inclosures.	17 Geo. 3. c. 124 Pr.	16 May 1777
An Act for dividing and enclosing the Moors, Commons or Waste Grounds, within the Manors of Baschurch, Hordley, Stanwardine in the Wood, Weston, Lulling field, and Stanwardine in the Fields, or some of them, in the County of Salop.
Ramsbury Inclosure Act 1777	17 Geo. 3. c. 125 Pr.	16 May 1777
An Act for dividing and allotting the Open and Common Fields, Common Meadows, Common Pastures, and other Commonable Grounds, in the Tythings or Liberties of Ramsbury Town, Park Town, Whittonditch, Eastridge, and Baydon, within the Manor of Ramsbury, in the County of Wilts.
Bulmer Inclosure Act 1777	17 Geo. 3. c. 126 Pr.	16 May 1777
An Act for dividing, allotting, and enclosing, the Open Fields, Common Pastures, and Moor or Common, in the Parish of Bulmer, in the North Riding of the County of York.
Corfton or Corveton Wood and Diddlebury (Salop.) Inclosures Act 1777	17 Geo. 3. c. 127 Pr.	16 May 1777
An Act for dividing and enclosing Corfton Wood, otherwise Corveton Wood or Common, within the Manor of Corston, otherwise Corveton, and Parish of Diddlebury, in the County of Salop; and for making a Boundary or Ring Fence against a certain Open and un-enclosed Ground, in the Manor of Corpham, within the same Parish.
Mears Ashby Inclosure Act 1777	17 Geo. 3. c. 128 Pr.	16 May 1777
An Act for dividing, allotting, and enclosing, the Open and Common Fields, Common Pastures, Common Meadows, and other Commonable Lands and Grounds, of and within the Manor and Parish of Mears Ashby, in the County of Northampton.
Bleasby Inclosure Act 1777	17 Geo. 3. c. 129 Pr.	16 May 1777
An Act for dividing and enclosing the Open Fields, Meadows, Pastures, Commons, and Waste Grounds, within the Parish of Bleasby, in the County of Nottingham.
Ipstones Inclosure Act 1777	17 Geo. 3. c. 130 Pr.	16 May 1777
An Act for dividing and enclosing the several Commons and Waste Grounds, within the Manor and Parish of Ipstones, in the County of Stafford.
Earl of Tyrconnel's Divorce Act 1777	17 Geo. 3. c. 131 Pr.	16 May 1777
An Act to dissolve the Marriage of George Carpenter Esquire, Earl of Tyrconnel, in the Kingdom of Ireland, with the Right Honourable Lady Frances Manners his now Wife, and to enable him to marry again; and for other Purposes therein mentioned.
Naper Name and Arms Act 1777	17 Geo. 3. c. 132 Pr.	16 May 1777
An Act to enable William Dutton Esquire, his First and other Sons, and their Issue Male, to take, use, and bear the Name and Arms of Naper, pursuant to the Will of James Lenox Dutton Esquire, deceased; and for making the Exemplification of the Will and Codicil of the said James Lenox Dutton, under the Great Seal of Great Britain, Evidence in all Courts of Law and Equity in Great Britain and Ireland.
Rebow's Name Act 1777	17 Geo. 3. c. 133 Pr.	16 May 1777
An Act to enable Isaac Martin Rebow Esquire, to take and use the Surname of Martin, pursuant to the Will of Matthew Martin Esquire, deceased.
Naturalization of Maria Perry Act 1777	17 Geo. 3. c. 134 Pr.	16 May 1777
An Act for naturalizing Maria Perry.
Naturalization of Charles Morris Klanert Act 1777	17 Geo. 3. c. 135 Pr.	16 May 1777
An Act for naturalizing Charles Morris Klanert.
Pettus' Estate Act 1777	17 Geo. 3. c. 136 Pr.	2 June 1777
An Act for vesting an undivided Moiety of certain Freehold and Copyhold Estates, late of Dame Elizabeth Pettus deceased, in Trustees, to convey and furrender the same respectively, pursuant to an Agreement for the Sale thereof; and for laying out the Money in the Purchase of other Lands and Hereditaments, to be settled to the like Uses.
Barnsley Inclosure Act 1777	17 Geo. 3. c. 137 Pr.	2 June 1777
An Act for dividing, allotting, and enclosing, several Commons, Moors or Waste Grounds, and Open Common Fields, in the Township of Barnsley, within the Parish of Silkston, in the County of York.
Earl Stoke Inclosure Act 1777	17 Geo. 3. c. 138 Pr.	2 June 1777
An Act for dividing and enclosing the Common Fields, Common Meadows, Stinted Pasture, and Commonable Lands, within the Parish of Earl Stoke, in the County of Wilts.
Ashton Keynes Inclosure Act 1777	17 Geo. 3. c. 139 Pr.	2 June 1777
An Act for dividing, allotting, and enclosing, the Open and Common Fields, Common Meadows, Common Pastures, and other Commonable Grounds, in the Manor and Parish of Ashton Keynes, in the County of Wilts.
Surfleet Inclosure Act 1777	17 Geo. 3. c. 140 Pr.	2 June 1777
An Act for dividing and enclosing the Common Fen, Common Marsh, Common Fields, and Waste Grounds, in the Parish of Surfleet, in the County of Lincoln.
Cantley Inclosure Act 1777	17 Geo. 3. c. 141 Pr.	2 June 1777
An Act for dividing and enclosing the several Open Common Fields, Meadows, Pastures, Commons, and Waste Grounds, within the Townships of Cantley, Brampton, Bessncarr, and High Ellers, within the several Manors of Brampton and Bessacarr, in the Parish of Cantley, in the West Riding of the County of York.
Melbourn and Storthwaite Inclosure Act 1777	17 Geo. 3. c. 142 Pr.	2 June 1777
An Act for dividing and enclosing the several Open Fields, Carrs, Ings or Meadow Grounds, and Commons or Waste Grounds, within the Townships of Melbourn and Storthwaite, within the Manor of Melbourn with Storthwaite, in the Parish of Thornton, in the East Riding of the County of York.
Shapwick Inclosure Act 1777	17 Geo. 3. c. 143 Pr.	6 June 1777
An Act for dividing and enclosing the Common or Waste Ground, called Shapwick Moor or Shapwick Turf Moor, in the Parish of Shapwick, in the County of Somerset.

=== Sources ===
- Pickering, Danby, ed. (1775). "17 George III - 1776-7". The Statutes at Large. Vol. 31. Cambridge: Charles Bathurst – via Google Books. ??
- Journals of the House of Commons. Vol. 36. London: His Majesty's Stationery Office. 1803. pp. 3–540 – via Google Books.
- Chronological Table of and Index to the Statutes. Vol. 1: To the End of the Session 59 Vict. Sess. 2 (1895) (13th ed.). London: Her Majesty's Stationery Office. 1896. pp. 133–134 – via Google Books.

== See also ==
- List of acts of the Parliament of Great Britain
