= House of Commons Qualification Act 1838 =

Act of the Parliament of the United Kingdom

- Act of Parliament
- Parliament of the United Kingdom
- Long title: An Act to amend the Laws relating to the Qualification of Members to serve in Parliament.
- Citation: 1 & 2 Vict. c. 48
- Territorial extent: United Kingdom

Dates
- Royal assent: 27 July 1838
- Commencement: 27 July 1838 (Note: The Acts of Parliament (Commencement) Act 1793.)
- Repealed: 28 June 1858
Other legislation
| Repeals/revokes | Parliament Act 1710; Qualification of Members of House of Commons Act 1759 |
| Repealed by | Property Qualification for Members of Parliament Act 1858 |

Status: Repealed

Text of statute as originally enacted

The House of Commons Qualification Act 1838 (1 & 2 Vict. c. 48) was an act of the Parliament of the United Kingdom, signed into law on 27 July 1838.

Section 1 of the act repealed the Parliament Act 1710 (9 Ann. c. 5) and Qualification of Members of House of Commons Act 1759 (33 Geo. 2. c. 20).

The act provided that no person would be capable of being elected as a member of the House of Commons for any county, unless he possessed an estate, or other income, of the clear annual value of £600 over and above any encumbrances. The same provision applied to members for cities or boroughs, and the Cinque Ports, except that in these cases the income needed only be £300 per annum.

Candidates at elections were, if required, to declare to the returning officer (or a commissioner or a justice) that they possessed such estate; this would be certified under a penalty of £100 for a false declaration. If the declaration was found to be false on the advice of an informer, then they would obtain half the penalty.

Every member was to deliver a statement of qualification to the table of the House of Commons and make such a declaration before they could take their seat or vote; a false declaration would make them guilty of a misdemeanour.

If the member took his seat, or voted, before complying with the provisions of the act, then his election would be considered void. The act did not extend to the members for university constituencies, or to the eldest sons of peers.

== Subsequent developments ==
The whole act was repealed by Property Qualification for Members of Parliament Act 1858 (21 & 22 Vict. c. 26), which came into force on 28 June 1858.

== Bibliography ==
- The British almanac of the Society for the Diffusion of Useful Knowledge, for the year 1839. The Society for the Diffusion of Useful Knowledge, London, 1839.
