= List of acts of the Parliament of Great Britain from 1759 =

This is a complete list of acts of the Parliament of Great Britain for the year 1759.

For acts passed until 1707, see the list of acts of the Parliament of England and the list of acts of the Parliament of Scotland. See also the list of acts of the Parliament of Ireland.

For acts passed from 1801 onwards, see the list of acts of the Parliament of the United Kingdom. For acts of the devolved parliaments and assemblies in the United Kingdom, see the list of acts of the Scottish Parliament, the list of acts of the Northern Ireland Assembly, and the list of acts and measures of Senedd Cymru; see also the list of acts of the Parliament of Northern Ireland.

The number shown after each act's title is its chapter number. Acts are cited using this number, preceded by the year(s) of the reign during which the relevant parliamentary session was held; thus the Union with Ireland Act 1800 is cited as "39 & 40 Geo. 3. c. 67", meaning the 67th act passed during the session that started in the 39th year of the reign of George III and which finished in the 40th year of that reign. Note that the modern convention is to use Arabic numerals in citations (thus "41 Geo. 3" rather than "41 Geo. III"). Acts of the last session of the Parliament of Great Britain and the first session of the Parliament of the United Kingdom are both cited as "41 Geo. 3".

Acts passed by the Parliament of Great Britain did not have a short title; however, some of these acts have subsequently been given a short title by acts of the Parliament of the United Kingdom (such as the Short Titles Act 1896).

Before the Acts of Parliament (Commencement) Act 1793 came into force on 8 April 1793, acts passed by the Parliament of Great Britain were deemed to have come into effect on the first day of the session in which they were passed. Because of this, the years given in the list below may in fact be the year before a particular act was passed.

== 33 Geo. 2 ==
The seventh session of the 11th Parliament of Great Britain, which met from 13 November 1759 until 22 May 1760.

This session was also traditionally cited as 33 G. 2.

=== Public acts ===
Short title	Citation	Royal assent
Long title
Land Tax Act 1759 (repealed)	33 Geo. 2. c. 1	12 December 1759
An Act for granting an Aid to His Majesty, by a Land Tax, to be raised in Great Britain, for the Service of the Year One Thousand Seven Hundred and Sixty. (Repealed by Statute Law Revision Act 1867 (30 & 31 Vict. c. 59))
Militia Act 1759 (repealed)	33 Geo. 2. c. 2	12 December 1759
An Act to enable His Majesty's Lieutenants of the several Counties, Ridings, or Places, in that Part of Great Britain called England, to proceed in the Execution of the Laws relating to the Militia, notwithstanding any Suspension of the same; and for other Purposes relating to the said Laws. (Repealed by Statute Law Revision Act 1867 (30 & 31 Vict. c. 59))
Taxation Act 1759 (repealed)	33 Geo. 2. c. 3	12 December 1759
An Act for continuing, and granting to His Majesty, certain Duties upon Malt, Mum, Cyder, and Perry, for the Service of the Year One Thousand Seven Hundred and Sixty. (Repealed by Statute Law Revision Act 1867 (30 & 31 Vict. c. 59))
Importation Act 1759 (repealed)	33 Geo. 2. c. 4	20 December 1759
An Act to continue, for a further Time, the prohibition of the making of Low Wines and Spirits, from Wheat, Barley, Malt, or any other Sort of Grain, or from Meal, Flour, or Bran. (Determined by Distillation Act 1759 (33 Geo. 2. c. 9) and repealed by Statute Law Revision Act 1867 (30 & 31 Vict. c. 59))
Importation (No. 2) Act 1759 (repealed)	33 Geo. 2. c. 5	20 December 1759
An Act to continue, for a limited Time, the Importation of Salted Beef, Pork, and Butter, from Ireland. (Repealed by Statute Law Revision Act 1867 (30 & 31 Vict. c. 59))
Mutiny Act 1759 (repealed)	33 Geo. 2. c. 6	20 December 1759
An Act for punishing Mutiny and Desertion; and for the better Payment of the Army and their Quarters. (Repealed by Statute Law Revision Act 1867 (30 & 31 Vict. c. 59))
Malt Duties, etc. Act 1759 (repealed)	33 Geo. 2. c. 7	4 February 1760
An Act for granting to His Majesty several Duties upon Malt; and for raising the Sum of Eight Millions, by Way of Annuities and a Lottery, to be charged on the said Duties, and to prevent the fraudulent obtaining of Allowances in the gauging of Corn making into Malt; and for making forth Duplicates of Exchequer Bills, Tickets, Certificates, Receipts, Annuity Orders, and other Orders, lost, burnt, or otherwise destroyed. (Repealed by Inland Revenue Act 1880 (43 & 44 Vict. c. 20))
Marine Mutiny Act 1759 (repealed)	33 Geo. 2. c. 8	24 March 1760
An Act for the Regulation of His Majesty's Marine Forces while on Shore. (Repealed by Statute Law Revision Act 1867 (30 & 31 Vict. c. 59))
Distillation Act 1759 (repealed)	33 Geo. 2. c. 9	15 April 1760
An Act for preventing the excessive Use of Spirituous Liquors, by laying additional Duties thereon; for shortening the Prohibition of making Low Wines and Spirits from Wheat, Barley, Malt, or other Grain, and from Meal, Flour, and Bran; for encouraging the Exportation of British-made Spirits; and for more effectually securing the Duties payable upon Spirits, and preventing the fraudulent Importation or Relanding thereof. (Repealed by Statute Law Revision Act 1867 (30 & 31 Vict. c. 59))
Duchy of Cornwall Act 1759 (repealed)	33 Geo. 2. c. 10	15 April 1760
An Act to enable His Majesty to make Leases and Copies of Offices, Lands, and Hereditaments, Parcel of His Dutchy of Cornwall, or annexed to the same; and for other Purposes therein mentioned. (Repealed by Statute Law Revision Act 1948 (11 & 12 Geo. 6. c. 62))
Purfleet, Portsmouth, Chatham, Plymouth Fortifications Act 1759	33 Geo. 2. c. 11	15 April 1760
An Act for taking down and removing the Magazine for Gunpowder, and all Buildings thereto belonging, situate near Greenwich in the County of Kent; and erecting instead thereof a new Magazine for Gunpowder at Purfleet near the River of Thames in the County of Essex; and applying a Sum of Money granted in this Session of Parliament towards those Purposes; and for obviating Difficulties arisen upon an Act made in the last Session of Parliament, for making Compensation for Lands and Hereditaments purchased for His Majesty's Service, at Portsmouth, Chatham, and Plymouth.
National Debt Act 1759 (repealed)	33 Geo. 2. c. 12	22 May 1760
An Act for adding certain Annuities, granted in the Year One Thousand Seven Hundred and Fifty-nine, to the Joint Stock of Three per Centum Annuities, consolidated by the Acts of the Twenty-fifth, (Note: National Debt (No. 2) Act 1751 (25 Geo. 2. c. 27)) Twenty-eighth, (Note: Supply, etc. Act 1755 (28 Geo. 2. c. 22)) Twenty-ninth, (Note: National Debt Act 1756 (29 Geo. 2. c. 7)) and Thirty-second, (Note: National Debt (No. 2) Act 1758 (32 Geo. 2. c. 22)) Years of His present Majesty's Reign; and for carrying the several Duties therein mentioned to the Sinking Fund; and for cancelling such Lottery Tickets as were made forth in Pursuance of an Act of the Thirtieth Year of His present Majesty's Reign, (Note: Public Lottery Act 1757 (30 Geo. 2. c. 5)) and were not disposed of. (Repealed by Statute Law Revision Act 1870 (33 & 34 Vict. c. 69))
Papists Act 1759 (repealed)	33 Geo. 2. c. 13	22 May 1760
An Act for allowing further Time for Enrolment of Deeds and Wills made by Papists; and for Relief of Protestant Purchasers. (Repealed by Statute Law Revision Act 1867 (30 & 31 Vict. c. 59))
Enlargement of Time for First Meetings Act 1759 (repealed)	33 Geo. 2. c. 14	22 May 1760
An Act for enlarging the Times for the First Meetings of Commissioners, or Trustees, for putting in Execution certain Acts of this Session of Parliament. (Repealed by Statute Law Revision Act 1867 (30 & 31 Vict. c. 59))
Exportation Act 1759 (repealed)	33 Geo. 2. c. 15	22 May 1760
An Act for rendering the Exportation of Culm from the Harbour of Milford, in the County of Pembroke, and the Limits thereof, to the neighbouring Counties, more easy to the Proprietors and Purchasers of the same; and for better securing the Duties payable thereon. (Repealed by Statute Law Revision Act 1867 (30 & 31 Vict. c. 59))
Continuance of Laws Act 1759 (repealed)	33 Geo. 2. c. 16	22 May 1760
An Act to continue several Laws therein mentioned, relating to the clandestine Running of uncustomed Goods, and preventing Frauds relating to the Customs; to prevent the clandestine Running of Goods, and the Danger of Infection thereby; to the granting Liberty to carry Rice from His Majesty's Province of Carolina in America, directly to any Part of Europe Southward of Cape Finisterre, in Ships built and navigated according to Law; to the Free Importation of Cochineal and Indico; to the prohibiting the Importation of Books re-printed Abroad, and first composed, written, and printed, in Great Britain; and for allowing further Time for making Affidavits of the Execution of Articles or Contracts of Clerks to Attornies or Solicitors, and filing thereof. (Repealed by Statute Law Revision Act 1867 (30 & 31 Vict. c. 59))
Sail Cloth Act 1759 (repealed)	33 Geo. 2. c. 17	22 May 1760
An Act to continue an Act made in the Twelfth Year of the Reign of Her late Majesty Queen Anne, intituled, "An Act for the better Encouragement of the making of Sail Cloth in Great Britain." (Note: Sail Cloth Manufacture Act 1712 (12 Ann. c. 12)) (Repealed by Statute Law Revision Act 1867 (30 & 31 Vict. c. 59))
Supply, etc. Act 1759 (repealed)	33 Geo. 2. c. 18	22 May 1760
An Act for enabling His Majesty to raise the Sum of One Million, for the Uses and Purposes therein mentioned; and for further appropriating certain Supplies granted in this Session of Parliament. (Repealed by Statute Law Revision Act 1867 (30 & 31 Vict. c. 59))
Prize, Greenwich Hospital etc. Act 1759 (repealed)	33 Geo. 2. c. 19	22 May 1760
An Act for the more effectual securing the Payment of such Prize and Bounty-monies as were appropriated to the Use of Greenwich Hospital by an Act made in the Twenty-ninth Year of the Reign of His present Majesty, intituled, "An Act for the Encouragement of Seamen, and for the more speedy and effectual Manning His Majesty's Navy." (Note: Naval Prize, etc. Act 1756 (29 Geo. 2. c. 34)) (Repealed by Naval Prize Acts Repeal Act 1864 (27 & 28 Vict. c. 23))
Qualification of Members of House of Commons Act 1759 (repealed)	33 Geo. 2. c. 20	22 May 1760
An Act to enforce and render more effectual the Laws relating to the Qualification of Members to sit in the House of Commons. (Repealed by House of Commons Qualification Act 1838 (1 & 2 Vict. c. 48) and Property Qualification for Members of Parliament Act 1858 (21 & 22 Vict. c. 26))
Supply Act 1759 (repealed)	33 Geo. 2. c. 21	22 May 1760
An Act for granting to His Majesty a certain Sum of Money, out of the Sinking Fund, for the Service of the Year One Thousand Seven Hundred and Sixty. (Repealed by Statute Law Revision Act 1867 (30 & 31 Vict. c. 59))
Militia (No. 2) Act 1759 (repealed)	33 Geo. 2. c. 22	22 May 1760
An Act for limiting, consining, and better regulating, the Payment of the Weekly Allowances made by Act of Parliament for the Maintenance of Families unable to support themselves during the Absence of Militia-men embodied and ordered out into actual Service; and for explaining so much of an Act made in this Session of Parliament, intituled, "An Act for punishing Mutiny and Desertion, and for the better Payment of the Army and their Quarters," (Note: Mutiny Act 1759 (33 Geo. 2. c. 6)) as relates to the Militia when embodied, and in actual Service; and for explaining and amending certain Parts of the Laws now in Force, for the better Ordering of the Militia Forces in that Part of Great Britain called England. (Repealed by Statute Law Revision Act 1867 (30 & 31 Vict. c. 59))
Supply (No. 2) Act 1759 (repealed)	33 Geo. 2. c. 23	22 May 1760
An Act for enabling His Majesty to raise a certain Sum of Money, towards paying off and discharging the Debt of the Navy, and towards Naval Services, for the Year One Thousand Seven Hundred and Sixty. (Repealed by Statute Law Revision Act 1867 (30 & 31 Vict. c. 59))
Militia Pay Act 1759 (repealed)	33 Geo. 2. c. 24	22 May 1760
An Act for applying the Money granted in this Session of Parliament, towards defraying the Charge of Pay and Cloathing of the unembodied Militia for One Year, ending the Twenty-fifth Day of March, One Thousand Seven Hundred and Sixty-one; and for explaining certain Parts of the Acts for the better Ordering of the Militia Forces within that Part of Great Britain called England, relating to the Money to be given to Private Militia-men, upon their being ordered out into actual Service; and to the Cloaths of Private Militia-men; and to the Time of the Commencement of the Pay of the embodied Militia. (Repealed by Statute Law Revision Act 1867 (30 & 31 Vict. c. 59))
Hackney Chairs, etc. Act 1759 (repealed)	33 Geo. 2. c. 25	22 May 1760
An Act for continuing certain Laws, relating to the additional Number of One Hundred Hackney Chairs; and to the Powers given for regulating Hackney Coaches and Chairs. (Repealed by London Hackney Carriage Act 1831 (1 & 2 Will. 4. c. 22))
Treason, etc. Act 1759 (repealed)	33 Geo. 2. c. 26	22 May 1760
An Act for reviving and continuing so much of an Act, made in the Twenty-first Year of His present Majesty's Reign, (Note: Sheriffs (Scotland) Act 1747 (21 Geo. 2. c. 19)) as relates to the more effectual Trial and Punishment of High Treason and Misprision of High Treason, in The Highlands of Scotland; and also for continuing Two other Acts, one made in the Nineteenth Year, (Note: Disarming the Highlands, etc. Act 1745 (19 Geo. 2. c. 39)) and the other made in the Twenty-first Year, of His present Majesty's Reign, (Note: Cattle Theft (Scotland) Act 1747 (21 Geo. 2. c. 34)) so far as they relate to the more effectual disarming The Highlands of Scotland, and for securing the Peace thereof. (Repealed by Statute Law Revision Act 1867 (30 & 31 Vict. c. 59))
Fish Act 1759 (repealed)	33 Geo. 2. c. 27	22 May 1760
An Act to repeal so much of an Act passed in the Twenty-ninth Year of His present Majesty's Reign, (Note: Fish Act 1756 (29 Geo. 2. c. 39)) concerning a Free Market for Fish at Westminster, as requires Fishermen to enter their Fishing Vessels at the Office of the Searcher of the Customs at Gravesend; and to regulate the Sale of Fish at the First Hand in the Fish Markets in London and Westminster; and to prevent Salesmen of Fish buying Fish to sell again on their own Account; and to allow Bret and Turbot, Brill and Pearl, although under the respective Dimensions mentioned in a former Act, (Note: Fish Act 1714 (1 Geo. 1. St. 2. c. 18)) to be imported and sold; and to punish Persons who shall take or sell any Spawn, Brood, or Fry, of Fish, unsizeable Fish, or Fish out of Season, or Smelts under the Size of Five Inches; and for other Purposes. (Repealed by Sea Fisheries Act 1868 (31 & 32 Vict. c. 45))
Exportation (No. 2) Act 1759 (repealed)	33 Geo. 2. c. 28	22 May 1760
An Act for encouraging the Exportation of Rum and Spirits of the Growth, Produce, and Manufacture, of the British Sugar Plantations from this Kingdom, and of British-made Spirits made from Melasses. (Repealed by Statute Law Revision Act 1867 (30 & 31 Vict. c. 59))
Indemnity Act 1759 (repealed)	33 Geo. 2. c. 29	22 May 1760
An Act to indemnify Persons who have omitted to qualify themselves for Offices and Employments; and to indemnify Justices of the Peace, Deputy Lieutenants, Officers of the Militia, and others, who have omitted to register or to deliver in their Qualifications within the Time limited by Law; and for giving further Time for those Purposes. (Repealed by Statute Law Revision Act 1867 (30 & 31 Vict. c. 59))
London Streets, City Act 1759	33 Geo. 2. c. 30	22 May 1760
An Act for widening certain Streets, Lanes, and Passages, within the City of London and Liberties thereof; and for opening certain new Streets and Ways within the same; and for other Purposes therein mentioned.
Courts Baron of High Peak and Castleton Act 1759 (repealed)	33 Geo. 2. c. 31	22 May 1760
An Act for regulating the Proceedings in Personal Actions in the respective Courts Baron of the Hundred of High Peak and Manor of Castleton, in the County of Derby. (Repealed by County Courts Act 1846 (9 & 10 Vict. c. 95))
Isle of Ely, Suffolk, Norfolk Drainage Act 1759	33 Geo. 2. c. 32	22 May 1760
An Act for draining and preserving certain Fen Lands and Low Grounds in the Isle of Ely and Counties of Suffolk and Norfolk, between Mildenhall River South, Plant Load and Brandon River North, bounded on the West by the River Ouse, and on the East by Winter Load, Earswell Brooke, and the Hard Lands of Mildenhall; and for empowering the Governor, Bailiffs, and Commonalty of the Company of Conservators of the Great Level of the Fens, commonly called Bedford Level, to sell certain Fen Lands, lying within the Limits aforesaid, commonly called Invested Lands.
Derby Roads Act 1759 (repealed)	33 Geo. 2. c. 33	24 March 1760
An Act to amend and render more effectual Two Acts, passed in the Eleventh (Note: Derby Roads Act 1737 (11 Geo. 2. c. 33)) and Seventeenth (Note: Derby Roads Act 1743 (17 Geo. 2. c. 20)) Years of the Reign of His present Majesty, for repairing several Roads leading to and from the Town of Derby, in the County of Derby. (Repealed by Road from Cavendish Bridge to Hulland Ward (Derbyshire) Act 1827 (7 & 8 Geo. 4. c. l))
Gloucester and Hereford Roads Act 1759 (repealed)	33 Geo. 2. c. 34	24 March 1760
An Act for making more effectual, and continuing the Term, and enlarging and altering the Powers, of an Act made in the Twentieth Year of His present Majesty's Reign, (Note: Gloucester and Hereford Roads Act 1746 (20 Geo. 2. c. 31)) for repairing and widening the Road leading from the City of Gloucester towards the City of Hereford; and for repairing other Roads in the County of Gloucester, in the said Act mentioned. (Repealed by Roads from Newent Act 1824 (5 Geo. 4. c. xi), Roads from Gloucester City Act 1833 (3 & 4 Will. 4. c. lv) and Roads through Huntley from Gloucester Act 1833 (3 & 4 Will. 4. c. lxxv))
New Shoreham Harbour Act 1759 (repealed)	33 Geo. 2. c. 35	24 March 1760
An Act for erecting Piers and other Works, for the Security and Improvement of the Harbour of New Shoreham, in the County of Sussex; and for keeping the same in Repair. (Repealed by Shoreham Harbour Act 1816 (56 Geo. 3. c. lxxxi))
Okehampton Roads Act 1759 (repealed)	33 Geo. 2. c. 36	15 April 1760
An Act for repairing several Roads leading to the Town of Oakhampton, in the County of Devon. (Repealed by Okehampton Roads Act 1823 (4 Geo. 4. c. civ))
Beaconsfield and Stokenchurch Road Act 1759 (repealed)	33 Geo. 2. c. 37	15 April 1760
An Act for enlarging the Term and Powers of Two Acts, made in the Fifth Year of His late Majesty, (Note: Beaconsfield and Stokenchurch Road Act 1718 (5 Geo. 1. c. 2 Pr.)) and in the Ninth Year of His present Majesty's Reign, (Note: Beaconsfield and Stokenchurch Road Act 1735 (9 Geo. 2. c. 11)) for repairing the Road from Beaconsfield in the County of Bucks, to Stoken Church in the County of Oxon. (Repealed by Beaconsfield and Stokenchurch Road Act 1823 (4 Geo. 4. c. cviii))
Market Harborough and Brampton Road Act 1759 (repealed)	33 Geo. 2. c. 38	15 April 1760
An Act for enlarging the Term and Powers, granted by an Act made in the Twenty-fifth Year of the Reign of His present Majesty, (Note: Market Harborough and Brampton Road Act 1751 (25 Geo. 2. c. 57)) for repairing and widening the Road leading from Market Harborough in the County of Leicester to the Pound in the Parish of Brampton in the County of Huntingdon; and by one other Act, made in the Twenty-seventh Year of the Reign of His present Majesty, (Note: Market Harborough and Brampton Road Act 1754 (27 Geo. 2. c. 28)) for explaining, amending, and rendering more effectual, the said former Act. (Repealed by Market Harborough and Brampton Road Act 1820 (1 Geo. 4. c. lxxx) and Road from Market Harborough to Brampton (Huntingdonshire) Road Act 1841 (4 & 5 Vict. c. xxxv))
Derbyshire Roads Act 1759 (repealed)	33 Geo. 2. c. 39	15 April 1760
An Act for repairing and widening the Road from the Turnpike Road near the West End of the Town of Chesterfield to Matlock Bridge, and also the Road leading out of the said Road over Darley Bridge to Cross Green, and also the Road leading out of the last-mentioned Road to the Turnpike Road near Rowesly Bridge, in the County of Derby. (Repealed by Roads from Chesterfield to Matlock Bridge Act 1823 (4 Geo. 4. c. xxviii))
Kent Roads Act 1759 (repealed)	33 Geo. 2. c. 40	15 April 1760
An Act for extending the Powers, granted by an Act passed in the Twenty-fifth Year of the Reign of His present Majesty, (Note: Kent Roads Act 1751 (25 Geo. 2. c. 8)) for repairing the Road leading from The Royal Oak on Wrotham Heath to the Town of Wrotham in the County of Kent, and from thence to the Village of Foot's Cray in the said County to the Road leading from The Royal Oak on Wrotham Heath to the Town of Maidstone. (Repealed by Kent Roads Act 1773 (13 Geo. 3. c. 98))
Leicester Roads Act 1759 (repealed)	33 Geo. 2. c. 41	15 April 1760
An Act for amending, widening, and keeping in Repair, the High Road from the Borough of Tamworth to Ashby de la Zouch in the County of Leicester, and from Sawley Ferry in the said County, to a Turnpike Gate at or near the End of Swareliff Lane leading to Ashby de la Zouch aforesaid. (Repealed by Roads from Tamworth and from Harrington Bridge Act 1823 (4 Geo. 4. c. cxxii))
Cornwall Roads Act 1759 (repealed)	33 Geo. 2. c. 42	15 April 1760
An Act for repairing and widening the Roads from Haleworthy in the Parish of Davidstow in the County of Cornwall to the East End of Wadebridge in the said County, and from the West End of Wadebridge aforesaid into and through the Borough of Mitchell in the said County. (Repealed by Road from Haleworthy to Wadebridge (Cornwall) Act 1825 (6 Geo. 4. c. xl))
Bucks Roads Act 1759 (repealed)	33 Geo. 2. c. 43	15 April 1760
An Act for enlarging the Term and Powers granted by several Acts of Parliament, of the Eighth Year of Her late Majesty Queen Anne, (Note: Northampton Highways Act 1709 (8 Ann. c. 9)) the Ninth Year of His late Majesty King George the First, (Note: Buckinghamshire Highways Act 1722 (9 Geo. 1. c. 13)) and the Fifteenth Year of His present Majesty's Reign, (Note: Buckinghamshire Roads (No. 2) Act 1741 (15 Geo. 2. c. 6)) for repairing the Highways between the House commonly called The Horse-shoe House in the Parish of Stoke Goldington in the County of Bucks, and the Town of Northampton, and the Road from the North Bridge of Newport Pagnel in the County of Bucks, to The Horse-shoe House. (Repealed by Newport Pagnell Roads Act 1797 (37 Geo. 3. c. 177))
Warwick and Northants Roads Act 1759 (repealed)	33 Geo. 2. c. 44	15 April 1760
An Act for enlarging the Terms and Powers contained in Two several Acts of Parliament, made in the Twelfth (Note: Warwick Roads Act 1738 (12 Geo. 2. c. 18)) and Sixteenth (Note: Warwick Roads Act 1742 (16 Geo. 2. c. 20)) Years of the Reign of His present Majesty, for repairing the Road from The Dun Cow (Note: The Dun Cow is located at the junction of the B4429 and the A426 in Dunchurch, Warwickshire. 52°20′14″N 1°17′23″W) in the Town of Dunchurch to the Town of Hill Morton in the County of Warwick, and from thence to Saint James's End in the Parish of Dunston in the County of Northampton; and for making the same Acts more effectual. (Repealed by Warwick and Northampton Roads Act 1781 (21 Geo. 3. c. 106))
River Wey Navigation Act 1759	33 Geo. 2. c. 45	15 April 1760
An Act for extending and continuing the Navigation of the River Wey, otherwise Wye, in the County of Surrey, to the Town of Godalming in the said County.
Leicester and Derby Roads Act 1759 (repealed)	33 Geo. 2. c. 46	15 April 1760
An Act for repairing and widening the High Roads from Hinckley to Woeful Bridge, and also from Hoo-Ash-Lane through Old Lane, and from Swannington to Lee Gutter, and from thence to Melbourn Common, and from Ibstock to Measham, in the Counties of Leicester and Derby. (Repealed by Road from Hinckley to Melbourne Common (Derbyshire) Act 1828 (9 Geo. 4. c. v))
Derby, Leicester and Warwick Roads Act 1759 (repealed)	33 Geo. 2. c. 47	22 May 1760
An Act for amending, widening, and keeping in Repair, several Roads therein mentioned, lying in the Counties of Derby, Leicester, and Warwick. (Repealed by Burton Bridge and Market Bosworth Road Act 1831 (1 Will. 4. c. x) and Measham and Fieldon Bridge Road (Derbyshire, Warwickshire) Act 1831 (1 Will. 4. c. xii))
Yorks and Lancaster Roads Act 1759 (repealed)	33 Geo. 2. c. 48	22 May 1760
An Act for diverting, altering, widening, repairing, and amending, the Roads from the Town of Halifax, and from Sowerby Bridge, in the County of York, by Todmorden, to Burnley and Littleborough, in the County of Lancaster. (Repealed by Halifax and Sowerby Bridge and Burnley and Littleborough Roads Act 1800 (39 & 40 Geo. 3. c. xiii) and Todmorden and Burnley, Littleborough, and Halifax Roads Act 1821 (1 & 2 Geo. 4. c. cxi))
River Weaver Navigation Act 1759	33 Geo. 2. c. 49	22 May 1760
An Act to amend an Act passed in the Seventh Year of the Reign of His late Majesty King George the First, (Note: River Weaver Navigation Act 1720 (7 Geo. 1. St. 1. c. 10)) for making the River Weaver navigable, from Frodsham Bridge to Winsford Bridge, in the County of Chester; and for the more effectual preserving and improving the Navigation of the said River.
Worcester Roads Act 1759 (repealed)	33 Geo. 2. c. 50	22 May 1760
An Act for amending, widening, and keeping in Repair, several Roads leading from the Market House in the Town of Kidderminster, in the County of Worcester. (Repealed by Kidderminster Roads Act 1777 (17 Geo. 3. c. 75))
Chester to Birmingham Road Act 1759 (repealed)	33 Geo. 2. c. 51	22 May 1760
An Act for repairing and widening the Road from the Bars at Boughton, within the Liberties of the City of Chester, to Whitchurch, and from thence to Newport in the County of Salop, to Ivetsey Bank in the County of Stafford, and from thence to Castle Bromwich and Stone Bridge in the Parish of Hampton on Arden, in the County of Warwick, and from Castle Bromwich to Birmingham in the same County. (Repealed by Road from Whitchurch (Salop.) to Ternhill Act 1822 (3 Geo. 4. c. lxiv), Welsh Harp and Stonebridge, and Castle Bromwich and Birmingham Roads Act 1823 (4 Geo. 4. c. cxxi) and Road from Ternhill to Newport (Salop.) Act 1832 (2 & 3 Will. 4. c. lxxii) (Note: Incorrectly cited as "3 & 4 Will. 4. c. lxxii" in the Chronological Table of the Statutes.))
Bristol Bridge Act 1759	33 Geo. 2. c. 52	22 May 1760
An Act for re-building, widening, and enlarging, the Bridge over the River Avon in the City of Bristol, and erecting a temporary Bridge adjoining; and for widening the Streets, Lanes, Ways, and Passages, leading thereto; and for building another Bridge over some other Part of the said River within the said City, if necessary; and for opening proper Ways and Passages thereto.
Dalkeith Beer Duties Act 1759 (repealed)	33 Geo. 2. c. 53	22 May 1760
An Act for laying a Duty of Two Pennies Scots, or One Sixth Part of a Penny Sterling, on every Scots Pint of Ale, Porter, or Beer, brewed for Sale, or vended, within the Town and Parish of Dalkeith. (Repealed by Statute Law Revision Act 1948 (11 & 12 Geo. 6. c. 62))
Leeds Bridge Act 1759	33 Geo. 2. c. 54	22 May 1760
An Act for raising Money for finishing and completing the Repair of Leeds Bridge, in the County of York; and for the purchasing and taking down the Houses and Buildings which straiten and obstruct the Passage to and over the said Bridge.
Yorkshire Roads Act 1759 (repealed)	33 Geo. 2. c. 55	22 May 1760
An Act for amending and widening the Road from Bawtry to Sheffield, and from Sheffield to the South Side of Wortley, in the County of York, where it joins the Turnpike Road leading from Rotherham to Manchester. (Repealed by Bawtry and Tinsley Turnpike Road Act 1825 (6 Geo. 4. c. xc))
Durham Roads Act 1759 (repealed)	33 Geo. 2. c. 56	22 May 1760
An Act for repairing and widening the Roads from Deanburn Bridge, through Greenlaw and Part of the Jedburgh Road, by Lauder in the Shire of Berwick, to Cornhill in the County of Durham; and for building a Bridge over The Tweed, near Coldstream. (Repealed by Road from Deanburn to Cornhill and Coldstream Bridge Act 1825 (6 Geo. 4. c. xli))
Maidstone to Cranbrook Road Act 1759 (repealed)	33 Geo. 2. c. 57	22 May 1760
An Act for the amending, widening, and keeping in Repair, the Road leading from the Thirty-nine Mile Stone at the Upper End of Stone Street in the Town of Maidstone in the County of Kent, to a certain Place called Tubb's Lake in the Parish of Cranbrooke in the said County. (Repealed by Maidstone and Cranbrook Road Act 1813 (53 Geo. 3. c. clxxxviii) and Annual Turnpike Acts Continuance Act 1867 (30 & 31 Vict. c. 121))
Hereford Roads, etc. Act 1759 (repealed)	33 Geo. 2. c. 58	22 May 1760
An Act for repairing the Roads from the Town of Brecon to the Parish of Brobury, and to Whitney Passage, in the County of Hereford; and for building a Bridge over the River Wye, at Bredwardine Passage in the same County. (Repealed by Whitney Bridge and Bredwardine Bridge and Hay Roads Act 1822 (3 Geo. 4. c. lxxxvii))
Launceston Roads Act 1759 (repealed)	33 Geo. 2. c. 59	22 May 1760
An Act for amending, widening, and keeping in Repair, several Roads leading to the Borough of Launceston, in the County of Cornwall. (Repealed by Launceston Turnpike Roads Act 1835 (5 & 6 Will. 4. c. lxv))

=== Private acts ===
Short title	Citation	Royal assent
Long title
Amsinck's, &c. Naturalization Act 1759	33 Geo. 2. c. 1 Pr.	20 December 1759
An Act for naturalizing Paul Amsinck the Younger and Helwig Lewis Tonnies.
Bridgewater Canal Act 1759	33 Geo. 2. c. 2 Pr.	24 March 1760
An Act to enable the most Noble Francis Duke of Bridgewater to make a Navigable Cut, or Canal, from or near Worsley Mill, over the River Irwell, to the Town of Manchester in the County Palatine of Lancaster, and to or near Longford Bridge in the Township of Stretford in the said County.
John Earl of Sandwich, Wellbore Ellis, and Robert Nugent oaths of office.	33 Geo. 2. c. 3 Pr.	24 March 1760
An Act to enable John Earl of Sandwich, Welbore Ellis Esquire, and Robert Nugent Esquire, to take, in Great Britain, the Oath of Office as Vice Treasurer, and Receiver General, and Paymaster General, of all His Majesty's Revenues in the Kingdom of Ireland; and to quality themselves for the Enjoyment of the said Offices.
Charterhouse Hospital Estate Act 1759	33 Geo. 2. c. 4 Pr.	24 March 1760
An Act to enable the Governors of the Hospital of King James, founded in Charter House, to grant Building or other Leases of some Parts of the Estates of the said Hospital, lying in the Parish of Saint James Clerkenwell, and elsewhere, in the County of Middlesex, for such Terms of Years as are therein mentioned.
Sulgrave Inclosure Act 1759	33 Geo. 2. c. 5 Pr.	24 March 1760
An Act for dividing and enclosing the Open and Common Fields, Common Meadows, Common Grounds, and Commonable Lands, within the Parish, Township, and Liberties, of Sulgrave, in the County of Northampton.
Mackworth Inclosure Act 1759	33 Geo. 2. c. 6 Pr.	24 March 1760
An Act for dividing and enclosing the Common Fields, Meadows, Pastures, and Waste Grounds, in the Parish of Mackworth, in the County of Derby.
Marston St. Lawrence Inclosure Act 1759	33 Geo. 2. c. 7 Pr.	24 March 1760
An Act for dividing and enclosing the Common Field, Common Pastures, Common Meadows, Common Grounds, and Waste Grounds, in Marston Saint Lawrence, in the County of Northampton.
Hoby Inclosure Act 1759	33 Geo. 2. c. 8 Pr.	24 March 1760
An Act for dividing and enclosing the Common and Open Fields in the Parish of Hoby, in the County of Leicester.
Litcham Inclosure Act 1759	33 Geo. 2. c. 9 Pr.	24 March 1760
An Act for dividing and enclosing the Common Fields within the Parish of Lutcham, alias Litcham, in the County of Norfolk; and for extinguishing the Rights of Common or Shackage in the said Common Fields, and certain other Lands in the said Parish, called Half-year Closes.
Somerby Inclosure Act 1759	33 Geo. 2. c. 10 Pr.	24 March 1760
An Act for dividing and enclosing the Open and Common Fields of Somerby, in the County of Leicester, and all the Lands and Grounds within the same Fields.
Bardford Inclosure Act 1759	33 Geo. 2. c. 11 Pr.	24 March 1760
An Act for dividing and enclosing the Common Fields, Common Pastures, Common Meadows, Waste Grounds, and Commonable Lands, in the Parish of Barford, in the County of Warwick.
Bondgate Inclosure Act 1759	33 Geo. 2. c. 12 Pr.	24 March 1760
An Act for dividing and enclosing the Moor or Common called Hunwicke Edge, in the Manor of Bondgate, and County of Durham.
Turner's Divorce Act 1759	33 Geo. 2. c. 13 Pr.	24 March 1760
An Act to dissolve the Marriage of Exuperius Turner Esquire with Elizabeth Louisa his now Wife; and to enable him to marry again; and for other Purposes therein mentioned.
Goodflesh's Divorce Act 1759	33 Geo. 2. c. 14 Pr.	24 March 1760
An Act to dissolve the Marriage of Mark Goodflesh Gentleman with Elizabeth Fielding his now Wife; and to enable him to marry again; and for other Purposes therein mentioned.
Hammet's Name Act 1759	33 Geo. 2. c. 15 Pr.	24 March 1760
An Act to enable James Hammett Esquire and his Issue to take and use the Surname of Hamlyn only
Stoffold's Name Act 1759	33 Geo. 2. c. 16 Pr.	24 March 1760
An Act to enable Henry Stoffold and Robert Stoffold Gentlemen, now called Henry Austen and Robert Austen, and their Heirs, to take and use the Surname and Arms of Austen, instead of their own Surname and Arms, pursuant to the Will of Robert Austen Esquire, deceased.
Hallet's Name Act 1759	33 Geo. 2. c. 17 Pr.	24 March 1760
An Act to qualify and enable Samuel Hallet Esquire, now called Samuel Farewell, and his Heirs, to use and take, in Exchange for his and their own Surname, the Surname of Farewell, pursuant to the Will of Nathaniel Farewell Esquire, deceased.
Lewis' Name Act 1759	33 Geo. 2. c. 18 Pr.	24 March 1760
An Act to enable Thomas Lewis Esquire and his Heirs Male to take, use, and bear the Surname and Arms of Lloyd, pursuant to the Will of Richard Lloyd Esquire, deceased.
Trapaud's, &c. Naturalization Act 1759	33 Geo. 2. c. 19 Pr.	24 March 1760
An Act for naturalizing Peter Trapaud, Nicholas Battier, Christopher Battier, John Ralph Battier, Abel Mitz, Peter Aubertin, John William Smith, Gabriel Anthony Ernst, Frederick Nicolas Graff, Emanuel Philip Bize, and David Samuel Henry Duveluz.
Spencer's Naturalization Act 1759	33 Geo. 2. c. 20 Pr.	24 March 1760
An Act for naturalizing Maria Elizabeth Spencer, Wife of Richard Spencer Esquire.
Nyth Salmon Fishing (Scotland) Act 1681 Repeal Act 1759	33 Geo. 2. c. 21 Pr.	15 April 1760
An Act for repealing an Act of the Parliament of Scotland, made in the Year One Thousand Six Hundred and Eighty-one, intituled; "Act anent the Salmon Fishing in the Water of Nith." (Note: Nyth Salmon Fishing (Scotland) Act 1681 (c. 101 (S)))
Owston Inclosure Act 1759	33 Geo. 2. c. 22 Pr.	15 April 1760
An Act for dividing and enclosing the Commons and Waste Grounds in the Manor and Constablery of Owston, in the West Riding of the County of York.
Longton Inclosure Act 1759	33 Geo. 2. c. 23 Pr.	15 April 1760
An Act for enclosing divers Parcels of Waste Grounds, or Commons, in Longton, in the County of Lancaster; and for enjoying Part thereof as a Stinted Pasture until the Enclosure of the same.
Harthill with Woodhall Inclosure Act 1759	33 Geo. 2. c. 24 Pr.	15 April 1760
An Act for dividing and enclosing a certain Common or Open Piece of Waste Ground, in the Parish or Township of Harthill with Woodhall, in the County of York.
Seagrave Inclosure Act 1759	33 Geo. 2. c. 25 Pr.	15 April 1760
An Act for dividing and enclosing several Open Fields, Meadows, and Commons, within the Lordship and Liberty of Seagrave, in the County of Leicester.
Hawkesworth Inclosure Act 1759	33 Geo. 2. c. 26 Pr.	15 April 1760
An Act for the dividing and enclosing the Open Fields, Meadow, and Common Pasture Grounds, and Waste Grounds, in the Manor and Parish of Hawksworth, in the County of Nottingham.
Ugglebarnby, &c. Inclosure Act 1759	33 Geo. 2. c. 27 Pr.	15 April 1760
An Act for dividing and enclosing the Moors, Commons, and Waste Grounds, in the Manors of Ugglebarnby and Eskdaleside, in the Parish of Whitby and County of York.
Hayton Inclosure Act 1759	33 Geo. 2. c. 28 Pr.	15 April 1760
An Act for dividing and allotting certain Open Arable Fields, Meadow and Pasture Grounds and Commons, in the Township of Hayton; in the County of Nottingham.
Lethieullier's Estate Act 1759	33 Geo. 2. c. 29 Pr.	15 April 1760
An Act for selling Part of the settled Estate of Smart Lethieullier Esquire, in the County of Essex; and for laying out the Money arising by such Sale in the Purchase of other Lands and Tenements, to be settled to the Uses of his Marriage Settlement.
Freeman's Estate Act 1759	33 Geo. 2. c. 30 Pr.	15 April 1760
An Act for vesting the Inheritance of certain Estates in the County of Northampton, Part of the entailed Estate of John Freeman Esquire, in him in Fee Simple; and for settling other Estates, in the Counties of Wilts and Middlesex, in Lieu thereof.
Coopey's Name Act 1759	33 Geo. 2. c. 31 Pr.	15 April 1760
An Act to enable John Coopey Doctor of Physic, and Humphry Brent Coopey his Brother, and their Issue Male, respectively, to take and use the Surname and Arms of Brent, pursuant to the Will of Humphry Brent, late of The Middle Temple, London, Esquire.
Cornabe's, &c. Naturalization Act 1759	33 Geo. 2. c. 32 Pr.	15 April 1760
An Act for naturalizing René Cornabé and John Daniel Lucadou.
Barrow upon Soar Inclosure Act 1759	33 Geo. 2. c. 33 Pr.	22 May 1760
An Act for dividing and enclosing the several Open and Common Fields, Meadows, and Commons, within the Lordship or Liberty of Barrow upon Soar, in the County of Leicester.
Adwick le Street Inclosure Act 1759	33 Geo. 2. c. 34 Pr.	22 May 1760
An Act for dividing and enclosing certain Open and Common Fields, Meadows, Commons, and Waste Grounds, within the Manor or Lordship of Adwicke in the Street, in the County of York.
West Farndon Inclosure Act 1759	33 Geo. 2. c. 35 Pr.	22 May 1760
An Act for dividing and enclosing the Common Fields, Common Pastures, Common Meadows, Common Grounds, and Waste Grounds, of and in the Manor, Hamlet, and Liberties, of West Farndon; in the Parish of Woodford, otherwise Halse Woodford, in the County of Northampton.
Southam Inclosure Act 1759	33 Geo. 2. c. 36 Pr.	22 May 1760
An Act for dividing and enclosing the Common Fields, Common Pastures, Common Meadows, Common Grounds, and Waste Grounds, in the Manor and Parish of Southam, in the County of Warwick.
Melton Mowbray Inclosure Act 1759	33 Geo. 2. c. 37 Pr.	22 May 1760
An Act for the dividing and enclosing the Open and Common Fields in the Parish of Melton Mowbray, in the County of Leicester.
Folkeswoth Inclosure Act 1759	33 Geo. 2. c. 38 Pr.	22 May 1760
An Act for enclosing and dividing the Common Fields, Common Meadows, and Pasture Grounds, within the Parish of Folkesworth, in the County of Huntingdon.
Broughton Sulney Inclosure Act 1759	33 Geo. 2. c. 39 Pr.	22 May 1760
An Act for dividing and enclosing the Open and Common Fields of Broughton Sulney, in the County of Nottingham.
Costock Inclosure Act 1759	33 Geo. 2. c. 40 Pr.	22 May 1760
An Act for dividing and enclosing the Open Fields of Costock, otherwise Cortlingstock, in the County of Nottingham, and all the Lands and Grounds within the said Open Fields.
Ardsley and Darfield Inclosure Act 1759	33 Geo. 2. c. 41 Pr.	22 May 1760
An Act for dividing and enclosing the Open Common in the Township of Ardsley, and Parish of Darfield, in The West Riding of the County of York.
Hinckley Inclosure Act 1759	33 Geo. 2. c. 42 Pr.	22 May 1760
An Act for enclosing and dividing the Open and Common Fields of Hinckley, in the County of Leicester.
Catton Inclosure Act 1759	33 Geo. 2. c. 43 Pr.	22 May 1760
An Act for dividing and enclosing several Open Fields, Commons, or Wastes, and Common Meadow Grounds, within the Manor and Soke of Catton, in the County of York.
Walton on the Hill Inclosure Act 1759	33 Geo. 2. c. 44 Pr.	22 May 1760
An Act for the enclosing and dividing divers Parcels of Commons and Waste Grounds, lying and being in the several Townships of Walton on the Hill and Fazokerley, in the Parish of Walton on the Hill aforesaid, and County Palatine of Lancaster.
Aspley Guise Inclosure Act 1759	33 Geo. 2. c. 45 Pr.	22 May 1760
An Act for enclosing and dividing the Common Fields, Common Meadows, Lammas Grounds, and other Common and Waste Lands, in the Manor and Parish of Aspley Guise, in the County of Bedford.
Coddington Inclosure Act 1759	33 Geo. 2. c. 46 Pr.	22 May 1760
An Act for dividing and enclosing the Common Fields, Common Meadows, and other Commonable Lands and Grounds; in the Parish of Coddington, in the County of Nottingham.
Blakesley Inclosure Act 1759	33 Geo. 2. c. 47 Pr.	22 May 1760
An Act for dividing and enclosing the Common Fields, Common Pastures, Common Meadows, and Common Grounds, in the Parish of Blakesley, in the County of Northampton, exclusive of the Hamlet of Woodend in the said Parish.
Clifton Inclosure Act 1759	33 Geo. 2. c. 48 Pr.	22 May 1760
An Act for dividing and enclosing certain Lands in the Parish of Clifton, in the County of Nottingham.
Frisby upon the Wreak Inclosure Act 1759	33 Geo. 2. c. 49 Pr.	22 May 1760
An Act for dividing and enclosing the Common Fields, Meadows, Pastures, and Waste Grounds, in the Parish of Frisby upon the Wreak, in the County of Leicester.
Misson Inclosure Act 1759	33 Geo. 2. c. 50 Pr.	22 May 1760
An Act for dividing and allotting the Common and Waste Grounds, Open Arable Fields, Meadows, and Pastures, in the Township and Parish of Misson, in the Counties of Nottingham and Lincoln, or One of them.
Fletton Inclosure Act 1759	33 Geo. 2. c. 51 Pr.	22 May 1760
An Act for dividing and enclosing the Open Fields and Grounds in the Manor and Parish of Fletton, in the County of Huntingdon.
Bergavenny Charities Act 1759	33 Geo. 2. c. 52 Pr.	22 May 1760
An Act for vesting the Inheritance of the Rectory and Tithes of Bedgeworth, granted by King Henry the Eighth to the late dissolved Corporation of Bergavenny, and by them leased to Jesus College in Oxford, towards maintaining a Fellow and Scholars from Bergavenny School; and for vesting other Rectories and Tithes in the County of Monmouth, granted by the said King Henry to the said Corporation; in Trustees, for supporting the said School, and for Relief of the Poor of the said Town.
Pennsylvania Land Company's Estates Act 1759	33 Geo. 2. c. 53 Pr.	22 May 1760
An Act for vesting certain Estates in Pennsylvania, New Jersey, and Maryland, belonging to the Proprietors of a Partnership, commonly called The Pennsylvania Land Company, in London, in Trustees, to be sold; and for other Purposes therein mentioned.
Duke of Devonshire's Estate Act 1759	33 Geo. 2. c. 54 Pr.	22 May 1760
An Act to empower the most Noble William Duke of Devonshire to make Leases, for any Term not exceeding Ninety-nine Years, of certain Estates lying in the Parish of Saint James, Westminster, in the County of Middlesex, devised to him by the Will of the Right Honourable Dorothy Countess of Burlington, deceased.
Marquis of Annandale's Estate Act 1759	33 Geo. 2. c. 55 Pr.	22 May 1760
An Act to enable John Earl of Hopetown, Curator of Law to George Vanden Bempde Marquis of Annandale his Uncle, a Lunatick, and the Curator of Law of the said Marquis for the Time being, to grant Feus of certain Lands; Houses, and others; in the County of Dumfries, and to exchange the Lands therein mentioned.
Chislehurst Charity Lands Act 1759	33 Geo. 2. c. 56 Pr.	22 May 1760
An Act for vesting several Lands and Tenements in the Parish of Chisleburst, in the County of Kent, given to charitable Uses for the Benefit of the said Parish, in the Right Honourable Robert Bertie Esquire, commonly called Lord Robert Bertie, and his Heirs; and for making Provision of greater Value instead thereof, for the Benefit of the Poor of the said Parish; and for other Purposes therein mentioned.
Spencer's Estate Act 1759	33 Geo. 2. c. 57 Pr.	22 May 1760
An Act to empower John Spencer Esquire to make Leases of the Manor of Wimbledon, and of Lands and Grounds in Wimbledon, Barnes, Mortlake, East Sheen, Putney, and Wandsworth, in the County of Surry, given and devised by, and purchased in Pursuance of, the Will of the most Noble Sarah late Dutchess Dowager of Marlborough, respectively, in order for building upon and improving the same.
Featherston's Estate Act 1759	33 Geo. 2. c. 58 Pr.	22 May 1760
An Act for Sale of Part of the settled Estate of Sir Mathew Fetherston Baronet, in the County of Essex; and for laying out the Money arising by such Sale in the Purchase of other Lands and Hereditaments, to be settled in Lieu thereof.
Keith's Forfeited Estates Act 1759	33 Geo. 2. c. 59 Pr.	22 May 1760
An Act to enable George Keith, late Earl Marischall, to sue or maintain any Action or Suit, notwithstanding his Attainder; and to remove any Disability in him, by Reason of his said Attainder; to take or inherit any Real or Personal Estate that may or shall hereafter descend or come to him, or which he was entitled unto, in Reversion or Remainder, before his Attainder.
Fagge's Estate Act 1759	33 Geo. 2. c. 60 Pr.	22 May 1760
An Act for vesting certain Tenemonts and Hereditaments in the County of Sussex, settled by John Meres Fagge Esquire upon the Marriage of Elizabeth his Daughter with Sir John Peachey Baronet, in Trustees, to convey the same to Sir William Peere Williams Baronet; and for settling Lands and Hereditaments in the County of Kent, of greater Value, in Lieu thereof.
Charteris' Estate Act 1759	33 Geo. 2. c. 61 Pr.	22 May 1760
An Act for Sale of Part of the entailed Estate of the late Francis Charteris Esquire; and for purchasing of other Lands, to be settled to the same Uses.
Beynon's Estate Act 1759	33 Geo. 2. c. 62 Pr.	22 May 1760
An Act for Sale of the Real Estate of Thomas Beynon Esquire, a Lunatick, for discharging the Encumbrances affecting the same; and for laying out the Residue of the Money arising by such Sale in the Purchase of other Lands and Hereditaments, for the Benefit of the said Thomas Beynon and his Heirs.
Raymond and Cator's Exchange Act 1759	33 Geo. 2. c. 63 Pr.	22 May 1760
An Act for exchanging certain Messuages, Lands, and Hereditaments, in the Parishes of Beckenham and Lewisham, in the County of Kent, Part of the Estate late of Hugh Raymond Esquire, deceased, for other Lands and Hereditaments, in the said Parish of Beckenham, belonging to John Cator the Younger; and for settling the Lands so taken in Exchange to the same Uses as the Lands given in Exchange stand limited; and for enabling Jones Raymond and Peter Burrell Esquires to grant Building Leases of other Parts of the Estate late of the said Hugh Raymond.
Strode's Estate Act 1759	33 Geo. 2. c. 64 Pr.	22 May 1760
An Act for selling certain Manors, Capital Messuages, Lands, and Hereditaments, in the County of Hertford, Comprized in a Settlement made by William Strode Esquire, deceased; and for purchasing, with the Money arising by such Sale, other Lands and Hereditaments, to be settled to the like Uses.
Thomas' Estate Act 1759	33 Geo. 2. c. 65 Pr.	22 May 1760
An Act for settling the Real Estate of James Thomas Esquire, deceased, pursuant to an Agreement between his Heir at Law and Devisee for that Purpose.
Westminster Abbey Estate Act 1759	33 Geo. 2. c. 66 Pr.	22 May 1760
An Act to enable the Dean and Chapter of the Collegiate Church of Saint Peter at Westminster, and their Successors, to make and grant unto James Mallors a Lease or Leases of certain Pieces of Ground, Messuages, Tenements, and Hereditaments, comprized within certain Limits, for a longer Term of Years than they are at present enabled to grant.
Wall's Estate Act 1759	33 Geo. 2. c. 67 Pr.	22 May 1760
An Act to empower John Wall the Grandfather, and Mary Wall the Guardian, of Anna Maria Wall, an Infant, to execute Articles, Leases, or Grants, for giving Liberty to drive a Sough through an Estate, called Cowley Estate, in the Parishes of Darley and Youlgreave, in the County of Derby, descended to and now vested in, the said Anna Maria Wall.
Russell's Name Act 1759	33 Geo. 2. c. 68 Pr.	22 May 1760
An Act to enable William Russell Esquire and his Issue to take and use the Surname of Kempe only, pursuant to the Will of William Kempe Esquire, deceased.

=== Sources ===
- Pickering, Danby, ed. (1766). "Anno tricesimo tertio Georgii II". The Statutes at Large. Vol. 23: From the Thirty Second Year of King George II to the First Year of King George III Inclusive. Cambridge: Joseph Bentham. pp. 1–108 – via Internet Archive.
- Pickering, Danby, ed. (1766). "Anno tricesimo tertio Georgii II". The Statutes at Large. Vol. 23: From the Thirty Second Year of King George II to the First Year of King George III Inclusive. Cambridge: Joseph Bentham. pp. 1–108 – via Google Books.
- Journals of the House of Commons. Vol. 28. London: His Majesty's Stationery Office. 1803. pp. 628–929 – via Google Books.
- Chronological Table of and Index to the Statutes. Vol. 1: To the End of the Session 59 Vict. Sess. 2 (1895) (13th ed.). London: Her Majesty's Stationery Office. 1896. pp. 119–120 – via Google Books.

== See also ==
- List of acts of the Parliament of Great Britain
