= Continuance of Laws (No. 2) Act 1788 =

Act of the Parliament of Great Britain

- Act of Parliament
- Parliament of Great Britain
- Long title: An Act to continue several Laws relating to the granting a Bounty on the Exportation of certain Species of British and Irish Linens exported, and taking off the Duties on the Importation of Foreign Raw Linen Yarns made of Flax, and to the preventing the committing of Frauds by Bankrupts, and for continuing and amending several Laws relating to the Imprisonment and Transportation of Offenders.
- Citation: 28 Geo. 3. c. 24
- Territorial extent: Great Britain

Dates
- Royal assent: 11 June 1788
- Commencement: 27 November 1787 (Note: Start of session.)
- Repealed: 21 August 1871

Other legislation
- Amends: See § Continued enactments
- Amended by: Transportation Act 1824
- Repealed by: Statute Law Revision Act 1871
- Relates to: Punishment of Burning in the Hand Act 1799; See Expiring laws continuance acts

Status: Repealed

Text of statute as originally enacted

The Continuance of Laws (No. 2) Act 1788 (28 Geo. 3. c. 24) was an act of the Parliament of Great Britain that continued various older acts.

== Background ==
In the United Kingdom, acts of Parliament remain in force until expressly repealed. Many acts of parliament, however, contained time-limited sunset clauses, requiring legislation to revive enactments that had expired or to continue enactments that would otherwise expire.

== Provisions ==
=== Continued enactments ===
Section 1 of the act continued the Exportation Act 1756 (29 Geo. 2. c. 15), as continued by the Exportation (No. 4) Act 1770 (10 Geo. 3. c. 38), the Bounties Act 1779 (19 Geo. 3. c. 27) and the Continuance of Laws Act 1787 (27 Geo. 3. c. 36), from the expiration of the act until the end of the next session of parliament after 24 June 1793.

Section 2 of the act continued the Bankrupts Act 1731 (5 Geo. 2. c. 30), as continued by the Continuance, etc., of Acts, 1735 (9 Geo. 2. c. 18) and the Bankrupts Act 1742 (16 Geo. 2. c. 27), as amended and continued by the Continuance of Laws (No. 2) Act 1750 (24 Geo. 2. c. 57) and continued by the Continuance of Laws, etc., (No. 2) Act 1757 (31 Geo. 2. c. 35), the Bankrupts, etc. Act 1763 (4 Geo. 3. c. 36), the Bankrupts Act 1772 (12 Geo. 3. c. 47), the Continuance of Laws Act 1776 (16 Geo. 3. c. 54), the Continuance of Laws Act 1781 (21 Geo. 3. c. 29) and the Continuance of Laws (No. 2) Act 1786 (26 Geo. 3. c. 80), from the expiration of the act until the end of the next session of parliament after 29 September 1793.

Section 3 of the act continued the Penitentiary Act 1779 (19 Geo. 3. c. 74) and so much of the Transportation, etc. Act 1784 (24 Geo. 3. Sess. 2. c. 56) "as extends to authorise the Removal of Offenders to temporary Places of Confinement" from the expiration of those enactments until the end of the next session of parliament after 1 June 1793.

Section 4 of the act amended the Transportation, etc. Act 1784 (24 Geo. 3. Sess. 2. c. 56), providing that offenders who were to be conveyed to temporary places of confinement under that act should be removed to temporary places of confinement during such confinement, and should be treated and visited in the same manner as offenders sentenced to hard labour under the Penitentiary Act 1779 (19 Geo. 3. c. 74), with all expenses for their maintenance or death to be defrayed by overseers appointed by the Crown in the same manner as expenses for offenders under the Penitentiary Act 1779 (19 Geo. 3. c. 74).

Section 5 of the act provided that the Crown could authorize persons to make contracts for transporting offenders, with such contracts being as valid as those made under the Transportation, etc. Act 1784 (24 Geo. 3. Sess. 2. c. 56).

== Subsequent developments ==
The Select Committee on Temporary Laws, Expired or Expiring, appointed in 1796, inspected and considered all temporary laws, observing irregularities in the construction of expiring laws continuance acts, making recommendations and emphasising the importance of the Committee for Expired and Expiring Laws.

So much of the act as related "to the imprisonment of offenders, and their removal and imprisonment in temporary places of confinement" was repealed by section 29 of the Transportation Act 1824 (5 Geo. 4. c. 84).

The whole act was repealed by section 1 of, and the schedule to, the Statute Law Revision Act 1871 (34 & 35 Vict. c. 116), which came into force on 21 August 1871.
