= Continuance of Laws (No. 2) Act 1786 =

Act of the Parliament of Great Britain

- Act of Parliament
- Parliament of Great Britain
- Long title: An Act for further continuing certain Acts therein mentioned, relating to the further Punishment of Persons going armed or disguised in Defiance of the Laws of Customs or Excise, and to the preventing the committing of Frauds by Bankrupts
- Citation: 26 Geo. 3. c. 80
- Territorial extent: Great Britain

Dates
- Royal assent: 5 July 1786
- Commencement: 24 January 1786 (Note: Start of session.)
- Repealed: 21 August 1871

Other legislation
- Amends: See § Continued enactments
- Repealed by: Statute Law Revision Act 1871
- Relates to: See Expiring laws continuance acts

Status: Repealed

Text of statute as originally enacted

The Continuance of Laws (No. 2) Act 1786 (26 Geo. 3. c. 80) was an act of the Parliament of Great Britain that continued various older acts.

== Background ==
In the United Kingdom, acts of Parliament remain in force until expressly repealed. Many acts of parliament, however, contained time-limited sunset clauses, requiring legislation to revive enactments that had expired or to continue enactments that would otherwise expire.

== Provisions ==
=== Continued enactments ===
Section 1 of the act continued the Offences against Customs or Excise Act 1745 (19 Geo. 2. c. 34) "as relates to persons going armed or disguised, in Defiance of the Laws of Customs and Excise; and to the Relief of Officers of the Customs in Informacions upon Seizures, and all the Methods, Orders, Directions, Rules, Proclamations, Penalties, Punishments, Rewards, Matters, and Things provided, settled, ordered directed, imposed, given, and required... relative to the Surrender, proclaiming, apprehending, harbouring, and punishing of such Offenders", as continued by the Continuance of Laws, etc. Act 1753 (26 Geo. 2. c. 32), the Persons Going Armed or Disguised Act 1758 (32 Geo. 2. c. 23), the Continuance of Laws (No. 2) Act 1763 (4 Geo. 3. c. 12), the Continuance of Certain Laws, etc. Act 1771 (11 Geo. 3. c. 51) and the Continuance of Laws Act 1778 (18 Geo. 3. c. 45), from the expiration of those enactments until the end of the next session of parliament after 29 September 1788.

Section 2 of the act continued the Bankrupts Act 1731 (5 Geo. 2. c. 30), as continued by the Continuance, etc., of Acts, 1735 (9 Geo. 2. c. 18) and the Bankrupts Act 1742 (16 Geo. 2. c. 27), as amended and continued by the Continuance of Laws (No. 2) Act 1750 (24 Geo. 2. c. 57) and continued by the Continuance of Laws, etc., (No. 2) Act 1757 (31 Geo. 2. c. 35), the Bankrupts, etc. Act 1763 (4 Geo. 3. c. 36), the Bankrupts Act 1772 (12 Geo. 3. c. 47), the Continuance of Laws Act 1776 (16 Geo. 3. c. 54) and the Continuance of Laws Act 1781 (21 Geo. 3. c. 29), from the expiration of the act until the end of the next session of parliament after 29 September 1788.

== Subsequent developments ==
The Select Committee on Temporary Laws, Expired or Expiring, appointed in 1796, inspected and considered all temporary laws, observing irregularities in the construction of expiring laws continuance acts, making recommendations and emphasising the importance of the Committee for Expired and Expiring Laws.

The whole act was repealed by section 1 of, and the schedule to, the Statute Law Revision Act 1871 (34 & 35 Vict. c. 116), which came into force on 21 August 1871.
