= Continuance of Laws Act 1781 =

Act of the Parliament of Great Britain

- Act of Parliament
- Parliament of Great Britain
- Long title: An Act to continue several Laws relating to the opening and establishing certain Free Ports in the Island of Jamaica; to the allowing the free Importation of Sago-Powder and Vermicelli from His Majesty's Colonies in North America; to the free Importation of certain Raw Hides and Skins from Ireland and the British Plantations in America; to the allowing the Exportation of Provisions, Goods, Wares, and Merchandize, to certain Places in North America, which are, or may be under the Protection of His Majesty's Arms, and from such Places to Great Britain, and other Parts of His Majesty's Dominions; to the clandestine running of uncustomed Goods, and preventing Frauds relating to the Customs; to the preventing the clandestine running of Goods, and the Danger of Infection thereby; to the encouraging the Growth of Coffee in His Majesty's Plantations in America; to the preventing the committing of Frauds by Bankrupts; and to revive and continue several Laws relating to allowing the Exportation of certain Quantities of Wheat, and other Articles to His Majesty's Sugar Colonies in America; to the impowering His Majesty to prohibit the Exportation, and restrain the carrying Coastwise of Copper in Bars, or Copper in Sheets; to the allowing a Drawback of the Duties on Rum shipped as Stores, to be consumed on board Merchant Ships on their Voyages; and to the allowing a Bounty on the Exportation of British Corn and Grain in Neutral Ships.
- Citation: 21 Geo. 3. c. 29
- Territorial extent: Great Britain

Dates
- Royal assent: 18 May 1781
- Commencement: 31 October 1780 (Note: Start of session.)
- Repealed: 21 August 1871

Other legislation
- Amends: See § Revived and continued enactments
- Repealed by: Statute Law Revision Act 1871
- Relates to: See Expiring laws continuance acts

Status: Repealed

Text of statute as originally enacted

The Continuance of Laws Act 1781 (21 Geo. 3. c. 29) was an act of the Parliament of Great Britain that revived and continued various older acts.

== Background ==
In the United Kingdom, acts of Parliament remain in force until expressly repealed. Many acts of parliament, however, contained time-limited sunset clauses, requiring legislation to revive enactments that had expired or to continue enactments that would otherwise expire.

== Provisions ==
=== Revived and continued enactments ===
Section 1 of the act continued the Free Ports, West Indies, etc. Act 1766 (6 Geo. 3. c. 49) "as relates to the opening and establishing certain free Ports in the Islands of Jamaica", as continued by the Free Ports (Jamaica) Act 1774 (14 Geo. 3. c. 41) from the expiration of those enactments until the end of the next session of parliament after 1 November 1787.

Section 2 of the act continued the Importation (No. 8) Act 1766 (7 Geo. 3. c. 30) "as relates to allowing the free Importation of Sago Powder and Vermicelli into this Kingdom from his Majesty's Colonies in North America" from the expiration of those enactments until the end of the next session of parliament after 1 December 1796.

Section 3 of the act continued the until the Hides and Skins Act 1769 (9 Geo. 3. c. 39) "as relates to the free importation of certain raw hides and skins from Ireland, and the British plantations in America", as continued by the Continuance of Laws, etc. Act 1774 (14 Geo. 3. c. 86), from the expiration of those enactments until the end of the next session of parliament after 1 June 1786.

Section 4 of the act continued the Exportation Act 1780 (20 Geo. 3. c. 46) from the expiration of the act until the end of the next session of parliament after 1 June 1782.

Section 5 of the act continued certain clauses of the Adulteration of Coffee Act 1718 (5 Geo. 1. c. 11), as continued by the Continuance of Laws Act 1722 (9 Geo. 1. c. 8), the Unlawful Games Act 1728 (2 Geo. 2. c. 28), the Continuance of Laws (No. 2) Act 1734 (8 Geo. 2. c. 21), the Starr and Bent Act 1741 (15 Geo. 2. c. 33), the Continuance of Laws Act 1746 (20 Geo. 2. c. 47), the Continuance of Laws etc., Act 1754 (27 Geo. 2. c. 18), the Continuance of Laws Act 1759 (33 Geo. 2. c. 16), the Continuance of Laws Act 1766 (7 Geo. 3. c. 35) and the Continuance of Laws, etc. Act 1774 (14 Geo. 3. c. 86), from the expiration of those enactments to the end of the next session of parliament after 29 September 1788.

Section 6 of the act continued the Customs, etc. Act 1721 (8 Geo. 1. c. 18) "except the Clauses obliging all Ships and Vessels to perform Quarantine", as continued by the Continuance of Laws Act 1746 (20 Geo. 2. c. 47), corrected by the Insolvent Debtors Relief, etc. Act 1747 (21 Geo. 2. c. 33) and continued by the Continuance of Laws etc., Act 1754 (27 Geo. 2. c. 18), the Continuance of Laws Act 1759 (33 Geo. 2. c. 16), the Continuance of Laws Act 1766 (7 Geo. 3. c. 35) and the Continuance of Laws, etc. Act 1774 (14 Geo. 3. c. 86), from the expiration of those enactments until the end of the next session of parliament after 29 September 1788.

Section 7 of the act continued the Growth of Coffee Act 1731 (5 Geo. 2. c. 24) "except such part thereof as relates to the importation and exportation of foreign coffee into and from the British colonies and plantations in America", as continued by the Continuance of Laws Act 1737 (11 Geo. 2. c. 18), the Growth of Coffee Act 1745 (19 Geo. 2. c. 23), the Growth of Coffee, etc. Act 1751 (25 Geo. 2. c. 35), the Continuance of Laws Act 1758 (32 Geo. 2. c. 23), the Continuance of Laws Act 1766 (6 Geo. 3. c. 44) and the Continuance of Laws, etc. Act 1774 (14 Geo. 3. c. 86), from the expiration of those enactments until the end of the next session of parliament after 24 June 1788.

Section 8 of the act continued the Bankrupts Act 1731 (5 Geo. 2. c. 30), as continued by the Continuance, etc., of Acts, 1735 (9 Geo. 2. c. 18) and the Bankrupts Act 1742 (16 Geo. 2. c. 27), as amended and continued by the Continuance of Laws (No. 2) Act 1750 (24 Geo. 2. c. 57) and continued by the Continuance of Laws, etc., (No. 2) Act 1757 (31 Geo. 2. c. 35), the Bankrupts, etc. Act 1763 (4 Geo. 3. c. 36), the Bankrupts Act 1772 (12 Geo. 3. c. 47) and the Continuance of Laws Act 1776 (16 Geo. 3. c. 54), from the expiration of the act until the end of the next session of parliament after 29 September 1785.

Section 9 of the act revived and continued the Exportation Act 1776 (16 Geo. 3. c. 37) "as relates to allowing the exportation of certain quantities of wheat, and other articles to his Majesty's sugar colonies in America", as continued by the Exportation (No. 2) Act 1776 (17 Geo. 3. c. 28), the Exportation Act 1778 (18 Geo. 3. c. 16), the Continuance of Laws Act 1779 (19 Geo. 3. c. 22) and the Continuance of Laws (No. 2) Act 1780 (20 Geo. 3. c. 19), from the passing of the act until 1 May 1782.

Section 10 of the act revived and continued the Exportations, etc. Act 1780 (20 Geo. 3. c. 59) from the passing of the act until 1 May 1782.

Section 11 of the act revived and continued the Continuance of Laws Act 1779 (19 Geo. 3. c. 22) "as relates to allowing a Drawback on the Duties of Rum shipped as Stores to be consumed on board Merchant Ships on their Voyages" from the passing of the act until 1 April 1782.

Section 12 of the act revived and continued the Bounty on Corn Act 1780 (20 Geo. 3. c. 31) from the passing of the act until 25 March 1782.

== Subsequent developments ==
The Select Committee on Temporary Laws, Expired or Expiring, appointed in 1796, inspected and considered all temporary laws, observing irregularities in the construction of expiring laws continuance acts, making recommendations and emphasising the importance of the Committee for Expired and Expiring Laws.

The whole act was repealed by section 1 of, and the schedule to, the Statute Law Revision Act 1871 (34 & 35 Vict. c. 116), which came into force on 21 August 1871.
