= Bankrupts Act 1772 =

Act of the Parliament of Great Britain

- Act of Parliament
- Parliament of Great Britain
- Long title: An Act to continue an Act, made in the Fifth Year of the Reign of His late Majesty King George the Second, intituled, "An Act to prevent the committing of Frauds by Bankrupts," and for making Provision for discharging Bankrupts, in certain Cases, from their Imprisonment.
- Citation: 12 Geo. 3. c. 47
- Territorial extent: Great Britain

Dates
- Royal assent: 3 June 1772
- Commencement: 21 January 1772 (Note: Start of session.)
- Repealed: 21 August 1871
Other legislation
| Amends | See § Continued enactments |
| Repealed by | Statute Law Revision Act 1871 |
| Relates to | Continuance, etc., of Acts, 1735; Bankrupts Act 1742; Continuance of Laws (No. 2) Act 1750; Continuance of Laws, etc., (No. 2) Act 1757; Bankrupts, etc. Act 1763; Continuance of Laws Act 1776; Continuance of Laws Act 1781; Continuance of Laws (No. 2) Act 1786 |

Status: Repealed

Text of statute as originally enacted

The Bankrupts Act 1772 (12 Geo. 3. c. 47) was an act of the Parliament of Great Britain that continued various older acts.

== Background ==
In the United Kingdom, acts of Parliament remain in force until expressly repealed. Many acts of parliament, however, contained time-limited sunset clauses, requiring legislation to revive enactments that had expired or to continue enactments that would otherwise expire.

== Provisions ==
=== Continued enactments ===
Section 1 of the act continued the Bankrupts Act 1731 (5 Geo. 2. c. 30), as revived and continued by the Continuance, etc., of Acts, 1735 (9 Geo. 2. c. 18) and as continued by the Continuance of Laws (No. 2) Act 1750 (24 Geo. 2. c. 57), the Continuance of Laws, etc., (No. 2) Act 1757 (31 Geo. 2. c. 35) and the Bankrupts, etc. Act 1763 (4 Geo. 3. c. 36), from the expiration of the act until the end of the next session of parliament after 29 September 1771.

Section 2 of the act provided that all persons against whom a commission of bankruptcy had been issued should be confined in prison until they delivered up their effects, but that those who were in custody before 25 March 25 for debts incurred prior to their bankruptcy commission should be discharged if they had conformed to the bankruptcy laws, and furthermore that such discharged bankrupts could not be re-arrested for pre-commission debts, with sheriffs and other officers being indemnified for refusing to make such arrests.

Section 3 of the act provided that bankrupts against whom a commission had been awarded before March 25, 1772, who had absconded or gone abroad from fear of long imprisonment (to the distress of their families and detriment of the kingdom), could be discharged from arrest for pre-commission debts if they had regularly submitted to the commissioners and conformed to bankruptcy statutes, by petitioning any judge after forty days of arrest, whereupon the judge could immediately discharge them upon proper summons, subject to all other bankruptcy law requirements.

== Subsequent developments ==
The Bankrupts Act 1731 (5 Geo. 2. c. 30) was further continued from the expiration of the act until the end of the next session of parliament after 1 September 1780 by section 1 Continuance of Laws Act 1776 (16 Geo. 3. c. 54).

The Bankrupts Act 1731 (5 Geo. 2. c. 30) was further continued from the expiration of the act until the end of the next session of parliament after 29 September 1785 by section 1 of the Continuance of Laws Act 1781 (21 Geo. 3. c. 29).

The Bankrupts Act 1731 (5 Geo. 2. c. 30) was further continued from the expiration of the act until the end of the next session of parliament after 29 September 1788 by section 2 of the Continuance of Laws (No. 2) Act 1786 (26 Geo. 3. c. 80).

The Bankrupts Act 1731 (5 Geo. 2. c. 30) was further continued from the expiration of the act until the end of the next session of parliament after 29 September 1793 by section 2 of the Continuance of Laws (No. 2) Act 1788 (28 Geo. 3. c. 24).

The Select Committee on Temporary Laws, Expired or Expiring, appointed in 1796, inspected and considered all the temporary laws, observed irregularities in the construction of expiring laws continuance acts, making recommendations and emphasising the importance of the Committee for Expired and Expiring Laws.

The whole act was repealed by section 1 of, and the schedule to, the Statute Law Revision Act 1871 (34 & 35 Vict. c. 116), which came into force on 21 August 1871.
