= Bankrupts, etc. Act 1763 =

Act of the Parliament of Great Britain

- Act of Parliament
- Parliament of Great Britain
- Long title: An Act to continue an Act made in the Fifth Year of the Reign of His late Majesty King George the Second, intituled, "An Act to prevent the committing of Frauds by Bankrupts;" and for extending the Laws relating to Hackney Coaches to the Counties of Kent and Essex.
- Citation: 4 Geo. 3. c. 36
- Territorial extent: Great Britain

Dates
- Royal assent: 19 April 1764
- Commencement: (Note: Start of session.)
- Repealed: 21 August 1871
Other legislation
Amends	Bankrupts Act 1731
Amended by	London Hackney Carriage Act 1831
Repealed by	Statute Law Revision Act 1871
Relates to	Continuance, etc., of Acts, 1735; Bankrupts Act 1742; Continuance of Laws (No. 2) Act 1750; Continuance of Laws, etc., (No. 2) Act 1757; Bankrupts Act 1772; Continuance of Laws Act 1776; Continuance of Laws Act 1781; Continuance of Laws (No. 2) Act 1786

Status: Repealed

Text of statute as originally enacted

The Bankrupts, etc. Act 1763 (4 Geo. 3. c. 36) was an act of the Parliament of Great Britain that continued various older acts.

== Background ==
In the United Kingdom, acts of Parliament remain in force until expressly repealed. Many acts of parliament, however, contained time-limited sunset clauses, requiring legislation to revive enactments that had expired or to continue enactments that would otherwise expire.

== Provisions ==
=== Continued enactments ===
Section 1 of the act continued the Bankrupts Act 1731 (5 Geo. 2. c. 30), as revived and continued by the Continuance, etc., of Acts, 1735 (9 Geo. 2. c. 18) and as continued by the Continuance of Laws (No. 2) Act 1750 (24 Geo. 2. c. 57) and the Continuance of Laws, etc., (No. 2) Act 1757 (31 Geo. 2. c. 35), from the expiration of the act until the end of the next session of parliament after 29 September 1771.

Section 2 of the act authorised justices of the peace for the counties of Kent and Essex to put the laws relating to hackney coaches into execution within their respective jurisdictions.

== Subsequent developments ==
The Bankrupts Act 1731 (5 Geo. 2. c. 30) was further continued from the expiration of the act until the end of the next session of parliament after 1 September 1775 by section 1 of the Bankrupts Act 1772 (12 Geo. 3. c. 47).

The Bankrupts Act 1731 (5 Geo. 2. c. 30) was further continued from the expiration of the act until the end of the next session of parliament after 1 September 1780 by section 1 of the Continuance of Laws Act 1776 (16 Geo. 3. c. 54).

The Bankrupts Act 1731 (5 Geo. 2. c. 30) was further continued from the expiration of the act until the end of the next session of parliament after 29 September 1785 by section 1 of the Continuance of Laws Act 1781 (21 Geo. 3. c. 29).

The Bankrupts Act 1731 (5 Geo. 2. c. 30) was further continued from the expiration of the act until the end of the next session of parliament after 29 September 1788 by section 2 of the Continuance of Laws (No. 2) Act 1786 (26 Geo. 3. c. 80).

The Bankrupts Act 1731 (5 Geo. 2. c. 30) was further continued from the expiration of the act until the end of the next session of parliament after 29 September 1793 by section 2 of the Continuance of Laws (No. 2) Act 1788 (28 Geo. 3. c. 24).

The Select Committee on Temporary Laws, Expired or Expiring, appointed in 1796, inspected and considered all the temporary laws, observed irregularities in the construction of expiring laws continuance acts, making recommendations and emphasising the importance of the Committee for Expired and Expiring Laws.

So much of the act "as in any Manner relates to such last-mentioned Purpose" was repealed by section 1 of the London Hackney Carriage Act 1831 (55 Geo. 3. c. 159), which came into force on 5 January 1832.

The whole act was repealed by section 1 of, and the schedule to, the Statute Law Revision Act 1871 (34 & 35 Vict. c. 116), which came into force on 21 August 1871.
