= Continuance of Laws Act 1776 =

Act of the Parliament of Great Britain

- Act of Parliament
- Parliament of Great Britain
- Long title: An Act to continue an Act, made in the Fifth Year of the Reign of His late Majesty King George the Second, intituled, "An Act to prevent the committing of Frauds by Bankrupts;" and also an Act, made in the Fourteenth Year of the Reign of His present Majesty, intituled, "An Act to prohibit the Importation of light Silver Coin of this Realm from Foreign Countries into Great Britain or Ireland, and to restrain the Tender thereof beyond a certain Sum."
- Citation: 16 Geo. 3. c. 54
- Territorial extent: Great Britain

Dates
- Royal assent: 21 May 1776
- Commencement: 26 October 1775 (Note: Start of session.)
- Repealed: 21 August 1871

Other legislation
- Amends: See § Continued enactments
- Repealed by: Statute Law Revision Act 1871
- Relates to: See Expiring laws continuance acts

Status: Repealed

Text of statute as originally enacted

The Continuance of Laws Act 1776 (16 Geo. 3. c. 54) was an act of the Parliament of Great Britain that continued various older acts.

== Background ==
In the United Kingdom, acts of Parliament remain in force until expressly repealed. Many acts of parliament, however, contained time-limited sunset clauses, requiring legislation to revive enactments that had expired or to continue enactments that would otherwise expire.

== Provisions ==
=== Continued enactments ===
Section 1 of the act continued the Bankrupts Act 1731 (5 Geo. 2. c. 30), as continued by the Continuance, etc., of Acts, 1735 (9 Geo. 2. c. 18) and the Bankrupts Act 1742 (16 Geo. 2. c. 27), as amended and continued by the Continuance of Laws (No. 2) Act 1750 (24 Geo. 2. c. 57) and continued by the Continuance of Laws, etc., (No. 2) Act 1757 (31 Geo. 2. c. 35), the Bankrupts, etc. Act 1763 (4 Geo. 3. c. 36) and the Bankrupts Act 1772 (12 Geo. 3. c. 47), from the expiration of the act until the end of the next session of parliament after 29 September 1780.

Section 2 of the act continued the from the expiration of the act until the Light Silver Coin Act 1774 (14 Geo. 3. c. 42) from the expiration of the act until the end of the next session of parliament after 1 May 1778.

== Subsequent developments ==
The Select Committee on Temporary Laws, Expired or Expiring, appointed in 1796, inspected and considered all temporary laws, observing irregularities in the construction of expiring laws continuance acts, making recommendations and emphasising the importance of the Committee for Expired and Expiring Laws.

The whole act was repealed by section 1 of, and the schedule to, the Statute Law Revision Act 1871 (34 & 35 Vict. c. 116), which came into force on 21 August 1871.
