= Bankrupts Act 1742 =

Act of the Parliament of Great Britain

- Act of Parliament
- Parliament of Great Britain
- Long title: An Act to continue an Act, made in the Fifth Year of the Reign of His present Majesty, intituled, "An Act to prevent the committing of Frauds by Bankrupts."
- Citation: 16 Geo. 2. c. 27
- Territorial extent: Great Britain

Dates
- Royal assent: 21 April 1743
- Commencement: 21 April 1743 (Note: Start of session.)
- Repealed: 15 July 1867
Other legislation
Amends	Bankrupts Act 1731
Repealed by	Statute Law Revision Act 1871
Relates to	Continuance, etc., of Acts, 1735; Continuance of Laws (No. 2) Act 1750; Continuance of Laws, etc., (No. 2) Act 1757; Bankrupts, etc. Act 1763; Bankrupts Act 1772; Continuance of Laws Act 1776; Continuance of Laws Act 1781; Continuance of Laws (No. 2) Act 1786

Status: Repealed

Text of statute as originally enacted

The Bankrupts Act 1742 (16 Geo. 2. c. 27) was an act of the Parliament of Great Britain that continued various older acts.

== Background ==
In the United Kingdom, acts of Parliament remain in force until expressly repealed. Many acts of parliament, however, contained time-limited sunset clauses, requiring legislation to revive enactments that had expired or to continue enactments that would otherwise expire.

== Provisions ==
=== Continued enactments ===
Section 1 of the act continued the Bankrupts Act 1731 (5 Geo. 2. c. 30), as revived and continued by the Continuance, etc., of Acts, 1735 (9 Geo. 2. c. 18), from the expiration of the act until the end of the next session of parliament after 29 September 1750.

== Subsequent developments ==
The Bankrupts Act 1731 (5 Geo. 2. c. 30) was further continued from the expiration of the act until the end of the next session of parliament after 1 September 1757 by section 8 of the Continuance of Laws (No. 2) Act 1750 (24 Geo. 2. c. 57).

The Bankrupts Act 1731 (5 Geo. 2. c. 30) was further continued from the expiration of the act until the end of the next session of parliament after 29 September 1764 by section 2 of the Continuance of Laws, etc., (No. 2) Act 1757 (31 Geo. 2. c. 35).

The Bankrupts Act 1731 (5 Geo. 2. c. 30) was further continued from the expiration of the act until the end of the next session of parliament after 29 September 1771 by section 1 of the Bankrupts, etc. Act 1763 (31 Geo. 2. c. 35).

The Bankrupts Act 1731 (5 Geo. 2. c. 30) was further continued from the expiration of the act until the end of the next session of parliament after 29 September 1775 by section 1 of the Bankrupts Act 1772 (12 Geo. 3. c. 47).

The Bankrupts Act 1731 (5 Geo. 2. c. 30) was further continued from the expiration of the act until the end of the next session of parliament after 29 September 1780 by section 1 of the Continuance of Laws Act 1776 (16 Geo. 3. c. 54).

The Bankrupts Act 1731 (5 Geo. 2. c. 30) was further continued from the expiration of the act until the end of the next session of parliament after 29 September 1785 by section 1 of the Continuance of Laws Act 1781 (21 Geo. 3. c. 29).

The Bankrupts Act 1731 (5 Geo. 2. c. 30) was further continued from the expiration of the act until the end of the next session of parliament after 29 September 1788 by section 2 of the Continuance of Laws (No. 2) Act 1786 (26 Geo. 3. c. 80).

The Bankrupts Act 1731 (5 Geo. 2. c. 30) was further continued from the expiration of the act until the end of the next session of parliament after 29 September 1793 by section 2 of the Continuance of Laws (No. 2) Act 1788 (28 Geo. 3. c. 24).

The Select Committee on Temporary Laws, Expired or Expiring, appointed in 1796, inspected and considered all the temporary laws, observed irregularities in the construction of expiring laws continuance acts, making recommendations and emphasising the importance of the Committee for Expired and Expiring Laws.

The whole act was repealed by section 1 of, and the schedule to, the Statute Law Revision Act 1867 (30 & 31 Vict. c. 59), which came into force on 15 July 1867.
