= Perjury Act 1728 =

Act of the Parliament of Great Britain

Perjury Act 1728 (Note: The citation of this act by this short title was authorised by section 1 of, and the first schedule to, the Short Titles Act 1896. Due to the repeal of those provisions it is now authorised by section 19(2) of the Interpretation Act 1978.)
- Act of Parliament
- Parliament of Great Britain
- Long title: An Act for the more effectual preventing and further Punishment of Forgery, Perjury and Subornation of Perjury; and to make it Felony to steal Bonds, Notes or other Securities for Payment of Money.
- Citation: 2 Geo. 2. c. 25
- Territorial extent: England and Wales (Note: Section 4.)

Dates
- Royal assent: 14 May 1729
- Commencement: 29 June 1729 (Note: Section 1.)
- Repealed: 1 January 1912
Other legislation
Amended by	Continuance, etc., of Acts, 1735; Statute Law Revision Act 1867; Statute Law Revision Act 1871
Repealed by	Perjury Act 1911

Status: Repealed

Text of statute as originally enacted

The Perjury Act 1728 (2 Geo. 2. c. 25) was an act of the Parliament of Great Britain.

== Provisions ==
=== Section 2 - Penalty for perjury and subornation of perjury ===
The act applied only to perjury in judicial proceedings. Section 2 provided that perjury and subornation of perjury were punishable with imprisonment for a term not exceeding seven years.

William Oldnall Russell said section 2 was the important statute relating to the punishment of perjury.

Castro v R was decided under section 2.

=== Section 6 ===
Section 6 provided for the act to expire.

== Subsequent developments ==
The whole act was revived and made perpetual by the Continuance, etc., of Acts, 1735 (9 Geo. 2. c. 18), which came into force on 15 January 1736.

So much of the act as related to the stealing or taking by robbery any orders or other securities therein enumerated was repealed by section 1 of the Criminal Statutes Repeal Act 1827 (7 & 8 Geo. 4. c. 27). (Note: The marginal note says that the effect of this was to repeal section 3 of this act.)

The whole act, except so far as it related to perjury and subornation of perjury, was repealed by section 31 of the Forgery Act 1830 (11 Geo. 4 & 1 Will. 4. c. 66). (Note: The marginal note says the whole act was repealed except section 2.)

Section 6 of the act was repealed by section 1 of, and the schedule to, the Statute Law Revision Act 1867 (30 & 31 Vict. c. 59), which came into force on 15 July 1867.

Section 5 of the act was repealed by section 1 of, and the schedule to, the Statute Law Revision Act 1871 (34 & 35 Vict. c. 116), which came into force on 21 August 1871.

The whole act was repealed by section 19 of, and the schedule to, the Perjury Act 1911 (1 & 2 Geo. 5. c. 6) which came into force on 1 January 1912.

== Bibliography ==
- John Rayner. "2 Geo II Chap 25". Readings on Statutes. London. 1775. Pages 169 to 207.
- J M Lely. The Statutes of Practical Utility. (Chitty's Statutes). Fifth Edition. 1894. Volume 3. Page 371.
- "The Punishment of Perjury" (1890) 25 The Law Journal 250 (26 April 1890)
- W Oldnall Russell, Horace Smith and A P Perceval Keep. A Treatise on Crimes and Misdemeanors. Sixth Edition. 1896. Volume 1. pp 322, 323 & 397.
- The Law of Forgery. J. & W. T. Clarke. 1831. pp 10, 25, 31, 62, 112 & 124.
