= HALT Act =

The HALT Act may refer to:

- The Humane Alternatives to Long-Term (HALT) Solitary Confinement Act, a 2021 New York state law: see Solitary confinement in the United States § New York
- The HALT Fentanyl Act, a proposed 2023 US federal law

== See also ==
- Hat Act
