= Continuance of Laws, etc., (No. 2) Act 1757 =

Act of the Parliament of Great Britain

- Act of Parliament
- Parliament of Great Britain
- Long title: An Act to continue several Laws therein mentioned, for granting a Liberty to carry Sugars of the Growth, Produce, or Manufacture, of any of His Majesty's Sugar Colonies in America, from the said Colonies directly into Foreign Parts, in Ships built in Great Britain, and navigated according to Law; for the preventing the committing of Frauds by Bankrupts; for giving further Encouragement for the Importation of Naval Stores from the British Colonies in America; and for preventing Frauds and Abuses in the Admeasurement of Coals in the City and Liberty of Westminster; and for preventing the stealing or destroying of Madder Roots.
- Citation: 31 Geo. 2. c. 35
- Territorial extent: Great Britain

Dates
- Royal assent: 20 June 1758
- Commencement: 1 December 1757 (Note: Start of session.)
- Repealed: 15 July 1867
Other legislation
Amends	See § Continued enactments
Repealed by	Statute Law Revision Act 1867
Relates to	See Expiring laws continuance acts

Status: Repealed

Text of statute as originally enacted

The Continuance of Laws, etc., (No. 2) Act 1757 (31 Geo. 2. c. 35) was an act of the Parliament of Great Britain that continued various older enactments.

== Background ==
In the United Kingdom, acts of Parliament remain in force until expressly repealed. Many acts of parliament, however, contained time-limited sunset clauses, requiring legislation to revive enactments that had expired or to continue enactments that would otherwise expire.

== Provisions ==
=== Continued enactments ===
Section 1 of the act continued the Colonial Trade Act 1738 (12 Geo. 2. c. 30), as continued by the Universities (Wine Licences) Act 1743 (17 Geo. 2. c. 40) and the Continuance of Laws (No.2) Act 1750 (24 Geo. 2. c. 57), from the expiration of the act until the end of the next session of parliament after 1 September 1764.

Section 2 of the act continued the Bankrupts Act 1731 (5 Geo. 2. c. 30), as continued by the Continuance, etc., of Acts, 1735 (9 Geo. 2. c. 18) and the Bankrupts Act 1742 (16 Geo. 2. c. 27), from the expiration of the act until the end of the next session of parliament after 29 September 1764.

Section 3 of the act continued the Importation Act 1721 (8 Geo. 1. c. 12) "as relates to the importation of wood and timber, and of the goods commonly known as Lumber, therein particularly enumerated, from any of His Majesty's British plantations or colonies in America, free from all customs and impositions whatsoever", as continued by the Continuance of Laws, etc. Act 1742 (16 Geo. 2. c. 26) and the Continuance of Laws Act 1750 (24 Geo. 2. c. 52), from the expiration of the act until the end of the next session of parliament after 29 September 1764.

Section 4 of the act continued the Coal Trade (London) Act 1745 (19 Geo. 2. c. 35), as continued by the Continuance of Laws, etc. Act 1749 (23 Geo. 2. c. 26) and the Continuance of Laws (No.2) Act 1750 (24 Geo. 2. c. 57), from the expiration of the act until the end of the next session of parliament after 24 June 1759.

Section 5 of the act provided that persons convicted of stealing, pulling up, or destroying madder roots growing in any lands or grounds shall either confess before justices of the peace or be convicted by oath of witnesses, and upon conviction shall give satisfaction to the owner for damages and pay a fine not exceeding ten shillings to the overseers of the poor, with provisions for monthly payments and imprisonment in the house of correction for up to one month for non-payment.

Section 6 of the act provided that no person could be prosecuted for such an offence unless begun within 30 days after the offence.

== Subsequent developments ==
The Select Committee on Temporary Laws, Expired or Expiring, appointed in 1796, inspected and considered all temporary laws, observing irregularities in the construction of expiring laws continuance acts, making recommendations and emphasising the importance of the Committee for Expired and Expiring Laws.

The whole act was repealed by section 1 of, and the schedule to, the Statute Law Revision Act 1867 (30 & 31 Vict. c. 59), which came into force on 15 July 1867.
