= Hat Act 1731 =

Act of the Parliament of Great Britain

- Act of Parliament
- Parliament of Great Britain
- Long title: An Act to prevent the Exportation of Hats out of any of His Majesty's Colonies, or Plantations in America, and to restrain the Number of Apprentices taken by Hatmakers in the said Colonies or Plantations, and for the better encouraging the making Hats in Great Britain.
- Citation: 5 Geo. 2. c. 22
- Territorial extent: Great Britain; British America and the British West Indies

Dates
- Royal assent: 1 June 1732
- Commencement: 30 September 1732 (Note: Section 1)
- Repealed: 15 July 1867
Other legislation
Amended by	Customs Law Repeal Act 1825
Repealed by	Statute Law Revision Act 1867

Status: Repealed

Text of statute as originally enacted

The Hat Act 1731 (5 Geo. 2. c. 22) was an act of the Parliament of Great Britain enacted in 1732 to prevent and control hat production by the colonists in British America.

It specifically placed limits on the manufacture, sale, and exportation of colonial-made hats. The act also restricted hiring practices by limiting the number of workers that hatmakers could employ, and placing limits on apprenticeships by only allowing two apprentices. The act was one of several legislative measures introduced by the British Parliament, seeking to restrict colonial manufactures, particularly in North American areas with available raw materials, and protect British manufactures from colonial competition.

The act's effect was that Americans in the colonies were forced to buy British-made goods, and this artificial trade restraint meant that Americans paid four times as much for hats and cloth imported from Britain than for local goods.

The whole act was repealed by the Statute Law Revision Act 1867 (30 & 31 Vict. c. 59).

In his A Summary View of the Rights of British America, Thomas Jefferson denounced the act as "an instance of despotism to which no parallel can be produced in the most arbitrary ages of British history".
