= Continuance of Laws (No. 2) Act 1750 =

Act of the Parliament of Great Britain

- Act of Parliament
- Parliament of Great Britain
- Long title: An Act to continue several Laws therein mentioned, for preventing Theft and Rapine on the Northern Borders of England, for the more effectual punishing wicked and evil-disposed Persons going armed in Disguise, and doing Injuries and Violences to the Persons and Properties of His Majesty's Subjects, and for the more speedy bringing the Offenders to Justice, for continuing Two Clauses, to prevent the cutting or breaking down the Bank of any River or Sea Bank, and to prevent the malicious cutting of Hop-binds, for the more effectual Punishment of Persons maliciously setting on Fire any Mine, Pit, or Delph, of Coal or Cannel Coal, and of Persons unlawfully hunting or taking any Red or Fallow Deer in Forests or Chases, or beating or wounding the Keepers or other Officers in Forests, Chases, or Parks, for granting a Liberty to carry Sugars, of the Growth, Produce, or Manufacture, of any of His Majesty's Sugar Colonies in America, from the said Colonies directly into Foreign Parts, in Ships built in Great Britain, and navigated according to Law, for preventing the committing of Frauds by Bankrupts, for giving further Encouragement for the Importation of Naval Stores from the British Colonies in America, and for preventing Frauds and Abuses in the Admeasurement of Coals, in the City and Liberty of Westminster, and to make some further Provisions in relation to the signing of Certificates for the Discharge of Bankrupts.
- Citation: 24 Geo. 2. c. 57
- Territorial extent: Great Britain

Dates
- Royal assent: 25 June 1751
- Commencement: 17 January 1751 (Note: Start of session.)
- Repealed: 15 July 1867
Other legislation
Amends	See § Continued enactments
Repealed by	Statute Law Revision Act 1867
Relates to	See Expiring laws continuance acts

Status: Repealed

Text of statute as originally enacted

The Continuance of Laws (No. 2) Act 1750 (24 Geo. 2. c. 57) was an act of the Parliament of Great Britain that continued various older acts.

== Background ==
In the United Kingdom, acts of Parliament remain in force until expressly repealed. Many acts of parliament, however, contained time-limited sunset clauses, requiring legislation to revive enactments that had expired or to continue enactments that would otherwise expire.

== Provisions ==
=== Continued enactments ===
Section 1 of the act continued the Moss Troopers Act 1662 (14 Cha. 2. c. 22) (Note: This is the chapter in The Statutes of the Realm.), as continued by the Perpetuation of Various Laws Act 1732 (6 Geo. 2. c. 37) and the Universities (Wine Licences) Act 1743 (17 Geo. 2. c. 40), from the expiration of the act until the end of the next session of parliament after 1 September 1757.

Section 2 of the act continued the Criminal Law Act 1722 (9 Geo. 1. c. 22), as continued by the Continuance of 9 Geo. 1. c. 22 Act 1725 (12 Geo. 1. c. 30), the Perpetuation of Various Laws Act 1732 (6 Geo. 2. c. 37), the Offences Against Persons and Property Act 1736 (10 Geo. 2. c. 32) and the Universities (Wine Licences) Act 1743 (17 Geo. 2. c. 40), from the expiration of the act until the end of the next session of parliament after 1 September 1757.

Section 3 of the act continued section 5 of the Perpetuation of Various Laws Act 1732 (6 Geo. 2. c. 37) "to prevent the cutting or breaking down the bank of any river or sea bank", as continued by the Offences Against Persons and Property Act 1736 (10 Geo. 2. c. 32) and the Universities (Wine Licences) Act 1743 (17 Geo. 2. c. 40), from the expiration of the act until the end of the next session of parliament after 1 September 1757.

Section 4 of the act continued section 6 of the Perpetuation of Various Laws Act 1732 (6 Geo. 2. c. 37) "to prevent the malicious cutting of hop-binds growing on poles in any plantation of hops", as continued by the Offences Against Persons and Property Act 1736 (10 Geo. 2. c. 32) and the Universities (Wine Licences) Act 1743 (17 Geo. 2. c. 40), from the expiration of that enactment until the end of the next session of parliament after 1 September 1757.

Section 5 of the act continued section 4 of the Universities (Wine Licences) Act 1743 (17 Geo. 2. c. 40) "for the more speedy and easy bringing the offenders against the said act to justice, and the persons who shall conceal, aid, abet or succour such offenders; and for making satisfaction and amends to all and every the person and persons, their executors and administrators, for the damages they shall have sustained or suffered by any offender or offenders against the said act; and for the encouragement of persons to apprehend and secure such offender and offenders; and for the better and more impartial trial of any indictment or information which shall be found commenced or prosecuted for any of the offences committed against the said act, together with all restrictions, limitations and infringements by the said act directed, to all cases of offences committed by unlawfully and maliciously breaking down or cutting down the bank or banks of any river, or any sea bank, whereby any lands shall be overflowed or damaged; or by unlawfully and maliciously cutting any hop-binds growing on poles in any plantation of hops; or by wilfully and maliciously setting on fire, or causing to be set on fire, any mines, pit, or delph of coal, or cannel coal" from the expiration of that enactment until the end of the next session of parliament after 1 September 1757.

Section 6 of the act continued so much of the Offences Against Persons and Property Act 1736 (10 Geo. 2. c. 32) "for the more effectual punishment of persons maliciously setting on fire any mine, pit or delph of coal, or cannel coal, or unlawfully hunting or taking any red or fallow deer in forests or chaces, or beating or wounding the keepers, or other officers, in forests, chaces or parks", as continued by the Universities (Wine Licences) Act 1743 (17 Geo. 2. c. 40), from the expiration of those enactments until the end of the next session of parliament after 1 September 1757.

Section 7 of the act continued the Colonial Trade Act 1738 (12 Geo. 2. c. 30), as continued by the Universities (Wine Licences) Act 1743 (17 Geo. 2. c. 40), from the expiration of the act until the end of the next session of parliament after 1 September 1757.

Section 8 of the act continued the Bankrupts Act 1731 (5 Geo. 2. c. 30), as continued by the Continuance, etc., of Acts, 1735 (9 Geo. 2. c. 18) and the Bankrupts Act 1742 (16 Geo. 2. c. 27), from the expiration of the act until the end of the next session of parliament after 1 September 1757.

Section 9 of the act provided that anyone fraudulently swearing or affirming a false debt owed by a bankrupt, in order to support a discharge certificate, would render that certificate null and void unless the bankrupt disclosed the fraud before the certificate was signed by the majority of commissioners.

Section 10 of the act provided that a letter of attorney from a creditor residing abroad, attested by a notary public in the usual form, would be sufficient evidence of authority to sign a bankrupt's certificate, regardless of any provisions in the Bankrupts Act 1731 (5 Geo. 2. c. 30).

Section 11 of the act continued the Importation Act 1721 (8 Geo. 1. c. 12) "as relates to the importation of wood and timber, and of the goods commonly known as Lumber, therein enumerated, from any of His Majesty's British plantations or colonies in America, in the manner therein mentioned, from all customs and impositions whatsoever granted to His Majesty, his heirs, or successors", as continued by the Continuance of Laws, etc. Act 1742 (16 Geo. 2. c. 26), from the expiration of the act until the end of the next session of parliament after 1 September 1757.

Section 12 of the act continued the Coal Trade (London) Act 1745 (19 Geo. 2. c. 35), as continued by the Continuance of Laws, etc. Act 1749 (23 Geo. 2. c. 26), from the expiration of the act until the end of the next session of parliament after 1 September 1757.

== Subsequent developments ==
The Select Committee on Temporary Laws, Expired or Expiring, appointed in 1796, inspected and considered all temporary laws, observing irregularities in the construction of expiring laws continuance acts, making recommendations and emphasising the importance of the Committee for Expired and Expiring Laws.

The whole act was repealed by section 1 of, and the schedule to, the Statute Law Revision Act 1867 (30 & 31 Vict. c. 59), which came into force on 15 July 1867.
