= List of acts of the Parliament of Great Britain from 1742 =

This is a complete list of acts of the Parliament of Great Britain for the year 1742.

For acts passed until 1707, see the list of acts of the Parliament of England and the list of acts of the Parliament of Scotland. See also the list of acts of the Parliament of Ireland.

For acts passed from 1801 onwards, see the list of acts of the Parliament of the United Kingdom. For acts of the devolved parliaments and assemblies in the United Kingdom, see the list of acts of the Scottish Parliament, the list of acts of the Northern Ireland Assembly, and the list of acts and measures of Senedd Cymru; see also the list of acts of the Parliament of Northern Ireland.

The number shown after each act's title is its chapter number. Acts are cited using this number, preceded by the year(s) of the reign during which the relevant parliamentary session was held; thus the Union with Ireland Act 1800 is cited as "39 & 40 Geo. 3. c. 67", meaning the 67th act passed during the session that started in the 39th year of the reign of George III and which finished in the 40th year of that reign. Note that the modern convention is to use Arabic numerals in citations (thus "41 Geo. 3" rather than "41 Geo. III"). Acts of the last session of the Parliament of Great Britain and the first session of the Parliament of the United Kingdom are both cited as "41 Geo. 3".

Acts passed by the Parliament of Great Britain did not have a short title; however, some of these acts have subsequently been given a short title by acts of the Parliament of the United Kingdom (such as the Short Titles Act 1896).

Before the Acts of Parliament (Commencement) Act 1793 came into force on 8 April 1793, acts passed by the Parliament of Great Britain were deemed to have come into effect on the first day of the session in which they were passed. Because of this, the years given in the list below may in fact be the year before a particular act was passed.

== 16 Geo. 2 ==
The second session of the 9th Parliament of Great Britain, which met from 16 November 1742 until 21 April 1743.

This session was also traditionally cited as 16 G. 2.

=== Public acts ===
Short title	Citation	Royal assent
Long title
Land Tax Act 1742 (repealed)	16 Geo. 2. c. 1	21 December 1742
An Act for granting an Aid to his Majesty by a Land Tax to be raised in Great Britain, for the Service of the Year one thousand seven hundred and forty-three. (Repealed by Statute Law Revision Act 1867 (30 & 31 Vict. c. 59))
Taxation Act 1742 (repealed)	16 Geo. 2. c. 2	21 December 1742
An Act for continuing the Duties upon Malt, Mum, Cyder and Perry, in that Part of Great Britain called England; and for granting to his Majesty certain Duties upon Malt, Mum, Cyder and Perry, in that Part of Great Britain called Scotland, for the Service of the Year one thousand seven hundred and forty-three. (Repealed by Statute Law Revision Act 1867 (30 & 31 Vict. c. 59))
Westmorland Roads Act 1742 (repealed)	16 Geo. 2. c. 3	22 March 1743
An Act for repairing the Road from Bowes, in the County of York, to Brough under Stainmore, in the County of Westmorland. (Repealed by Roads from Bowes and from Maiden Castle Act 1813 (53 Geo. 3. c. clxxxvii) and Annual Turnpike Acts Continuance Act 1867 (30 & 31 Vict. c. 121))
Hockliffe, Woburn and Newport Pagnell Roads Act 1742 (repealed)	16 Geo. 2. c. 4	22 March 1743
An Act for enlarging the Term and Powers granted by an Act passed in the First Year of the Reign of his present Majesty, (Note: Hockliffe, Woburn and Newport Pagnell Roads Act 1727 (1 Geo. 2. St. 2. c. 10)) for the more effectual amending the Highway between Hockliffe and Woburn, in the County of Bedford; and for repairing the Road leading through Woburn to Tickford Bridge, in Newport Pagnel, in the County of Bucks. (Repealed by Hockliffe, Woburn and Newport Pagnell Roads Act 1821 (1 & 2 Geo. 4. c. lxxxv))
Warminster Roads Act 1742 (repealed)	16 Geo. 2. c. 5	22 March 1743
An Act for enlarging the Term and Powers granted by an Act passed in the thirteenth Year of the Reign of his late Majesty King George the First, intituled, "An Act for repairing the several Roads leading from the Town of Warminster in the County of Wilts." (Note: Warminster Roads Act 1726 (13 Geo. 1. c. 16)) (Repealed by Warminster Roads Act 1815 (55 Geo. 3. c. lxxxvii))
Charterhouse Square (Rates) Act 1742 (repealed)	16 Geo. 2. c. 6	22 March 1743
An Act to enable the present and future Proprietors and Inhabitants of the Houses in Charterhouse Square, in the County of Middlesex, to make a Rate for raising Money effectually to inclose, pave, watch, clean and improve the said Square, and to continue the same in Repair. (Repealed by Statute Law (Repeals) Act 2013 (c. 2))
Boroughbridge, Catterick and Piersebridge Road Act 1742 (repealed)	16 Geo. 2. c. 7	22 March 1743
An Act for repairing the High Road from Borough Bridge, in the County of York, to Catherick, in the same County, and from thence to Piers Bridge, on the River Tees. (Repealed by Boroughbridge, Catterick and Piersbridge Road Act 1825 (6 Geo. 4. c. ix))
Spirits Act 1742 or the Gin Act 1743 (repealed)	16 Geo. 2. c. 8	22 March 1743
An Act for repealing certain Duties on Spirituous Liquors, and on Licences for retailing the same; and for laying other Duties on Spirituous Liquors, and on Licences to retail the said Liquors. (Repealed by Statute Law Revision Act 1867 (30 & 31 Vict. c. 59) and Statute Law Revision Act 1948 (11 & 12 Geo. 6. c. 62))
Saint Botolph, Aldgate (Poor Relief) Act 1742 (repealed)	16 Geo. 2. c. 9	22 March 1743
An Act to enable the Parishioners of the Parish of Saint Botolph without Aldgate, in the City of London, to raise a certain Sum of Money, for Payment of Debts already contracted for the Relief and Maintenance of the Poor of the said Parish. (Repealed by Statute Law (Repeals) Act 2013 (c. 2))
Wiltshire Roads Act 1742 (repealed)	16 Geo. 2. c. 10	22 March 1743
An Act for repairing the Roads leading from Marlborough through West-Kennet to Shepherds Shard; and from the Hare and Hounds in Beckhampton, to the Top of Cherill Hill; and from the Town of Avebury to the Cross-way at Beckhampton, in the County of Wilts. (Repealed by Wiltshire Roads Act 1790 (30 Geo. 3. c. 96))
Parliamentary Elections Act 1742 (repealed)	16 Geo. 2. c. 11	22 March 1743
An Act to explain and amend the Laws touching the Elections of Members to serve for the Commons in Parliament, for that Part of Great Britain called Scotland; and to restrain the Partiality, and regulate the Conduct of Returning Officers at such Elections. (Repealed by Statute Law Revision Act 1867 (30 & 31 Vict. c. 59))
National Debt Act 1742 (repealed)	16 Geo. 2. c. 12	22 March 1743
An Act for repealing the several Rates and Duties upon Victuallers and Retailers of Beer and Ale, within the Cities of London and Westminster, and the Weekly Bills of Mortality; and for transferring the Exchequer Bills unsatisfied thereupon to the Duties for Licences to sell Spirituous Liquors and Strong Waters by Retail; and also for enabling His Majesty to raise a certain Sum of Money, for the Service of the Year One Thousand Seven Hundred and Forty-three, to be further charged on the said Duties for Licences. (Repealed by Statute Law Revision Act 1870 (33 & 34 Vict. c. 69))
National Debt (No. 2) Act 1742 (repealed)	16 Geo. 2. c. 13	22 March 1743
An Act for raising, by Annuities and a Lottery, in Manner therein mentioned, the Sum of One Million Eight Hundred Thousand Pounds, at Three Pounds per Centum per Annum, for the Service of the Year One Thousand Seven Hundred and Forty-three. (Repealed by Statute Law Revision Act 1870 (33 & 34 Vict. c. 69))
Mutiny Act 1742 (repealed)	16 Geo. 2. c. 14	22 March 1743
An Act for punishing Mutiny and Desertion; and for the better Payment of the Army and their Quarters. (Repealed by Statute Law Revision Act 1867 (30 & 31 Vict. c. 59))
Return of Offenders from Transportation Act 1742 (repealed)	16 Geo. 2. c. 15	22 March 1743
An Act for the more easy and effectual Conviction of Offenders found at large within the Kingdom of Great Britain, after they have been ordered for Transportation. (Repealed by Transportation Act 1824 (5 Geo. 4. c. 84))
Hertfordshire Roads Act 1742 (repealed)	16 Geo. 2. c. 16	22 March 1743
An Act for enlarging the Term and Powers granted by an Act passed in the sixth Year of the Reign of his present Majesty, intituled, "An Act for the more effectual repairing the Roads leading from Wade's Mill in the County of Hertford, to Barley and Royston in the said County." (Note: Hertfordshire Roads Act 1732 (6 Geo. 2. c. 24)) (Repealed by Roads from Wadesmill to Barley and Royston Act 1821 (1 & 2 Geo. 4. c. xvii) and Annual Turnpike Acts Continuance Act 1872 (35 & 36 Vict. c. 85))
Insolvent Debtors Relief Act 1742 (repealed)	16 Geo. 2. c. 17	22 March 1743
An Act for the Relief of Insolvent Debtors. (Repealed by Statute Law Revision Act 1867 (30 & 31 Vict. c. 59))
Justices Jurisdiction Act 1742 (repealed)	16 Geo. 2. c. 18	22 March 1743
An Act to empower Justices of the Peace to act in certain Cases relating to Parishes and Places, to the Rates and Taxes of which they are rated or chargeable. (Repealed by Justices of the Peace Act 1979 (c. 55))
Epping and Ongar Road Act 1742 (repealed)	16 Geo. 2. c. 19	22 March 1743
An Act for enlarging the Term and Powers granted by an Act passed in the tenth Year of the Reign of his late Majesty King George the First, intituled, "An Act for repairing and amending the Highways from the North Part of Harlow-bush Common, (Note: Harlow, Essex.) in the Parish of Harlow, to Woodford (Note: Woodford, now in Greater London, historically in Essex.) in the County of Essex." (Note: Essex Roads Act 1723 (10 Geo. 1. c. 9)) (Repealed by Road from Harlow Act 1822 (3 Geo. 4. c. xliv))
Warwick Roads Act 1742 (repealed)	16 Geo. 2. c. 20	22 March 1743
An Act to explain and amend an Act passed in the twelfth Year of the Reign of his present Majesty, (Note: Warwick Roads Act 1738 (12 Geo. 2. c. 18)) for repairing the Road from The Dun Cow (Note: The Dun Cow is located at the junction of the B4429 and the A426 in Dunchurch, Warwickshire. 52°20′14″N 1°17′23″W) in Dunchurch, to Hillmorton in the County of Warwick; and from thence to Saint James's End in the Town of Northampton. (Repealed by Warwick and Northampton Roads Act 1781 (21 Geo. 3. c. 106))
Gloucester Roads Act 1742 (repealed)	16 Geo. 2. c. 21	22 March 1743
An Act for continuing and making more effectual an Act passed in the ninth Year of the Reign of his late Majesty King George the First, (Note: Gloucestershire Highways Act 1722 (9 Geo. 1. c. 31)) For repairing the Highways from the City of Gloucester (Note: The North Gate of the City of Gloucester, located on Northgate Street, near the junction with St Aldate Street. 51°52′00″N 2°14′39″W) to the Top of Birdlip-hill, (Note: The top of Birlip Hill is in the village of Birdlip, Gloucestershire. 51°49′41″N 2°06′38″W) being the Road to London; and from the Foot of the said Hill (Note: The junction of Cirencester Road and Ermin Way. 51°50′23″N 2°08′27″W) to the Top of Crickley-hill, (Note: The location of the former Air Balloon public house, where the A417 meets the A436. 51°50′37″N 2°05′45″W) being the Road to Oxford. (Repealed by Gloucester and Crickley Hill Road Act 1806 (46 Geo. 3. c. l))
Gloucester Roads (No. 2) Act 1742 (repealed)	16 Geo. 2. c. 22	22 March 1743
An Act for repairing the Road leading from the Town of Cirencester in the County of Gloucester, to a Place called The Monument, upon Lansdown, in the same County. (Repealed by Cirencester Road Act 1812 (52 Geo. 3. c. xxvii) (Note: Incorrectly cited as "52 Geo. 3. c. xvii" in the Chronological Table of the Statutes.) and Annual Turnpike Acts Continuance Act 1873 (36 & 37 Vict. c. 90))
Luton and Saint Albans Road Act 1742 (repealed)	16 Geo. 2. c. 23	22 March 1743
An Act for continuing an Act made in the thirteenth Year of the Reign of his late Majesty King George the First, intituled, "An Act for amending and repairing the Roads from Luton in the County of Bedford, to Westwood-gate in the said County; and for repairing the Roads from Luton to Saint Alban's, in the County of Hertford." (Note: Luton and Saint Albans Road Act 1726 (13 Geo. 1. c. 17)) (Repealed by Maulden Wood Corner and Westwood Gate Road (Bedfordshire) Act 1838 (1 & 2 Vict. c. xlix) (Note: Incorrectly cited as "1–2 Vict. c. xliv" in the Chronological Table of the Statutes.) and Luton District Road Act 1856 (19 & 20 Vict. c. cviii))
Land Tax (Commissioners) Act 1742 (repealed)	16 Geo. 2. c. 24	21 April 1743
An Act for rectifying Mistakes in the Names of the Commissioners for the Land Tax, for the Year One Thousand Seven Hundred and Forty-two; and for the appointing other Persons, together with those named for the said Year, to put in Execution an Act of this present Session of Parliament, intituled, "An Act for granting an Aid to His Majesty, by a Land Tax, to be raised in Great Britain, for the Service of the Year One Thousand Seven Hundred and Forty-three." (Note: Land Tax Act 1742 (16 Geo. 2. c. 1)) (Repealed by Statute Law Revision Act 1867 (30 & 31 Vict. c. 59))
Supply, etc. Act 1742 (repealed)	16 Geo. 2. c. 25	21 April 1743
An Act for granting to his Majesty the Sum of one million out of the Sinking Fund, and for applying a further Sum therein mentioned, for the Service of the Year one thousand seven hundred and forty-three, and for the further appropriating the Supplies granted in this Session of Parliament. (Repealed by Statute Law Revision Act 1867 (30 & 31 Vict. c. 59))
Continuance of Laws, etc. Act 1742 (repealed)	16 Geo. 2. c. 26	21 April 1743
An Act for continuing several Laws, relating to the Allowance upon the Exportation of British-made Gunpowder; to the Importation of Naval Stores from the British Colonies in America; to the additional Number of One Hundred Hackney Chairs, and to the Powers given for regulating Hackney Coaches and Chairs; for punishing the Venders of unstamped News Papers; for allowing the Importation of Hemp or Flax manufactured in Ireland, though not sworn to be of the Growth of Ireland; and for the Relief of Bryon Blundell, in respect to the Duty on some White Salt lost in a Storm at Sea. (Repealed by Statute Law Revision Act 1867 (30 & 31 Vict. c. 59))
Bankrupts Act 1742 (repealed)	16 Geo. 2. c. 27	21 April 1743
An Act to continue an Act, made in the Fifth Year of the Reign of His present Majesty, intituled, "An Act to prevent the committing of Frauds by Bankrupts." (Note: Bankrupts Act 1731 (5 Geo. 2. c. 30)) (Repealed by Statute Law Revision Act 1867 (30 & 31 Vict. c. 59))
Bethnal Green Parish Act 1742 (repealed)	16 Geo. 2. c. 28	21 April 1743
An Act to make the Hamlet of Bethnal Green in the Parish of Saint Dunstan, Stepney, in the County of Middlesex, a separate and distinct Parish, and for erecting a Parish Church therein. (Repealed by Bethnal Green Improvement Act 1813 (53 Geo. 3. c. cxiii), St. Matthew's Church, Bethnal Green Act 1845 (8 & 9 Vict. c. clxxx) and London Government (Borough of Bethnal Green) Order in Council 1901 (SR&O 1901/212))
Highways Act 1742 or the Carts Act 1743 (repealed)	16 Geo. 2. c. 29	21 April 1743
An Act for allowing Carts to be drawn with Four Horses. (Repealed by Highways (No. 2) Act 1766 (7 Geo. 3. c. 42))
Indemnity Act 1742 (repealed)	16 Geo. 2. c. 30	21 April 1743
An Act to indemnify Persons who have omitted to qualify themselves for Offices and Employments within the Time limited by Law, and for allowing further Time for that Purpose; and also for amending so much of an Act, made in the Twenty-fifth Year of the Reign of King Charles the Second, intituled, "An Act for preventing Dangers which may happen from Popish Recusants," (Note: Popish Recusants Act 1672 (25 Cha. 2. 2)) as relates to the Time for receiving the Sacrament of the Lord's Supper, now limited by the said Act. (Repealed by Statute Law Revision Act 1867 (30 & 31 Vict. c. 59))
Prison (Escape) Act 1742 (repealed)	16 Geo. 2. c. 31	21 April 1743
An Act for the further Punishment of Persons who shall aid or assist Prisoners to attempt to escape out of lawful Custody. (Repealed for England and Wales by Criminal Law Act 1967 (c. 58) and for Scotland by Statute Law (Repeals) Act 1971 (c. 52))
Papists Act 1742 (repealed)	16 Geo. 2. c. 32	21 April 1743
An Act for allowing further Time for Inrolment of Deeds and Wills made by Papists; and for Relief of Protestant Purchasers, Devisees, and Lessees. (Repealed by Statute Law Revision Act 1867 (30 & 31 Vict. c. 59))

=== Private acts ===
Short title	Citation	Royal assent
Long title
Naturalization of Daniel Vialars, Peter Thomegay and Others Act 1742	16 Geo. 2. c. 1 Pr.	21 December 1742
An Act for naturalizing Daniel Vialars, Peter Thomegay, and others.
Vesting lands in Sturton and Walkeringham (Nottinghamshire) entailed by the will of Evelyn late Duke of Kingston, in Evelyn now Duke of Kingston in fee simple, free from the uses, trusts and limitations of the will and settling other lands of greater value to the like uses.	16 Geo. 2. c. 2 Pr.	22 March 1743
An Act for vesting divers Lands and Hereditaments, in Sturton and Walkeringham, in the County of Nottingham, entailed by the Will of Evelyn late Duke of Kingston, deceased, in Evelyn now Duke of Kingston, in Fee Simple, discharged of the Uses, Trusts, and Limitations, of the said Will; and for settling, in Lieu thereof, other Lands and Hereditaments, of greater Value, to the like Uses.
Marquis of Halifax's Estate Act 1742	16 Geo. 2. c. 3 Pr.	22 March 1743
An Act for confirming and establishing a Partition made between the Coheirs of the late Marquis of Halifax, of divers Estates therein mentioned; and for other Purposes in this Act expressed.
Lord Petre's Marriage Settlement Act 1742	16 Geo. 2. c. 4 Pr.	22 March 1743
An Act to empower Two of the Trustees named in the Marriage Settlement of the late Lord Petre, deceased, to grant Leases, without the Concurrence of the other Trustee named in the said Settlement.
Restoration of Francis Duke of Buccleuch to the dignities and titles of Earl of Doncaster and Baron Scot of Tindal.	16 Geo. 2. c. 5 Pr.	22 March 1743
An Act for restoring Francis Duke of Buccleuch to the Dignities and Titles of Earl of Doncaster and Baron Scot of Tindal.
Exchanging part of Nuneaton (Warwickshire) vicarage's glebe lands and hereditaments for rectorial tithes and lands also in Nuneaton belong to the impropriator.	16 Geo. 2. c. 6 Pr.	22 March 1743
An Act for exchanging Part of the Glebe Lands and Hereditaments belonging to the Vicarage of Nuneaton, in the County of Warwick, for the Rectorial Tithes and certain Lands in the Parish of Nuneaton, belonging to the Impropriator.
Charles Holder's Estate Act 1742	16 Geo. 2. c. 7 Pr.	22 March 1743
An Act for Sale of the Manor of Bathampton, being the Estate of Charles Holder Esquire, for Payment of Encumbrances affecting the same; and for other Purposes therein mentioned.
Making perpetual an agreement for exchange of lands for tithes between Evelyn Chadwicke, lord of the manor of West Leake (Nottinghamshire) and Granville Wheeler, rector of the parish.	16 Geo. 2. c. 8 Pr.	22 March 1743
An Act for making perpetual an Agreement for the Exchange of Lands for Tithes, made between Evelyn Chadwicke Esquire, Lord of the Manor of West Leake, in the County of Nottingham, and Granville Wheler Clerk, Rector of the Parish Church there.
Enabling the trustees of the settlement and will of Robert Trefusis (deceased) to lease part of his estate in Cornwall during the minority of his son Robert Cotton Trefusis.	16 Geo. 2. c. 9 Pr.	22 March 1743
An Act to enable Trustees, named in the Settlement and Will of Robert Trefusis Esquire, deceased, during the Minority of his Son Robert Cotton Trefusis, to make Leases of Part of his Estate in the County of Cornwall.
Thomas Fitzherbert's Estate Act 1742	16 Geo. 2. c. 10 Pr.	22 March 1743
An Act for empowering Thomas Fitzherbert the Younger Esquire to make Jointures, during the Life-time of Thomas Fitzherbert Esquire his Father: and also to grant Annuities to his Younger Sons, in such Manner as is therein mentioned.
William Gore's Estate Act 1742	16 Geo. 2. c. 11 Pr.	22 March 1743
An Act for Sale of the settled Estates of William Gore Esquire, deceased, in the County of Middlesex, and City of London, for Payment of his Debts and Legacies; and for rendering a Power contained in his Will more effectual.
Thomas and Joseph Gape's Estates Act 1742	16 Geo. 2. c. 12 Pr.	22 March 1743
An Act for enabling Thomas Gape and Joseph Gape Esquires to make Jointures and Leases of the Estates devised to them respectively, by the Will of William Gape Esquire, their late Father, deceased.
Empowering Anna Norris, mother and guardian of John Norris (an infant), to grant leases of lands in Fenchurch Street in the parish of St. Benedict Gracechurch, London.	16 Geo. 2. c. 13 Pr.	22 March 1743
An Act to empower Anna Norris Widow, Mother and Guardian to John Norris an Infant, to grant One or more Building Lease or Leases of certain Messuages, and a Piece or Parcel of Ground, in Fenchurch Street, in the Parish of St. Benedict Gracechurch, London.
Great Brington (Northamptonshire) Inclosure Act 1742	16 Geo. 2. c. 14 Pr.	22 March 1743
An Act for dividing and enclosing certain Common Fields, within the Parish of Great Brington, in the County of Northampton.
Confirming and rendering more effectual articles of agreement and an award for inclosing Aston Tirrold (Berkshire).	16 Geo. 2. c. 15 Pr.	22 March 1743
An Act for confirming and rendering more effectual certain Articles of Agreement, and an Award, for enclosing and dividing certain Common Fields and Common Downs, within the Manor and Parish of Aston Tirrold, in the County of Berks.
Dummer (Hampshire) Inclosure Act 1742	16 Geo. 2. c. 16 Pr.	22 March 1743
An Act for enclosing and dividing the Common Fields and Waste Grounds, lying within the Manor of Dummer, in the Parish of Dummer, in the County of Southampton.
Confirming, establishing and making effectual articles of agreement for inclosing Earley (Berkshire) and exchanging several ancient inclosures therein.	16 Geo. 2. c. 17 Pr.	22 March 1743
An Act for confirming, establishing, and making effectual, certain Articles of Agreement, made and entered into, for enclosing and dividing several Common Fields, lying in Earley, in the Parish of Soning, in the County of Berks; and for exchanging several ancient Enclosures in Earley aforesaid.
Elvington Moor (Yorkshire) Inclosure Act 1742	16 Geo. 2. c. 18 Pr.	22 March 1743
An Act for enclosing and dividing the Common, or Moor, called Elvington Moor, within the Manor and Parish of Elvington, in the County of York.
Making exemplification of James Earl of Anglesey's marriage settlement evidence in all courts in Britain and Ireland.	16 Geo. 2. c. 19 Pr.	22 March 1743
An Act for making the Exemplification of the Settlement made by James Earl of Anglesey, on his Marriage with Katherine now Dutchess Dowager of Buckinghamshire and Normanby, Evidence in all Courts of Law and Equity in Great Britain and Ireland.
Making exemplification of Henry Earl of Thomond and Viscount Tadcaster's will evidence in all courts in Britain and Ireland.	16 Geo. 2. c. 20 Pr.	22 March 1743
An Act for making the Exemplification of the last Will of Henry late Earl of Thomond and Viscount Tadcaster Evidence in all Courts of Law and Equity in Great Britain and Ireland.
Plunkett's Estate Act 1742	16 Geo. 2. c. 21 Pr.	22 March 1743
An Act for vesting the Remainder in Fee of several Lands in Ireland, the Estate of Arthur Plunket Esquire, in Trustees, in order to sell such Lands to Protestant Purchasers.
Compton's Name Act 1742	16 Geo. 2. c. 22 Pr.	22 March 1743
An Act to enable Henry Willis Esquire, now called Henry Compton, and his Issue Male and Descendants, to take and use the Surname of Compton, pursuant to the Will of Elianor Bave Widow, deceased.
Rookes's Name Act 1742	16 Geo. 2. c. 23 Pr.	22 March 1743
An Act to enable Edward Rookes Esquire, to take and use the Surname of Leedes only, pursuant to the last Will and Testament of Robert Leedes, late of North Milforth, in the County of York, Esquire, deceased.
Crayle Bellamy's Name Act 1742	16 Geo. 2. c. 24 Pr.	22 March 1743
An Act to enable Crayle Bellamy Esquire to take and use the Surname of Crayle.
Vesting in John Elwick the sole property of an engine for making stone pipe and enlarging the term granted by letters patent for that purpose.	16 Geo. 2. c. 25 Pr.	22 March 1743
An Act for vesting in John Elwick Esquire the sole Property of an Engine for making Stone Pipes; and to enlarge the Term granted by Letters Patent for that Purpose.
Naturalization of John Bockholt and Swain Rose Act 1742	16 Geo. 2. c. 26 Pr.	22 March 1743
An Act for naturalizing John Bockholt and Swain Rose.
Naturalization of Paul Torras, John Zurhorst and Others Act 1742	16 Geo. 2. c. 27 Pr.	22 March 1743
An Act for naturalizing Paul Torras, John Godfrey Zurhorst, and others.
Naturalization of James Serces Clerk Act 1742	16 Geo. 2. c. 28 Pr.	22 March 1743
An Act for naturalizing James Serces Clerk.
Dodwell's Estate Act 1742	16 Geo. 2. c. 29 Pr.	21 April 1743
An Act for Sale of a Tenement, adjoining to Northumberland House in The Strand, Part of the Estate of Sir William Dodwell Knight, deceased; and for laying out the Money arising thereby in the Purchase of Lands, to be settled to the same Uses.
Vesting lands in Ravensworth and Whashton (Yorkshire) in Andrew Perrot, free from uses and trusts of James Cooke's marriage settlement and settling in lieu other lands of greater value to the same uses.	16 Geo. 2. c. 30 Pr.	21 April 1743
An Act for vesting divers Lands and Hereditaments, in Ravensworth and Washton, in the County of York, in Andrew Perrot Gentleman, discharged of the Uses and Trusts of the Marriage Settlement of James Cooke the Younger; and for settling, in Lieu thereof, other Lands and Hereditaments, of greater Value, to the same Uses.
Establishing an agreement relating to settlement and disposition of the estate of Thomas Savage (deceased) between his daughters and coheirs Margarett Savage and Elizabeth Byrche.	16 Geo. 2. c. 31 Pr.	21 April 1743
An Act for establishing an Agreement, between Margaret Savage Spinster and Elizabeth Byrche Widow, Two of the Daughters and Coheirs of Thomas Savage Esquire, deceased, relating to the Settlement and Disposition of the Real and Personal Estate of the said Thomas Savage.

=== Sources ===
- Pickering, Danby, ed. (1765). The Statutes at Large. Vol. 18: From the 15th to the 20th Year of King George II. Cambridge: Joseph Bentham – via Internet Archive.
- Pickering, Danby, ed. (1765). The Statutes at Large. Vol. 18: From the 15th to the 20th Year of King George II. Cambridge: Joseph Bentham – via Google Books.
- Journals of the House of Commons. Vol. 24. London: His Majesty's Stationery Office. 1803. pp. 336–480 – via Google Books.
- Chronological Table of and Index to the Statutes. Vol. 1: To the End of the Session 59 Vict. Sess. 2 (1895) (13th ed.). London: Her Majesty's Stationery Office. 1896. pp. 107–108 – via Google Books.

== See also ==
- List of acts of the Parliament of Great Britain
