= Continuance, etc., of Acts, 1735 =

Act of the Parliament of Great Britain

- Act of Parliament
- Parliament of Great Britain
- Long title: An Act for reviving and continuing the Acts therein mentioned; and for explaining and amending a Clause in an Act made in the First Year of the Reign of His late Majesty King George the First, intituled, "An Act for making the Laws for repairing the Highways more effectual," relating to the appointing Scavengers in Cities and Market Towns, and the ordering the Assessments for the repairing and cleansing the Streets therein.
- Citation: 9 Geo. 2. c. 18
- Territorial extent: Great Britain

Dates
- Royal assent: 5 May 1736
- Commencement: 15 January 1736 (Note: Start of session.)
- Repealed: 15 July 1867
Other legislation
Amends	See § Continued enactments
Repealed by	Statute Law Revision Act 1867
Relates to	See Expiring laws continuance acts

Status: Repealed

Text of statute as originally enacted

The Continuance, etc., of Acts, 1735 (9 Geo. 2. c. 18) was an act of the Parliament of Great Britain that continued various older acts.

== Background ==
In the United Kingdom, acts of Parliament remain in force until expressly repealed. Many acts of parliament, however, contained time-limited sunset clauses, requiring legislation to revive enactments that had expired or to continue enactments that would otherwise expire.

The Select Committee on Temporary Laws, Expired or Expiring, appointed in 1796, inspected and considered all temporary laws, observing irregularities in the construction of expiring laws continuance acts, making recommendations and emphasising the importance of the Committee for Expired and Expiring Laws.

== Provisions ==
=== Continued enactments ===
Section 1 revived and made the Perjury Act 1728 (2 Geo. 2. c. 25) perpetual from 24 June 1735. Section 2 continued the Bankrupts Act 1731 (5 Geo. 2. c. 30) from the expiration of the act until the end of the next session of parliament after 29 September 1743. Section 3 extended the powers under the Highways Act 1715 (1 Geo. 1. St. 2. c. 52) (Note: This is the citation in the Statutes of the Realm.) to appoint street scavengers and levy taxes for street cleaning and repair to all market towns, not just cities.

== Subsequent developments ==
The whole act was repealed by section 1 of, and the schedule to, the Statute Law Revision Act 1867 (30 & 31 Vict. c. 59), which came into force on 15 July 1867.
