= List of acts of the Parliament of Great Britain from 1735 =

This is a complete list of acts of the Parliament of Great Britain for the year 1735.

For acts passed until 1707, see the list of acts of the Parliament of England and the list of acts of the Parliament of Scotland. See also the list of acts of the Parliament of Ireland.

For acts passed from 1801 onwards, see the list of acts of the Parliament of the United Kingdom. For acts of the devolved parliaments and assemblies in the United Kingdom, see the list of acts of the Scottish Parliament, the list of acts of the Northern Ireland Assembly, and the list of acts and measures of Senedd Cymru; see also the list of acts of the Parliament of Northern Ireland.

The number shown after each act's title is its chapter number. Acts are cited using this number, preceded by the year(s) of the reign during which the relevant parliamentary session was held; thus the Union with Ireland Act 1800 is cited as "39 & 40 Geo. 3. c. 67", meaning the 67th act passed during the session that started in the 39th year of the reign of George III and which finished in the 40th year of that reign. Note that the modern convention is to use Arabic numerals in citations (thus "41 Geo. 3" rather than "41 Geo. III"). Acts of the last session of the Parliament of Great Britain and the first session of the Parliament of the United Kingdom are both cited as "41 Geo. 3".

Acts passed by the Parliament of Great Britain did not have a short title; however, some of these acts have subsequently been given a short title by acts of the Parliament of the United Kingdom (such as the Short Titles Act 1896).

Before the Acts of Parliament (Commencement) Act 1793 came into force on 8 April 1793, acts passed by the Parliament of Great Britain were deemed to have come into effect on the first day of the session in which they were passed. Because of this, the years given in the list below may in fact be the year before a particular act was passed.

== 9 Geo. 2 ==
The second session of the 8th Parliament of Great Britain, which met from 15 January 1736 until 20 May 1736.

This session was also traditionally cited as 9 G. 2.

=== Public acts ===
| Short title | Citation | Royal assent |
Long title
| Taxation Act 1735 (repealed) | 9 Geo. 2. c. 1 | 19 February 1736 |
An Act for continuing the Duties upon Malt, Mum, Cyder, and Perry, in that Part of Great Britain called England; and for granting to His Majesty certain Duties upon Malt, Mum, Cyder, and Perry, in that Part of Great Britain called Scotland, for the Service of the Year One Thousand Seven Hundred and Thirty-six. (Repealed by Statute Law Revision Act 1867 (30 & 31 Vict. c. 59))
| Mutiny Act 1735 (repealed) | 9 Geo. 2. c. 2 | 24 March 1736 |
An Act for punishing Mutiny and Desertion; and for the better Payment of the Army and their Quarters. (Repealed by Statute Law Revision Act 1867 (30 & 31 Vict. c. 59))
| Land Tax Act 1735 (repealed) | 9 Geo. 2. c. 3 | 24 March 1736 |
An Act for granting an Aid to His Majesty, by a Land Tax, to be raised in Great Britain, for the Service of the Year One Thousand Seven Hundred and Thirty-six. (Repealed by Statute Law Revision Act 1867 (30 & 31 Vict. c. 59))
| Manchester Act 1736 or the Woollen, etc. Manufacturers Act 1735 (repealed) | 9 Geo. 2. c. 4 | 24 March 1736 |
An Act to amend an Act passed in the Seventh Year of the Reign of His late Majesty King George the First, intituled, "An Act to preserve and encourage the Woollen and Silk Manufactures of this Kingdom; and for more effectually employing the Poor, by prohibiting the Use and Wear of all printed, painted, stained, or dyed Calicoes, in Apparel, Household-stuff, Furniture, or otherwise, after the 25th Day of December 1722, except as is therein excepted," (Note: Woollen, etc., Manufactures Act 1720 (7 Geo. 1. St. 1. c. 7)) so far as relates to Goods made of Linen Yarn and Cotton Wool manufactured in Great Britain. (Repealed by Statute Law Revision Act 1867 (30 & 31 Vict. c. 59))
| Witchcraft Act 1735 (repealed) | 9 Geo. 2. c. 5 | 24 March 1736 |
An Act to repeal the Statute made in the First Year of the Reign of King James the First, intituled, "An Act against Conjuration, Witchcraft, and dealing with evil and wicked Spirits," (Note: Witchcraft Act 1603 (1 Jas. 1. c. 12)) except so much thereof as repeals an Act of the Fifth Year of the Reign of Queen Elizabeth, against Conjurations, Enchantments, and Witchcrafts; and to repeal an Act passed in the Parliament of Scotland, in the Ninth Parliament of Queen Mary, intituled, "Anentis Witchcrafts;" (Note: Witchcraft Act (Scotland) 1563 (c. 9 (S))) and for punishing such Persons as pretend to exercise or use any Kind of Witchcraft, Sorcery, Enchantment, or Conjuration. (Repealed by Statute Law Revision Act 1867 (30 & 31 Vict. c. 59), Statute Law Revision Act 1887 (50 & 51 Vict. c. 59), Statute Law Revision Act 1948 (11 & 12 Geo. 6. c. 62) and Fraudulent Mediums Act 1951 (14 & 15 Geo. 6. c. 33))
| Indemnity Act 1735 (repealed) | 9 Geo. 2. c. 6 | 24 March 1736 |
An Act to indemnify Persons who have omitted to read the Prayers, and make and subscribe the Declarations, directed to be read, made, and subscribed, by the Act of Uniformity of the Thirteenth and Fourteenth Year of the Reign of King Charles the Second, (Note: Act of Uniformity 1662 (14 Cha. 2. c. 4)) within the Time limited by Law; and for allowing further Time for doing thereof. (Repealed by Statute Law Revision Act 1867 (30 & 31 Vict. c. 59))
| Kent Roads Act 1735 (repealed) | 9 Geo. 2. c. 7 | 24 March 1736 |
An Act to explain and amend an Act, passed in the First Year of the Reign of His present Majesty intituled, "An Act for repairing and enlarging the Road leading from the House called The Sign of the Bells, in the Parish of Saint Margaret's in Rochester, to Maidstone, and other Roads therein mentioned, in the County of Kent." (Note: Rochester to Maidstone Road Act 1727 (1 Geo. 2. St. 2. c. 12)) (Repealed by Kent Roads (No. 2) Act 1773 (13 Geo. 3. c. 114), Rochester and Maidstone Road Act 1821 (1 & 2 Geo. 4. c. xl) and Annual Turnpike Acts Continuance Act 1867 (30 & 31 Vict. c. 121))
| Saint Martin's in the Fields Watching Act 1735 (repealed) | 9 Geo. 2. c. 8 | 24 March 1736 |
An Act for the better regulating the Nightly Watch and Beadles, within the Parish of Saint Martin in the Fields, within the Liberties of the City of Westminster. (Repealed by London Government (City of Westminster) Order in Council 1901 (SR&O 1901/278))
| Bedfordshire and Huntingdonshire Roads Act 1735 (repealed) | 9 Geo. 2. c. 9 | 24 March 1736 |
An Act for enlarging the Term and Powers granted by an Act passed in the Eleventh Year of His late Majesty King George the First, intituled, "An Act for repairing and amending the Road from Biggleswade, in the County of Bedford, to Bugden; and through Alconberry, to the Top of Alconberry Hill, or Cross Post leading into Sautery Lane, on the York and Edinburgh Road; and from the said Town of Bugden to the Town of Huntingdon, and from Cross Hall, in Eaton Soken, in the said County of Bedford, to Great Stoughton Common, in the said County of Huntingdon." (Note: Bedfordshire Roads Act 1724 (11 Geo. 1. c. 20)) (Repealed by Biggleswade and Alconbury Hill Road Act 1816 (56 Geo. 3. c. lii))
| Kent Roads (No. 2) Act 1735 (repealed) | 9 Geo. 2. c. 10 | 24 March 1736 |
An Act for repairing and widening the Road leading from Saint Dunstan's Cross, near the City of Canterbury, to the Water-side at Whitstable, in the County of Kent. (Repealed by Grantham Road Act 1804 (44 Geo. 3. c. l))
| Beaconsfield and Stokenchurch Road Act 1735 (repealed) | 9 Geo. 2. c. 11 | 24 March 1736 |
An Act for enlarging the Term and Powers granted by an Act passed in the Fifth Year of the Reign of His late Majesty King George the First, intituled, "An Act for repairing the Road from Beconsfield, in the County of Bucks, to Stoken Church, in the County of Oxon." (Note: Beaconsfield and Stokenchurch Road Act 1718 (5 Geo. 1. c. 2 Pr.)) (Repealed by Beaconsfield and Stokenchurch Road Act 1823 (4 Geo. 4. c. cviii))
| Maidstone Gaol, Kent (Expenses) Act 1735 (repealed) | 9 Geo. 2. c. 12 | 5 May 1736 |
An Act to enable the Justices of the Peace acting for the Western Division of the County of Kent to purchase a convenient Piece of Ground, for building a Gaol for the said County; and for empowering the said Justices to apply Part of the County Stock of the said Division towards the same. (Repealed by Kent Gaol and County Expenses Act 1803 (43 Geo. 3. c. lviii) and Statute Law Revision Act 1948 (11 & 12 Geo. 6. c. 62))
| Saint Paul, Covent Garden (Watching) Act 1735 (repealed) | 9 Geo. 2. c. 13 | 5 May 1736 |
An Act for the better regulating the Nightly Watch and Beadles, within the Parish of Saint Paul, Covent Garden, within the Liberties of the City of Westminster. (Repealed by Parish of St. Paul Covent Garden Act 1829 (10 Geo. 4. c. lxviii) and London Government (City of Westminster) Order in Council 1901 (SR&O 1901/278))
| Berkshire and Oxfordshire Roads Act 1735 (repealed) | 9 Geo. 2. c. 14 | 5 May 1736 |
An Act for repairing the Roads leading from Henley Bridge, (Note: Henley Bridge in Henley-on-Thames. 51°32′15″N 0°54′01″W) in the County of Oxford, to Dorchester Bridge, (Note: Dorchester Bridge on Henley Road, Dorchester on Thames, Oxfordshire. 51°38′28″N 1°09′49″W) and from thence to Culham Bridge, (Note: Culham Bridge, off the A415 near Culham, Oxfordshire. 51°39′30″N 1°16′38″W) and to a Place called Milestone, in the Road leading to Magdalen Bridge, in the said County. (Repealed by Henley-on-Thames, Dorchester and Oxford Roads Act 1821 (1 & 2 Geo. 4. c. xxvi) and Culham, Abingdon and Fyfield Roads Act 1822 (3 Geo. 4. c. xxxvi))
| Windsor Bridge Act 1735 (repealed) | 9 Geo. 2. c. 15 | 5 May 1736 |
An Act for enabling the Mayor, Bailiffs, and Burgesses, of the Borough of New Windsor, in the County of Berks, to repair and maintain their great Bridge over the River of Thames, and the Way thereon, leading from the said Borough of New Windsor, to Eton, in the County of Bucks. (Repealed by Windsor Bridge and Approaches Act 1819 (59 Geo. 3. c. cxxvi))
| Reading and Basingstoke Road Act 1735 (repealed) | 9 Geo. 2. c. 16 | 5 May 1736 |
An Act for continuing the Term and Powers granted by an Act passed in the Fourth Year of the Reign of His late Majesty King George the First, intituled, "An Act for repairing the Highways from Crown Corner, (Note: Crown Corner is located in Reading at the junction of the A4 Crown Street/London Road, and the A327 Silver Street/London Street. 51°27′02″N 0°58′01″W) in the Town of Reading (leading by and through the several Parishes of Shinfield and Heckfield), in the several Counties of Berks, Wilts, and Southampton, to Basingstoke, in the said County of Southampton." (Note: Reading and Basingstoke Road Act 1717 (4 Geo. 1. c. 7 Pr.)) (Repealed by Road from Reading to Basingstoke Act 1801 (41 Geo. 3. (U.K.). c. lix))
| Saint Margaret and Saint John, Westminster (Watching) Act 1735 (repealed) | 9 Geo. 2. c. 17 | 5 May 1736 |
An Act for the better regulating the Nightly Watch and Beadles, within the Parishes of Saint Margaret and Saint John the Evangelist, within the City and Liberty of Westminster. (Repealed by Tothill Fields Improvement Act 1825 (6 Geo. 4. c. cxxxiv) and London Government (City of Westminster) Order in Council 1901 (SR&O 1901/278))
| Continuance, etc., of Acts, 1735 (repealed) | 9 Geo. 2. c. 18 | 5 May 1736 |
An Act for reviving and continuing the Acts therein mentioned; and for explaining and amending a Clause in an Act made in the First Year of the Reign of His late Majesty King George the First, intituled, "An Act for making the Laws for repairing the Highways more effectual," (Note: Highways Act 1715 (1 Geo. 1. St. 2. c. 52)) relating to the appointing Scavengers in Cities and Market Towns, and the ordering the Assessments for the repairing and cleansing the Streets therein. (Repealed by Statute Law Revision Act 1867 (30 & 31 Vict. c. 59))
| Westminster (Watching) Act 1735 (repealed) | 9 Geo. 2. c. 19 | 5 May 1736 |
An Act for the better regulating the Nightly Watch and Beadles, within the Parish of Saint Anne, within the Liberties of the City of Westminster. (Repealed by London Government (City of Westminster) Order in Council 1901 (SR&O 1901/278))
| London Street Lighting Act 1735 (repealed) | 9 Geo. 2. c. 20 | 5 May 1736 |
An Act for the better enlightening of the Streets of the City of London. (Repealed by London Street Lighting Act 1743 (17 Geo. 2. c. 29))
| Berkshire Roads Act 1735 (repealed) | 9 Geo. 2. c. 21 | 5 May 1736 |
An Act for repairing the Highways from Sunning Lane End, next Twyford, to The Old Bear Inn, in Reading, in the County of Berks. (Repealed by Roads from Maidenhead Bridge to Reading and to Henley Bridge Act 1806 (46 Geo. 3. c. cxlv) and Maidenhead, Reading and Henley Road Act 1826 (7 Geo. 4. c. lxx))
| Gainsborough Church Act 1735 | 9 Geo. 2. c. 22 | 5 May 1736 |
An Act for re-building the Parish Church of Gainsburgh, in the County of Lincoln.
| Spirit Duties Act 1735 or the Gin Act 1736 (repealed) | 9 Geo. 2. c. 23 | 5 May 1736 |
An Act for laying a Duty upon the Retailers of Spirituous Liquors; and for licensing the Retailers thereof. (Repealed by Statute Law Revision Act 1867 (30 & 31 Vict. c. 59))
| Princess of Wales Act 1735 (repealed) | 9 Geo. 2. c. 24 | 5 May 1736 |
An Act for exhibiting a Bill in this present Parliament, for naturalizing her Royal Highness the Princess of Wales. (Repealed by Statute Law Revision Act 1867 (30 & 31 Vict. c. 59))
| Relief of Shipwrecked Mariners Act 1735 (repealed) | 9 Geo. 2. c. 25 | 5 May 1736 |
An Act for more equal paying and better collecting certain small Sums for Relief of shipwrecked Mariners and distressed Persons, His Majesty's Subjects, in the Ports of Cadiz and Port Saint Mary's, in the Kingdom of Spain; and for other Uses usually contributed to by the Merchants trading to the said Ports. (Repealed by Consular Advances Act 1825 (6 Geo. 4. c. 87))
| Indemnity, etc. Act 1735 (repealed) | 9 Geo. 2. c. 26 | 5 May 1736 |
An Act for indemnifying Persons who have omitted to qualify themselves for Offices within the Time limited by Law, and for allowing further Time for that Purpose; and for amending so much of an Act passed in the Second Year of the Reign of His present Majesty, (Note: Indemnity Act 1728 (2 Geo. 2. c. 31)) as requires Persons to qualify themselves for Offices before the End of the next Term or Quarter Sessions; and also for enlarging the Time limited by Law for making and subscribing the Declaration against Transubstantiation; and for allowing further Time for Enrolment of Deeds and Wills made by Papists, and for Relief of Protestant Purchasers, Devisees, and Lessees. (Repealed by Promissory Oaths Act 1871 (34 & 35 Vict. c. 48))
| Irvine Beer Duties Act 1735 (repealed) | 9 Geo. 2. c. 27 | 5 May 1736 |
An Act for laying a Duty of Two Pennies Scots, or One Sixth Part of a Penny Sterling, upon every Scots Pint of Ale and Beer brewed or brought into and sold within the Town of Irvine and Liberties thereof; and for laying a Duty of One Penny Sterling upon every Ton, or Ten Horse-loads, of Coals carried to the Harbour of the said Town, and shipped there for Transportation. (Repealed by Statute Law Revision Act 1948 (11 & 12 Geo. 6. c. 62))
| Royal Family Act 1735 (repealed) | 9 Geo. 2. c. 28 | 20 May 1736 |
An Act for naturalizing her Royal Highness the Princess of Wales. (Repealed by Statute Law Revision Act 1948 (11 & 12 Geo. 6. c. 62))
| Westminster Bridge Act 1735 (repealed) | 9 Geo. 2. c. 29 | 20 May 1736 |
An Act for building a Bridge cross the River Thames, from The New Palace Yard, in the City of Westminster, to the opposite Shore in the County of Surrey. (Repealed by Capital Punishment Act 1820 (1 Geo. 4. c. 116) and Westminster Bridge Act 1853 (16 & 17 Vict. c. 46))
| Foreign Enlistment Act 1735 (repealed) | 9 Geo. 2. c. 30 | 20 May 1736 |
An Act to prevent the listing His Majesty's Subjects to serve as Soldiers, without His Majesty's License. (Repealed by Foreign Enlistment Act 1819 (59 Geo. 3. c. 69))
| Glasgow Beer Duties Act 1735 (repealed) | 9 Geo. 2. c. 31 | 20 May 1736 |
An Act for continuing the Duty of Two Pennies Scots, or One Sixth of a Penny Sterling, on every Pint of Ale and Beer that shall be vended or sold within the City of Glasgow; and for extending the same over the Villages of Gorbells and Port Glasgow, and Privileges thereof, for the Benefit of the said City and Villages. (Repealed by Statute Law Revision Act 1948 (11 & 12 Geo. 6. c. 62))
| Stamp Duties Act 1735 (repealed) | 9 Geo. 2. c. 32 | 20 May 1736 |
An Act for continuing (for the Purposes therein mentioned) the additional Duties upon stamped Vellum, Parchment, and Paper, laid by an Act passed in the Twelfth Year of the Reign of His late Majesty King George the First. (Note: Suitors of Court of Chancery (No. 2) Act 1725 (12 Geo. 1. c. 33)) (Repealed by Statute Law Revision Act 1867 (30 & 31 Vict. c. 59))
| Lobsters (Scotland) Act 1735 (repealed) | 9 Geo. 2. c. 33 | 20 May 1736 |
An Act to render the Law more effectual for preventing the Importation of Fresh Fish taken by Foreigners; and to explain so much of an Act, made in the Thirteenth and Fourteenth Year of the Reign of King Charles the Second, (Note: Customs Act 1662 (14 Cha. 2. c. 11)) as relates to Ships exporting Fish to the Ports of The Mediterranean Sea; and for the better Preservation of the Fry of Lobsters on the Coasts of Scotland. (Repealed by Statute Law Revision Act 1867 (30 & 31 Vict. c. 59), Statute Law Revision Act 1887 (50 & 51 Vict. c. 59) and Statute Law Revision Act 1948 (11 & 12 Geo. 6. c. 62))
| National Debt Act 1735 (repealed) | 9 Geo. 2. c. 34 | 20 May 1736 |
An Act for enabling His Majesty to borrow any Sum or Sums of Money, not exceeding Six Hundred Thousand Pounds, to be charged upon the Surplusses, Excesses, or Overplus-monies, commonly called the Sinking Fund, redeemable by Parliament; and for the further Disposition of the said Fund, by paying off One Million of South Sea Annuities; and for appropriating the Supplies granted in this Session of Parliament. (Repealed by Statute Law Revision Act 1870 (33 & 34 Vict. c. 69))
| Offences Against Customs and Excise Laws Act 1735 (repealed) | 9 Geo. 2. c. 35 | 20 May 1736 |
An Act for indemnifying Persons who have been guilty of Offences against the Laws made for securing the Revenues of Customs and Excise; and for enforcing those Laws for the future. (Repealed by Customs Law Repeal Act 1825 (6 Geo. 4. c. 105))
| Charitable Uses Act 1735 or the Mortmain Act 1735 (repealed) | 9 Geo. 2. c. 36 | 20 May 1736 |
An Act to restrain the Dispositions of Lands, whereby the same become unalienable. (Repealed by Mortmain and Charitable Uses Act 1888 (51 & 52 Vict. c. 42) and Charities Act 1960 (8 & 9 Eliz. 2. c. 58))
| Manufacture of Sail Cloth Act 1735 (repealed) | 9 Geo. 2. c. 37 | 20 May 1736 |
An Act for further encouraging and regulating the Manufacture of British Sail Cloth; and for the more effectual securing the Duties now payable on Foreign Sail Cloth imported into this Kingdom. (Repealed by Statute Law Revision Act 1867 (30 & 31 Vict. c. 59))
| Corrupt Practices at Elections Act 1735 (repealed) | 9 Geo. 2. c. 38 | 20 May 1736 |
An Act to explain and amend so much of an Act, made in the Second Year of His present Majesty's Reign, intituled, "An Act for the more effectual preventing Bribery and Corruption in the Elections of Members to serve in Parliament," (Note: Corrupt Practices at Parliamentary Elections Act 1728 (2 Geo. 2. c. 24)) as relates to the commencing and carrying on of Prosecutions grounded upon the said Act. (Repealed by Statute Law Revision Act 1953 (2 & 3 Eliz. 2. c. 5))
| Northern Roads, London Act 1735 (repealed) | 9 Geo. 2. c. 39 | 5 May 1736 |
An Act for making more effectual Two Acts of Parliament, One of the Tenth Year of the Reign of Her late Majesty Queen Anne, (Note: Highgate and Chipping Barnet Road Act 1711 (10 Ann. c. 4)) and the other of the Seventh Year of the Reign of His late Majesty King George the First, (Note: Highgate and Chipping Barnet Road Act 1720 (7 Geo. 1. St. 1. c. 18)) for repairing the Road from Highgate Gatehouse, in the County of Middlesex, to Barnet Blockhouse, in the County of Hertford; and the Road from The Bear Inn in Hadley, to The Angel in Enfield Chace; and for amending Cane Wood Lane, leading from Highgate to Hampstead, in the said County of Middlesex. (Repealed by Highgate and South Mimms Road Act 1815 (55 Geo. 3. c. l))

=== Private acts ===
| Short title | Citation | Royal assent |
Long title
| Harrison's Name Act 1735 | 9 Geo. 2. c. 1 Pr. | 19 February 1736 |
An Act to enable John Harrison, an Infant, now called John Newport, and the Heirs of his Body, to take and use the Surname of Newport, pursuant to the Directions of Henry late Earl of Bradford, deceased.
| Naturalization of Peter Callifies, Zachary Cahuac and Others Act 1735 | 9 Geo. 2. c. 2 Pr. | 19 February 1736 |
An Act for naturalizing Peter Callifies and Zachary Cahuac.
| Lutley's Name Act 1735 | 9 Geo. 2. c. 3 Pr. | 24 March 1736 |
An Act to enable Bartholomew Richard Barneby Esquire, otherwise Lutley, and the Issue of his Body, to take upon him and them the Surname of Barneby, pursuant to the Will of John Barneby Esquire, deceased.
| Naturalization of Henry Lys and Frederick Metzner Act 1735 | 9 Geo. 2. c. 4 Pr. | 24 March 1736 |
An Act for naturalizing Henry Lys and Frederick Ludovick Metzner.
| Earl Cowper's Estate Act 1735 | 9 Geo. 2. c. 5 Pr. | 5 May 1736 |
An Act for settling the Estate of William late Earl Cowper, deceased, to the Uses, and for the Purposes, mentioned in certain Articles of Agreement made between William now Earl Cowper and his Brother, and the Issue of Spencer Cowper Esquire, deceased.
| Enabling Harry Earl of Sanford and son and heir apparent Harry Lord Gray to make a marriage settlement for the latter despite his minority. | 9 Geo. 2. c. 6 Pr. | 5 May 1736 |
An Act to enable Harry Earl of Stamford and Harry Gray Esquire, commonly called Lord Gray, Son and Heir Apparent of the said Earl, to make a Settlement upon the Marriage of the said Lord Gray, notwithstanding his Infancy.
| Earl of Pembroke and Montgomery's Estate Act 1735 | 9 Geo. 2. c. 7 Pr. | 5 May 1736 |
An Act for empowering the Trustees named in the Will of Thomas late Earl of Pembroke and Montgomery to lay out the Residue of his Personal Estate in the Purchase of such Lands and Hereditaments as in this Act are mentioned.
| Cavendish's Estate Act 1735 | 9 Geo. 2. c. 8 Pr. | 5 May 1736 |
An Act for discharging the Estate purchased by the Trustees of Charles Cavendish Esquire, commonly called Lord Charles Cavendish, from the Trusts of his Settlement; and for enabling the said Trustees to sell and dispose of the same, for the Purposes therein mentioned.
| Exchange of lands between Sir John Astley and Queen's College, Cambridge. | 9 Geo. 2. c. 9 Pr. | 5 May 1736 |
An Act for exchanging of Lands, between Sir John Astley Baronet, and the President and Fellows of Queen's College, in Cambridge.
| Westminster Abbey Estate Act 1735 | 9 Geo. 2. c. 10 Pr. | 5 May 1736 |
An Act to enable the Dean and Chapter of Saint Peter's, Westminster, to convey a Piece of Ground, with Three Houses thereon, at Knightsbridge, to a Trustee, for the Contributors to Saint George's Hospital, and their Successors.
| Estates late of Roger Nowell and Roger Nowell his son: making effectual agreements concerning the estates in Lancashire and Yorkshire and vesting them in trustees to be sold for payment of debts. | 9 Geo. 2. c. 11 Pr. | 5 May 1736 |
An Act for making effectual Articles of Agreement, touching the Estates late of Roger Nowell the Elder, of Read, in the County of Lancaster, Esquire, and Roger Nowell his Son, lying in the same County, and in the County of York; and vesting the said Estates in Trustees, to be sold, for the Payment of Debts, and other Purposes therein mentioned.
| Estate of Elizabeth Shore and her daughters: sale of a fourth part of the manor of Plumpton and lands and hereditaments in Sussex and vesting the proceeds in trustees for the same uses. | 9 Geo. 2. c. 12 Pr. | 5 May 1736 |
An Act for Sale of an undivided Fourth Part of the Manor of Plumpton, and certain Lands and Hereditaments, in the County of Sussex, the Estate of Elizabeth Shore and her Daughters; and for vesting the Money arising thereby in Trustees, for the same Uses to which the said Estate now stands settled.
| Vacating grants and settlements on certain lands made by George Parker upon marriage of Francis his son and settling others. | 9 Geo. 2. c. 13 Pr. | 5 May 1736 |
An Act for vacating the Grants and Settlements of certain Manors, Lands, and Tenements made by George Parker Esquire, upon the Marriage of Francis his Son with Jaquete his now Wife; and for settling other Lands instead thereof.
| Bentley's Estate Act 1735 | 9 Geo. 2. c. 14 Pr. | 5 May 1736 |
An Act for vesting the Equity of Redemption of all the Lands of Inheritance and Leasehold Estates late of Charles Bentley Esquire, deceased, lying in the County of Worcester, in Trustees, to be sold, for Payment of his Debts, and making some Provision for Penelope his Widow, and Charles and Penelope, Infants, his Son and Daughter.
| Gee's Estate Act 1735 | 9 Geo. 2. c. 15 Pr. | 5 May 1736 |
An Act for vesting the Estate of William Gee Esquire in Trustees, to settle the same, pursuant to an Agreement made previous to his Marriage with Elizabeth his Wife, Daughter of Roger Talbot Esquire.
| Bank's Will Act 1735 | 9 Geo. 2. c. 16 Pr. | 5 May 1736 |
An Act for explaining the Will of Joseph Banks Esquire, deceased; and for empowering several Persons claiming under the said Will to make Jointures and Leases, in such Manner as is therein mentioned.
| Alderminster Inclosure Act 1735 | 9 Geo. 2. c. 17 Pr. | 5 May 1736 |
An Act for enclosing and dividing the Common Field called Alderminster Common Field, Common Pastures, and other Common Grounds, in the Parish of Alderminster, in the County of Worcester.
| Ixworth Inclosure Act 1735 | 9 Geo. 2. c. 18 Pr. | 5 May 1736 |
An Act for dividing and enclosing the Common Field and Plots of Commonable Lands, and for stinting the Common or Heath, in the Manor of Ixworth, within the Parish of Ixworth, in the County of Suffolk.
| Old Alresford Inclosure Act 1735 | 9 Geo. 2. c. 19 Pr. | 5 May 1736 |
An Act for dividing and enclosing certain Commons and Waste Grounds, called Stankam and Soldridge Commons, in the Parish of Old Alresford, in the County of Southampton.
| Herbert's Name Act 1735 | 9 Geo. 2. c. 20 Pr. | 5 May 1736 |
An Act to enable Charles Herbert Esquire, now called Charles Sheffield, and his Issue, to take and use the Surname of Sheffield, pursuant to the Will of John late Duke of Buckinghamshire and Normanby, deceased.
| Pyndar's Name Act 1735 | 9 Geo. 2. c. 21 Pr. | 5 May 1736 |
An Act to enable Reginald Lygon Esquire, otherwise Pyndar, and the Heirs Male of his Body, to take upon him and them the Surname and Arms of Lygon, pursuant to the Settlement of William Lygon Esquire, deceased.
| Portman's Name Act 1735 | 9 Geo. 2. c. 22 Pr. | 5 May 1736 |
An Act to enable William Berkeley Esquire, now called William Portman, and his Issue Male, to take and use the Surname of Portman only.
| Kendall's Name Act 1735 | 9 Geo. 2. c. 23 Pr. | 5 May 1736 |
An Act to enable Robert Kendall Esquire, now called Robert Cater, and his Issue, to take and use the Surname and Arms of Cater.
| Shales's Name Act 1735 | 9 Geo. 2. c. 24 Pr. | 5 May 1736 |
An Act to enable John Shales, commonly called John Barrington, and the Heirs of his Body, to take and use the Surname of Barrington, pursuant to a Settlement made by Sir Charles Barrington Baronet, deceased.
| Smith's Name Act 1735 | 9 Geo. 2. c. 25 Pr. | 5 May 1736 |
An Act to enable George Allgood Esquire, lately called George Smith, and the Heirs Male of his Body, to take and use the Surname of Allgood only, pursuant to the Will of George Allgood Gentleman, deceased.
| Phillips's Name Act 1735 | 9 Geo. 2. c. 26 Pr. | 5 May 1736 |
An Act to enable Robert Phillips Esquire and his Issue Male to take and use the Surname of Lee, pursuant to the Will of Robert Lee Esquire, deceased.
| Gilbert's Name Act 1735 | 9 Geo. 2. c. 27 Pr. | 5 May 1736 |
An Act to enable John Gilbert Esquire and the Heirs Male of his Body to take and use the Surname and Arms of Cooper, pursuant to the Will of John Cooper of Thurgarton Esquire, deceased.
| John Sinclair Restitution Act 1735 | 9 Geo. 2. c. 28 Pr. | 5 May 1736 |
An Act to enable John Sinclair, Eldest Son of Henry late Lord Sinclair, deceased, to sue or maintain any Action or Suit, notwithstanding his Attainder; and to remove any Disability in him, by reason of his said Attainder, to take or inherit any Real or Personal Estate that may or shall hereafter descend or come to him.
| William Murray Restitution Act 1735 | 9 Geo. 2. c. 29 Pr. | 5 May 1736 |
An Act to enable William Murray to sue or maintain any Action or Suit, notwithstanding his Attainder; and to remove any Disability in him, by reason of his said Attainder, to take or inherit any Real or Personal Estate that may have descended or come to him since His late Majesty's most Gracious Pardon, dated the 20th of July in the 7th Year of His Reign, or that shall hereafter descend or come to him.
| Felthusen's Naturalization Act 1735 | 9 Geo. 2. c. 30 Pr. | 5 May 1736 |
An Act for naturalizing Friedrich Felthusen.
| Making effectual an agreement between Alan Viscount Midleton and his four nieces, securing payment agreed to them of £10,000 and making good agreements in his marriage articles. | 9 Geo. 2. c. 31 Pr. | 20 May 1736 |
An Act for making effectual what has been agreed between Alan Lord Viscount Middleton in the Kingdom of Ireland, and his Four Nieces; and for the securing the Payment of Ten Thousand Pounds agreed to be paid them; and to enable him to make good the Agreements in his Marriage Articles.
| Enabling John Cooke to take the name Freeman, pursuant to the will of William Freeman, and enabling him to make leases of the estates devised by the said will. | 9 Geo. 2. c. 32 Pr. | 20 May 1736 |
An Act to enable John Freeman Esquire, heretofore called John Cooke, and his Heirs, to take and use the Surname of Freeman, pursuant to the Will of William Freeman Esquire, deceased; and also to empower the said John Freeman and others to make Leases of the Estates devised by the said Will.
| Enabling the guardians and trustees of Samuel Pitt (an infant) to compound with Samuel Pitt, merchant, for a sum agreed to the infant by the Court of Chancery. | 9 Geo. 2. c. 33 Pr. | 20 May 1736 |
An Act to enable the Guardians and Trustees of Samuel Pitt, an Infant, to compound with Samuel Pitt Merchant, for a Sum of Money decreed to the said Infant by the Court of Chancery.
| Vaux's Estate Act 1735 | 9 Geo. 2. c. 34 Pr. | 20 May 1736 |
An Act for Sale of Part of the Estate late of Thomas Vaux Esquire, deceased, for discharging his Debts and Encumbrances.
| West Stafford cum Froom Bellet Inclosure Act 1735 | 9 Geo. 2. c. 35 Pr. | 20 May 1736 |
An Act for enclosing and dividing the Common Fields and Common Grounds, in the Parish of West Stafford cum Froom Bellett, in the County of Dorset.
| Vesting in John Sallom a reversion in fee of lands and hereditaments in Lancashire forfeited by Gabriel Hesketh, attainted of High Treason. | 9 Geo. 2. c. 36 Pr. | 20 May 1736 |
An Act for vesting in John Sallom Gentleman and his Heirs a Reversion in Fee of Lands and Hereditaments, therein mentioned, in the County of Lancaster, forfeited by Gabriel Hesketh, attainted of High Treason.
| Edward Randolph's Debt Act 1735 | 9 Geo. 2. c. 37 Pr. | 20 May 1736 |
An Act to enable the Commissioners of the Treasury, or the Lord High Treasurer, for the Time being, to compound with Edward Randolph, late of London, Merchant, and his Sureties, a Debt due to the Crown, for Customs for Tobacco.
| Naturalization of David Purry and John Merle Act 1735 | 9 Geo. 2. c. 38 Pr. | 20 May 1736 |
An Act for naturalizing David Purry and John Anthony Merle.
| Reessen's Naturalization Act 1735 | 9 Geo. 2. c. 39 Pr. | 20 May 1736 |
An Act for naturalizing John Reessen.

=== Sources ===
- Pickering, Danby, ed. (1765). "Anno nono Georgii II". The Statutes at Large. Vol. 17: From the Ninth to the 15th Year of King George II. Cambridge: Joseph Bentham. pp. 1–89 – via Internet Archive.
- Pickering, Danby, ed. (1765). "Anno nono Georgii II". The Statutes at Large. Vol. 17: From the Ninth to the 15th Year of King George II. Cambridge: Joseph Bentham. pp. 1–89 – via Google Books.
- Journals of the House of Commons. Vol. 22. London: His Majesty's Stationery Office. 1803. pp. 496–718 – via Google Books.
- Chronological Table of and Index to the Statutes. Vol. 1: To the End of the Session 59 Vict. Sess. 2 (1895) (13th ed.). London: Her Majesty's Stationery Office. 1896. pp. 103–104 – via Google Books.

== See also ==
- List of acts of the Parliament of Great Britain
