= List of acts of the Parliament of Great Britain from 1731 =

This is a complete list of acts of the Parliament of Great Britain for the year 1731.

For acts passed until 1707, see the list of acts of the Parliament of England and the list of acts of the Parliament of Scotland. See also the list of acts of the Parliament of Ireland.

For acts passed from 1801 onwards, see the list of acts of the Parliament of the United Kingdom. For acts of the devolved parliaments and assemblies in the United Kingdom, see the list of acts of the Scottish Parliament, the list of acts of the Northern Ireland Assembly, and the list of acts and measures of Senedd Cymru; see also the list of acts of the Parliament of Northern Ireland.

The number shown after each act's title is its chapter number. Acts are cited using this number, preceded by the year(s) of the reign during which the relevant parliamentary session was held; thus the Union with Ireland Act 1800 is cited as "39 & 40 Geo. 3. c. 67", meaning the 67th act passed during the session that started in the 39th year of the reign of George III and which finished in the 40th year of that reign. Note that the modern convention is to use Arabic numerals in citations (thus "41 Geo. 3" rather than "41 Geo. III"). Acts of the last session of the Parliament of Great Britain and the first session of the Parliament of the United Kingdom are both cited as "41 Geo. 3".

Acts passed by the Parliament of Great Britain did not have a short title; however, some of these acts have subsequently been given a short title by acts of the Parliament of the United Kingdom (such as the Short Titles Act 1896).

Before the Acts of Parliament (Commencement) Act 1793 came into force on 8 April 1793, acts passed by the Parliament of Great Britain were deemed to have come into effect on the first day of the session in which they were passed. Because of this, the years given in the list below may in fact be the year before a particular act was passed.

== 5 Geo. 2 ==
The fifth session of the 7th Parliament of Great Britain, which met from 13 January 1732 until 1 June 1732.

This session was also traditionally cited as 5 G. 2.

=== Public acts ===
Short title	Citation	Royal assent
Long title
Taxation Act 1731 (repealed)	5 Geo. 2. c. 1	25 February 1732
An Act for continuing the Duties upon Malt, Mum, Cyder, and Perry, in that Part of Great Britain called England; and for granting to His Majesty certain Duties upon Malt, Mum, Cyder, and Perry, in that Part of Great Britain called Scotland, for the Service of the Year One Thousand Seven Hundred and Thirty-two. (Repealed by Statute Law Revision Act 1867 (30 & 31 Vict. c. 59))
Mutiny Act 1731 (repealed)	5 Geo. 2. c. 2	20 March 1732
An Act for punishing Mutiny and Desertion; and for the better Payment of the Army and their Quarters. (Repealed by Statute Law Revision Act 1867 (30 & 31 Vict. c. 59))
Charitable Corporation Frauds Act 1731 (repealed)	5 Geo. 2. c. 3	20 March 1732
An Act to encourage and compel George Robinson Esquire and John Thomson to appear, and produce the Books, and discover the Effects, of the Charitable Corporation for Relief of industrious Poor, by assisting them with small Sums upon Pledges, at legal Interest; and to be examined thereupon at the Times and Places therein mentioned. (Repealed by Statute Law Revision Act 1948 (11 & 12 Geo. 6. c. 62))
Church at Woolwich Act 1731 (repealed)	5 Geo. 2. c. 4	20 March 1732
An Act for re-building the Parish Church of Woolwich, in the County of Kent, as One of the Fifty new Churches directed to be built by Two Acts of Parliament, One made in the Ninth, (Note: New Churches in London and Westminster Act 1710 (9 Ann. c. 17)) and the other in the Tenth, (Note: Churches in London and Westminster Act 1711 (10 Ann. c. 20)) Year of the Reign of Her late Majesty Queen Anne. (Repealed by Statute Law (Repeals) Act 2013 (c. 2))
Land Tax Act 1731 (repealed)	5 Geo. 2. c. 5	3 April 1732
An Act for granting an Aid to His Majesty, by a Land Tax, to be raised in Great Britain, for the Service of the Year One Thousand Seven Hundred and Thirty-two. (Repealed by Statute Law Revision Act 1867 (30 & 31 Vict. c. 59))
Salt Duties Act 1731 (repealed)	5 Geo. 2. c. 6	3 April 1732
An Act for reviving the Duties on Salt, for the Term therein mentioned. (Repealed by Statute Law Revision Act 1867 (30 & 31 Vict. c. 59))
Recovery of Debts in American Plantations Act 1731 or the Debt Recovery Act 1732 (repealed)	5 Geo. 2. c. 7	3 April 1732
An Act for the more easy Recovery of Debts, in His Majesty's Plantations and Colonies in America. (Repealed by Statute Law Revision Act 1887 (50 & 51 Vict. c. 59))
Lombs's Silk Engines Act 1731 (repealed)	5 Geo. 2. c. 8	3 April 1732
An Act for providing a Recompence to Sir Thomas Lombe, for discovering and introducing the Arts of making and working the Three Capital Italian Engines for making Organzine Silk; and for preserving the Invention for the Benefit of this Kingdom. (Repealed by Statute Law Revision Act 1948 (11 & 12 Geo. 6. c. 62))
Importation Act 1731 (repealed)	5 Geo. 2. c. 9	3 April 1732
An Act to explain an Act, made in the last Session of Parliament, intituled, "An Act for importing, from His Majesty's Plantations in America, directly into Ireland, Goods not enumerated in any Act of Parliament," (Note: Importation Act 1730 (4 Geo. 2. c. 15)) so far as the said Act relates to the Importation of Foreign Hops into Ireland. (Repealed by Statute Law Revision Act 1867 (30 & 31 Vict. c. 59))
Manchester Roads Act 1731 (repealed)	5 Geo. 2. c. 10	1 June 1732
An Act for repairing and amending the Road leading from the Town of Manchester, in the County Palatine of Lancaster, through the Town of Ashton under Line, and the Parish of Mottram Longdendale; and from thence to Salter's Brook, in the County Palatine of Chester. (Repealed by Manchester to Chester Roads Act 1793 (33 Geo. 3. c. 139))
Scarborough Harbour Act 1731 (repealed)	5 Geo. 2. c. 11	1 June 1732
An Act to enlarge the Pier and Harbour of Scarborough, in the County of York. (Repealed by Scarborough Harbour Act 1843 (6 & 7 Vict. c. xl))
Corn Act 1731 (repealed)	5 Geo. 2. c. 12	1 June 1732
An Act for amending and making more effectual an Act made in the First Year of the Reign of King James the Second, intituled, "An additional Act for the Improvement of Tillage." (Note: Tillage Act 1685 (1 Ja. 2. c. 19)) (Repealed by Importation and Exportation (No. 2) Act 1791 (31 Geo. 3. c. 30) (Note: Incorrectly cited as "31 Geo. 2. c. 30" in the Chronological Table of the Statutes.))
Parton Harbour, Cumberland Act 1731	5 Geo. 2. c. 13	1 June 1732
An Act for enlarging the Term granted by an Act made in the Eleventh Year of the Reign of His late Majesty King George the First, (Note: Parton Harbour Act 1724 (11 Geo. 1. c. 16)) for re-building the Pier and Harbour of Parton, in the County of Cumberland.
Tiverton (Rebuilding After the Fire) Act 1731	5 Geo. 2. c. 14	1 June 1732
An Act for the better and more easy re-building of the Town of Tiverton, in the County of Devon; and for determining Differences touching Houses and Buildings burnt down or demolished by reason of the late dreadful Fire there; and for the better preventing Dangers from Fire for the future.
Ouze Navigation Act 1731	5 Geo. 2. c. 15	1 June 1732
An Act for rendering more effectual an Act passed in the Thirteenth Year of the Reign of His late Majesty King George the First, intituled, "An Act for improving the Navigation of the River Ouze, in the County of York." (Note: Ouse Navigation Act 1726 (13 Geo. 1. c. 33))
Blandford Forum (Rebuilding After the Fire) Act 1731	5 Geo. 2. c. 16	1 June 1732
An Act for the better and more easy re-building of the Town of Blandford Forum, in the County of Dorset; and for determining Differences touching Houses and Buildings burnt down or demolished by reason of the late dreadful Fire there.
National Debt Act 1731 (repealed)	5 Geo. 2. c. 17	1 June 1732
An Act for the further Application of the Sinking Fund, by paying off One Million of South Sea Stock; and for appropriating the Supplies granted in this Session of Parliament; and for making forth Duplicates of Exchequer Bills, Lottery Tickets, and Orders, lost, burnt, or otherwise destroyed. (Repealed by Statute Law Revision Act 1870 (33 & 34 Vict. c. 69))
Justices Qualification Act 1731 (repealed)	5 Geo. 2. c. 18	1 June 1732
An Act for the further Qualification of Justices of the Peace. (Repealed by Justices of the Peace Act 1906 (6 Edw. 7. c. 16))
Quarter Sessions Appeal Act 1731 (repealed)	5 Geo. 2. c. 19	1 June 1732
An Act to oblige the Justices of the Peace, at their General or Quarter Sessions, to determine Appeals made to them, according to the Merits of the Case, notwithstanding Defects of Form in the original Proceedings; and to oblige Persons suing forth Writs of Certiorari, to remove Orders made on such Appeals into His Majesty's Court of King's Bench, to give Security to prosecute the same with Effect. (Repealed by Administration of Justice (Miscellaneous Provisions) Act 1938 (1 & 2 Geo. 6. c. 63) and Statute Law Revision Act 1948 (11 & 12 Geo. 6. c. 62))
Pilotage Act 1731 (repealed)	5 Geo. 2. c. 20	1 June 1732
An Act for the better Regulation and Government of Pilots licensed by the Corporation of Trinity House of Deptford Strond, in the County of Kent; and to prevent Mischiefs and Annoyances upon the River of Thames, below London Bridge. (Repealed by Statute Law Revision Act 1867 (30 & 31 Vict. c. 59))
Woollen Manufactures Act 1731 (repealed)	5 Geo. 2. c. 21	1 June 1732
An additional Act for the Encouragement of the Woolen Manufactures of this Kingdom, by the more effectual preventing the unlawful Exportation of the Woolen Manufactures of the Kingdom of Ireland to Foreign Parts. (Repealed by Statute Law Revision Act 1867 (30 & 31 Vict. c. 59))
Hat Act 1731 or the Hat Manufacture Act 1731 or the Hat Act 1732 (repealed)	5 Geo. 2. c. 22	1 June 1732
An Act to prevent the Exportation of Hats out of any of His Majesty's Colonies or Plantations in America; and to restrain the Number of Apprentices taken by the Hatmakers in the said Colonies or Plantations; and for the better encouraging the making of Hats in Great Britain. (Repealed by Statute Law Revision Act 1867 (30 & 31 Vict. c. 59))
Forfeited Estates (Derwentwater Estate) Act 1731 (repealed)	5 Geo. 2. c. 23	1 June 1732
An Act for making void the several Contracts for Sale of the Estate of James late Earl of Derwentwater to William Smith Esquire; and also of the Annuity of Two Hundred Pounds, during the Life of Charles Radcliffe, and the Arrears thereof, to Mathew White Esquire, and the several Conveyances made in Pursuance of the same. (Repealed by Statute Law Revision Act 1948 (11 & 12 Geo. 6. c. 62))
Growth of Coffee Act 1731 (repealed)	5 Geo. 2. c. 24	1 June 1732
An Act for encouraging the Growth of Coffee in His Majesty's Plantations in America. (Repealed by Statute Law Revision Act 1867 (30 & 31 Vict. c. 59))
Equity Procedure Act 1731 (repealed)	5 Geo. 2. c. 25	1 June 1732
An Act for making Process in Courts of Equity effectual, against Persons who abscond, and cannot be served therewith, or who refuse to appear. (Repealed by Contempt of Court Act 1830 (11 Geo. 4 & 1 Will. 4. c. 36))
Bedford Roads Act 1731	5 Geo. 2. c. 26	1 June 1732
An Act for the effectual repairing the Highways between Dunstable and Hockcliffe, in the County of Bedford, by enlarging the Term and Powers granted by Two former Acts, One of the Ninth, (Note: Dunstable Highways Act 1710 (9 Ann. c. 34)) and the other of the Twelfth, (Note: Dunstable Highways Act 1713 (13 Ann. c. 29)) Year of the Reign of Her late Majesty Queen Anne.
Process for Small Debts Act 1731 (repealed)	5 Geo. 2. c. 27	1 June 1732
An Act to explain, amend, and render more effectual, an Act made in the Twelfth Year of the Reign of His late Majesty King George the First, intituled, "An Act to prevent frivolous and vexatious Arrests." (Note: Frivolous Arrests Act 1725 (12 Geo. 1. c. 29)) (Repealed by Statute Law Revision and Civil Procedure Act 1881 (44 & 45 Vict. c. 59))
Greenland Fishery Act 1731 (repealed)	5 Geo. 2. c. 28	1 June 1732
An Act for encouraging the Greenland Fishery. (Repealed by Statute Law Revision Act 1867 (30 & 31 Vict. c. 59))
Trade to East Indies Act 1731 (repealed)	5 Geo. 2. c. 29	1 June 1732
An Act for reviving an Act made in the Fifth Year of the Reign of His late Majesty King George the First, intituled, "An Act for the better securing the lawful Trade of His Majesty's Subjects to and from The East Indies; and for the more effectual preventing all His Majesty's Subjects trading thither under Foreign Commissions." (Note: Trade to the East Indies Act 1718 (5 Geo. 1. c. 21)) (Repealed by Statute Law Revision Act 1867 (30 & 31 Vict. c. 59))
Bankrupts Act 1731 (repealed)	5 Geo. 2. c. 30	1 June 1732
An Act to prevent the committing of Frauds by Bankrupts. (Repealed by Bankruptcy Act 1825 (6 Geo. 4. c. 16))
Charitable Corporation (Claims and Disputes) Act 1731 (repealed)	5 Geo. 2. c. 31	1 June 1732
An Act for appointing Commissioners, for taking, stating, and determining, all the Claims and Demands of the Creditors of the Charitable Corporation for Relief of industrious Poor, by assisting them with small Sums upon Pledges, at legal Interest; and of all Persons claiming any Share or Interest in the Stock or Fund of the said Corporation; and for enabling the said Corporation to name One Person to be an Assignee under the respective Commissions of Bankruptcy awarded against George Robinson and John Thomson; and for enabling the Commissioners acting under the said Commissions of Bankruptcy to proceed, and inquire of the Estates, Goods, and Effects, of the said Bankrupts, and to apply the same; and to oblige John Thomson, Father of the said John Thomson the Bankrupt, to appear before the said Commissioners of Bankruptcy in England. (Repealed by Statute Law Revision Act 1948 (11 & 12 Geo. 6. c. 62))
Sir Robert Sutton, etc., Restrained from Going Abroad Act 1731 (repealed)	5 Geo. 2. c. 32	1 June 1732
An Act to restrain Sir Robert Sutton Knight of the Bath, (Note: Robert Sutton.) Sir Archibald Grant Baronet, (Note: Sir Archibald Grant, 2nd Baronet.) Denis Bond, (Note: Denis Bond.) William Burroughs, Esquires, Richard Woolley, and Thomas Warren, from going out of this Kingdom, for the Space of One Year, and until the End of the then next Session of Parliament; and for discovering their Estates and Effects, and to prevent the transporting or alienating the same; and to oblige William Squire to surrender himself, at a Time and Place mentioned in the Act, and to give Security for his not going out of this Kingdom for the Space of One Year, and until the End of the then next Session of Parliament; and for discovering his Estate and Effects, and to prevent the transporting or alienating the same; and for committing the aforesaid William Burroughs to the Prison of The Fleet, until he shall have complied with the Directions of this Act. (Repealed by Statute Law Revision Act 1948 (11 & 12 Geo. 6. c. 62))
Destruction of Turnpikes, etc. Act 1731 (repealed)	5 Geo. 2. c. 33	1 June 1732
An Act to explain, amend, and render more effectual, an Act passed in the First Year of His present Majesty's Reign, intituled, "An Act for punishing such Persons as shall wilfully and maliciously pull down or destroy Turnpikes for repairing Highways, or Locks, or other Works erected by Authority of Parliament, for making Rivers navigable." (Note: Destruction of Turnpikes, etc. Act 1727 (1 Geo. 2. St. 2. c. 19)) (Repealed by Statute Law Revision Act 1867 (30 & 31 Vict. c. 59))

=== Private acts ===
Short title	Citation	Royal assent
Long title
Lockman's Naturalization Act 1731	5 Geo. 2. c. 1 Pr.	25 February 1732
An Act to naturalize Leonard Lockman Esquire.
Coussmaker's Naturalization Act 1731	5 Geo. 2. c. 2 Pr.	25 February 1732
An Act to naturalize Agnes Coussmaker.
Naturalization of Thomas and Joseph Malan and Others Act 1731	5 Geo. 2. c. 3 Pr.	25 February 1732
An Act to naturalize Thomas Malan, Joseph Malan, and others.
Abingdon's Estate Act 1731	5 Geo. 2. c. 4 Pr.	3 April 1732
An Act for vesting several Manors and Hereditaments, the Estate of Mountague Earl of Abingdon, in the Counties of Wilts, Oxon, Bucks, and Berks, in Trustees, to be sold, for raising Money, to discharge Debts and Incumbrances.
Sale of manors of Kemble and Poole (Wiltshire), late the estate of Henry Poole, deceased.	5 Geo. 2. c. 5 Pr.	3 April 1732
An Act for Sale of the Manors of Kemble and Poole, in the County of Wilts, late the Estate of Henry Poole Esquire, deceased, for the Purposes therein mentioned.
Little Kineton Inclosure Act 1731	5 Geo. 2. c. 6 Pr.	3 April 1732
An Act for exchanging, enclosing, and reducing into Severalty, several Common Fields, Common Meadows, and Waste Grounds, within the Manor and Township of Little Kineton, in the County of Warwick.
Advancing and applying £4000, part of Dame Anne Drake's portion, and leasing of lands in Devon for lives, according to the custom of the county.	5 Geo. 2. c. 7 Pr.	3 April 1732
An Act for advancing and applying Four Thousand Pounds, Part of the Portion of Dame Anne Drake, Wife of Sir Francis Henry Drake Baronet; and for leasing out certain Lands and Hereditaments, in the County of Devon, for Lives, according to the Custom of the Country.
Hyde Park Waters Act 1731	5 Geo. 2. c. 8 Pr.	1 June 1732
An Act for vesting the Conduits, Springs, and Waters, in Hyde Park, in Trustees, for the Benefit of His Majesty.
Exchange of the right of presentation to the rectory of Wimborne Allhallows and vicarage of Loders and uniting the rectories and parishes of Wimborne St. Giles and Wimborne Allhallows (Dorset).	5 Geo. 2. c. 9 Pr.	1 June 1732
An Act for the Exchange of the Right of Presentation to the Rectory of Wimborne Allhallowes and Vicarage of Loders, in the County of Dorset; and for uniting the Rectories and Parishes of Wimborne St. Giles and Wimborne Allhallowes.
Enlargement of Paddington Churchyard (Middlesex) Act 1731	5 Geo. 2. c. 10 Pr.	1 June 1732
An Act for enlarging the Church yard of the Parish of Paddington, in the County of Middlesex.
Enabling Richard Lord Viscount Molesworth and brothers to make leases or grants of land in Dublin.	5 Geo. 2. c. 11 Pr.	1 June 1732
An Act for enabling Richard Lord Viscount Molesworth and his Brothers to make Leases for Lives, or Years determinable upon Lives, renewable for ever, or to make Grants in Fee Farm, of a Piece of Ground in the City of Dublin.
Stanhope's Estate Act 1731	5 Geo. 2. c. 12 Pr.	1 June 1732
An Act for Sale of certain Manors, Woods, Wood-lands, and other Lands and Hereditaments, in the Counties of Bucks, Hertford, and Bedford, Part of the Estate of Sir William Stanhope Knight of the Bath; and for settling other Lands, in the County of Warwick, of greater Yearly Value, to the same Uses; and for other Purposes therein mentioned.
Making effectual an agreement between Sir Ralph Hare and brothers to raise money on part of his entailed estate and settling other lands not entailed in lieu.	5 Geo. 2. c. 13 Pr.	1 June 1732
An Act for making effectual an Agreement between Sir Ralph Hare and his Brothers, for raising Money upon Part of his entailed Estate; and for settling other Lands, not entailed, of greater Value, in Lieu thereof.
Empowering Sir Robert Furnesse to transfer and pay Richard Edgecombe certain government securities and monies and settling lands of equal value upon the same trusts.	5 Geo. 2. c. 14 Pr.	1 June 1732
An Act to empower Sir Robert Furnese Baronet to transfer and pay unto Richard Edgecumbe Esquire certain Government Securities and Money therein mentioned; and for settling Lands, of equal Value, upon the same Trusts.
Gerrard's Estate Act 1731	5 Geo. 2. c. 15 Pr.	1 June 1732
An Act for Sale of Part of the Estate of Sir William Gerard Baronet, a Lunatic, for Payment of his Debts, and other Purposes therein mentioned.
Lambe's Estate Act 1731	5 Geo. 2. c. 16 Pr.	1 June 1732
An Act for vesting Part of the Estate of John Lambe Esquire in Trustees, for raising Money, to discharge several Mortgages and other Debts and Incumbrances therein-mentioned.
Making leases of the estates late of Thomas Strangeways and Elizabeth Duchess of Hamilton (both deceased) and applying the proceeds for purposes mentioned.	5 Geo. 2. c. 17 Pr.	1 June 1732
An Act for making Leases of the Estate late of Thomas Strangeways Esquire, and Elizabeth late Dutchess of Hamilton his Sister (both deceased); and for applying the Money arising thereby, for the Purposes therein mentioned.
Mitchell's Estate Act 1731	5 Geo. 2. c. 18 Pr.	1 June 1732
An Act for Sale of the Estate of Thomas Mitchell deceased, lying in the County of Warwick, for Payment of the Debts charged thereupon; and for making Provision for his Widow and Infant Children.
Swinburne's Estate Act 1731	5 Geo. 2. c. 19 Pr.	1 June 1732
An Act for raising Money, out of the Estate late of Surtees Swinburne Esquire, deceased, for compounding and paying the Portions charged thereon to his Younger Sons William and Robert Swinburne; and for paying the Debts of Cuthbert Swinburne Esquire, deceased.
Abbot's Estate Act 1731	5 Geo. 2. c. 20 Pr.	1 June 1732
An Act for Sale of the Real Estate late of Robert Abbott Esquire, deceased, for discharging his Debts and Incumbrances; and for making a Provision for his Widow and only Son.
Congreve's Estate Act 1731	5 Geo. 2. c. 21 Pr.	1 June 1732
An Act for rectifying some Mistakes in a Settlement made by John Congreve Esquire; and vesting his Seat and Estate in Stretton, in the County of Stafford, in Trustees, to be sold, for the better clearing his Debts, for which his Eldest Son stands engaged; and purchasing another Estate, more suitable to the Occasions of his Family, to be settled in Lieu thereof.
Buswell's Estate Act 1731	5 Geo. 2. c. 22 Pr.	1 June 1732
An Act for vesting certain Lands and Estates, in the Counties of Stafford, Leicester, Rutland, and Northampton, late the Estates of Sir Eusebius Buswell Baronet, deceased, in Trustees, to be sold, for the Payment of his Debts.
Exchange of lands between Henry Bromley and Pembroke Hall, Cambridge.	5 Geo. 2. c. 23 Pr.	1 June 1732
An Act for exchanging of certain Lands, between Henry Bromley Esquire, and the Master, Fellows, and Scholars, of Pembroke Hall, in the University of Cambridge.
Confirming and rendering effectual an agreement made between John West, on behalf of Mary and Frances his daughters, Sir Francis Vivyan and Mary Erisey.	5 Geo. 2. c. 24 Pr.	1 June 1732
An Act to establish and confirm an Agreement made between John West Esquire, on the Behalf of his Daughters Mary West and Frances West, Infants, Sir Francis Vyvyan Baronet, and Mary Erisey; and to render the same effectual.
Francis' Estate Act 1731	5 Geo. 2. c. 25 Pr.	1 June 1732
An Act for charging the settled Estate of John Francis Clerk with the Payment of his Father's Debts and Legacies; and for settling another Estate, of greater Value, to the Uses of his Marriage Settlement.
Mill's Estate Act 1731	5 Geo. 2. c. 26 Pr.	1 June 1732
An Act for vesting Two undivided Fourth Parts of the Manor of Greatham; and of other Lands and Hereditaments, in the County of Sussex, the Estate of Barbara Mill and Frances Mill, Spinsters, in Trustees, to enable them to join in the Sale of the said entire Manor, Lands, and Hereditaments, for raising Portions for them and their Two Sisters.
Gace's Estate Act 1731	5 Geo. 2. c. 27 Pr.	1 June 1732
An Act for selling Part of the Estate of Joseph Gace Esquire, for discharging several Debts and Incumbrances affecting the same.
Morrice's Estate Act 1731	5 Geo. 2. c. 28 Pr.	1 June 1732
An Act for Sale of the Estate of Sir William Morice Baronet, in Padstow, in the County of Cornwall; and for settling another Estate, of better Value, to the same Uses, in Lieu thereof.
Vesting in Mary Hall lands and manors in Bedlington and Chester-le-Street (Durham) for sale and thereby performing trusts mentioned in Anne Hancock's will.	5 Geo. 2. c. 29 Pr.	1 June 1732
An Act to vest in Mary Hall Widow certain Copyhold Lands, in the Manors of Bedlington and Chester en le Street, in the County of Durham, to sell the same, and thereby to perform the Trusts mentioned in the Will of Anne Hancock Widow, deceased.
Lloyd's Estate Act 1731	5 Geo. 2. c. 30 Pr.	1 June 1732
An Act for supplying a Defect in a Conveyance lately made by Charles Lloyd Senior and Sarah his Wife; and Charles Lloyd Junior and Jane his Wife; and for the Sale of certain Lands, in the County of Montgomery, for raising Three Thousand Pounds, and Six Hundred Pounds; and for other Purposes therein mentioned.
Puriton or Pirton (Wiltshire) Inclosure Act 1731	5 Geo. 2. c. 31 Pr.	1 June 1732
An Act for enclosing and dividing a Common Pasture Ground, called Momes Leaze, situate and lying in the Parish of Puriton, alias Pirton, in the County of Wilts.
Staunton Inclosure Act 1731	5 Geo. 2. c. 32 Pr.	1 June 1732
An Act for confirming the Exchanges, Enclosures, and Divisions, of the Common Fields, Common Meadows, Common Grounds, and Commons, within the Parish of Staunton, in the County of Wilts; and for other Purposes therein mentioned.
Enabling the Treasury to compound with Thomas Tomkins, cashier to the late commissioners for licensing hawkers, pedlars and petty chapmen, for an arrear owed to the Crown.	5 Geo. 2. c. 33 Pr.	1 June 1732
An Act to enable the Commissioners of His Majesty's Treasury, or the Lord High Treasurer, for the Time being, to compound with Thomas Tomkyns, Cashier to the late Commissioners for licensing Hawkers, Pedlars, and Petty Chapmen, for an Arrear he stands charged with to the Crown.
Haijman's Naturalization Act 1731	5 Geo. 2. c. 34 Pr.	1 June 1732
An Act to naturalize Nicholas Haijman.
Naturalization of Joseph Guinand, David Dumouchell and Others Act 1731	5 Geo. 2. c. 35 Pr.	1 June 1732
An Act to naturalize Joseph Guinand, David Dumouchell, and others.

=== Sources ===
- Pickering, Danby, ed. (1765). The Statutes at Large. Vol. 16: From the Second to the 9th Year of King George II. Cambridge: Joseph Bentham – via Internet Archive.
- Pickering, Danby, ed. (1765). The Statutes at Large. Vol. 16: From the Second to the 9th Year of King George II. Cambridge: Joseph Bentham. pp. 263–363 – via Google Books.
- Journals of the House of Commons. Vol. 21. London: His Majesty's Stationery Office. 1803. pp. 757–941 – via Google Books.
- Chronological Table of and Index to the Statutes. Vol. 1: To the End of the Session 59 Vict. Sess. 2 (1895) (13th ed.). London: Her Majesty's Stationery Office. 1896. p. 101 – via Google Books.

== See also ==
- List of acts of the Parliament of Great Britain
