= Sunset provision =

Legal measure

In public policy, a sunset provision or sunset clause is a measure within a statute, regulation, or other law that provides for the law to cease to be effective after a specified date, unless further legislative action is taken to extend it. Unlike most laws that remain in force indefinitely unless they are amended or repealed, sunset provisions have a specified expiration date. Desuetude renders a law invalid after long non-use.

== Origin ==
The roots of sunset provisions are laid in Roman law of the mandate, but the first philosophical reference is traced in the laws of Plato. At the time of the Roman Republic, the empowerment of the Roman Senate to collect special taxes and to activate troops was limited in time and extent. Those empowerments ended before the expiration of an electoral office, such as the Proconsul. The rule Ad tempus concessa post tempus censetur denegata is translated as "what is admitted for a period will be refused after the period". The same rules were applied in the Roman emergency legislation. The fundamental principle appeared in several areas of legislation and was later codified in the Codex Iustinianus (10, 61, 1). The principle was broken when Julius Caesar became dictator for life.

== Arguments ==
Sunset provisions have been used extensively throughout legal history. The idea of general sunset provisions was discussed extensively in the late 1970s. Sunset clauses with an effective extension review process have been argued as a safeguard of democracy to ensure emergency provisions, such as state of emergency, remain temporary. An increase in electoral accountability can be achieved with brief reviews resulting in a majority of provisions extended with no or cosmetic modifications and a record who advocates for extending the provisions. Sunset clauses with automatic expiration can reduce legal certainty and circumvent long-term budget constraints and regulatory impact analysis. Experimental regulations can test temporarily new legislative approaches.

== By country ==
=== United States ===
==== Colonial and early state legislatures ====
Sunset provisions were a frequent legislative tool used by the colonial and early state legislatures but would decrease in popularity as the legislatures were institutionalized.

==== Federal level ====
In American federal law parlance, legislation that renews an expired mandate is a reauthorization act or extension act. Extensive political wrangling often precedes reauthorizations of controversial laws or agencies. High-profile examples in American law include:

===== U.S. Constitution =====
Article I, Section 8, which enumerates the powers of Congress, includes a sunset provision for expenditures on “Armies,” but not the Navy:

The Congress shall have Power
[…]
To raise and support Armies, but no Appropriation of Money to that Use shall be for a longer Term than two Years;
To provide and maintain a Navy;
[…]

Article V contains a provision “that no Amendment which may be made prior to the Year One thousand eight hundred and eight shall in any Manner affect the first and fourth Clauses in the Ninth Section of the first Article,” which, by its words, had sunsetted by 1808.

===== Sedition Act of 1798 =====
Part of the Alien and Sedition Acts, the Sedition Act was a political tool used by John Adams and the Federalist Party to suppress opposition. The authors ensured the act would terminate at the end of Adams' term so that it could not be used by Democratic-Republicans against the President's own party.

===== USA PATRIOT Act =====
Under §224 of the USA PATRIOT Act, several of the surveillance portions originally expired on December 31, 2005. These were later renewed, but expired again on March 10, 2006, and were renewed once more in 2010.

Section 102(b)(1), which states, "the civil rights and civil liberties of all Americans, including Arab Americans, Muslim Americans, and Americans from South Asia, must be protected, and that every effort must be taken to preserve their safety" was set to sunset on March 15, 2020. On March 15, 2020, the House of Representatives left the chamber without voting on an extension for the remaining provisions of the act, which sunset the following provisions:

- §201 Wiretapping for terrorism cases
- §202 Wiretapping for computer fraud and abuse
- §203(b) and (d) Sharing of wiretap and foreign intelligence information
- §§204, 206, 207, 214, 215, 218, and 225 Foreign Intelligence Surveillance Act related sections including roving wiretaps
- §209 Warranted seizure of voicemail messages
- §217 Computer trespasser communications
- §220 Nationwide service or warrants for electronic evidence
- §223 Privacy violation civil liability

===== Assault Weapons Ban =====
In 2004, the sunset provision of the 1994 Federal Assault Weapons Ban terminated the law.

===== Budget Act and the Byrd Rule =====
The Congressional Budget Act governs the role of Congress in the budget process. Among other provisions, it affects Senate rules of debate during the budget reconciliation, not least by preventing the use of the filibuster against the budget resolutions. The Byrd rule, named after its principal sponsor, Senator Robert C. Byrd, was adopted in 1985 and amended in 1990 to modify the Budget Act and is contained in section 313. The rule allows Senators to raise a point of order against any provision that is extraneous, where extraneous is defined according to one of several criteria. The definition of extraneous includes provisions that are outside the jurisdiction of the committee or that do not affect revenues nor outlays.

Importantly for sunset provisions, the Byrd rule also defines as extraneous provisions that "...would increase the deficit for a fiscal year beyond those covered by the reconciliation measure." Since the Budget Act says the budget resolution covers at least the four years following the budget year, which is typically the year following the year it was adopted, that is the usual period of time. However, budget resolutions have covered periods as long as ten years, so a reconciliation measure may cover the ten years. This rule has the effect of allowing congress members to raise a point of order against any spending increase or tax cut that does not contain a sunset provision that ends it after five or ten years (conceivably longer). (Otherwise, the provision increases the deficit in a fiscal year after the period covered by the budget resolution.) Appealing or waiving a ruling based on the Byrd rule requires a three-fifths majority of 60 in the Senate. In short, a net effect of the Byrd Rule is to require that any spending increase or tax cut be approved by a majority of 60 if it does not contain a sunset provision. This is intended to assure there is no increase in the deficit after the budget resolution period (though there is an exception that, if the total effect on the deficit in a particular title is to not increase the deficit, the point of order is not triggered). With the sunset provision, only a simple majority is necessary in the budget reconciliation process.

===== Estate tax and other tax cuts of 2001 =====
In the Economic Growth and Tax Relief Reconciliation Act of 2001 the US Congress enacted a phaseout of the federal estate tax over the following 10 years, so that the tax would be completely repealed in 2010. However, while a majority of the Senate favored the repeal, there was not a three-fifths supermajority in favor. Therefore, a sunset provision in the Act reinstates the tax to its original levels (and indeed, all tax cuts contained in the Act) on January 1, 2011, in order to comply with the Byrd Rule. Congress enacted new estate tax levels before the sunset provision was triggered.

==== State level ====
According to the National Conference of State Legislatures, "Colorado, Florida and Alabama passed the first sunset laws in 1976. Texas and 21 other states followed suit in 1977. Eventually, a total of 36 states passed broad sunset statutes"; however, dissatisfaction with the sunset process left only 22 states still using it by 1992.

===== Texas =====
The Texas Sunset provision was established in 1977. Under Texas law, all agencies – except universities, courts, and agencies established by the Texas Constitution – will be abolished on a specific date, generally 12 years after creation or renewal, unless the Texas Legislature passes specific legislation to continue its functions.

A 12-member Sunset Advisory Commission oversees the provisions of the Texas Sunset Act. The commission consisting of five members of the Texas Senate and one member from the general public appointed by the Lieutenant Governor of Texas, and five members of the House and one member from the general public appointed by the Speaker of the Texas House of Representatives. Legislative members are appointed for four-year terms, with half of the commission reappointed on or before September 1 of odd-numbered years, while public members serve two-year terms. The chairman and vice-chairman are appointed by the lieutenant governor and speaker, and the chairmanship alternates between the Senate and House every two years. The commission is assisted by an executive director and staff, who review each agency subject to sunset provisions.

Under the process, each agency must perform for the commission a self-review of its roles and responsibilities, including areas where its duties may overlap those of other agencies and the effect of the agency's abolition on loss of federal funding. The self-review must be completed by September 1 of the odd-numbered year before the year when the agency would be otherwise abolished. The commission must then complete its own review by the following January 1 and hold public hearings by the following February 1.

About 20 to 30 agencies go through the sunset process each legislative session. Constitutionally established agencies are subject to review, but they cannot be abolished under the sunset provisions.

The commission may recommend that an agency be continued in its present form (nearly always with recommendations to the legislature for improvement), consolidated with another agency, or abolished, with its duties either eliminated or transferred to other agencies.

===== Other states =====
Alabama has a similar review process with a more limited number of agencies and a review cycle of every four years.

=== United Kingdom ===
A sunset clause was introduced by the House of Lords to some parts of the Prevention of Terrorism Act 2005; the act was eventually passed without it. Part 5 of the Enterprise and Regulatory Reform Act 2013, "Reduction of legislative burdens", made provision for sunset and review provisions" in secondary legislation, i.e.

- a power to review the effectiveness of the legislation within a specified period or at the end of a specified period
- provision for the legislation to cease to have effect at the end of a specified day or a specified period
- a power to consider whether the objectives which it was the purpose of the legislation to achieve remain appropriate and, if so, whether they could be achieved in another way.

The Coronavirus Act 2020 had a sunset clause provision of two years.

=== Canada ===
In Canada all legislation enacted under Section Thirty-three of the Canadian Charter of Rights and Freedoms (subsection three of the notwithstanding clause) has an implied sunset clause of five years, this being the maximum length legislation enacted under the section may be operative for (unless an earlier date is specified).

The Canadian Anti-Terrorism Act contains a sunset clause that went into effect in February 2007.

Special laws enacted to deal with emergency situations often contain sunset clauses; Quebec's Bill 78 had a sunset clause.

=== Australia ===
In 2005, the Australian Government decided to legislate new Anti-Terrorism laws. These laws have a sunset clause of ten years.

In 2007, the Liberal Democratic Party proposed a constitutional amendment to make sunset clauses compulsory in all legislation that lacks the support of a 75% parliamentary supermajority.

The Legislative Instruments Act 2003 legislates the automatic expiry of most legislative instruments (delegated legislation). Starting in 2015 these legislative instruments must be renewed or they expire automatically.

=== Germany ===
In the German legislation sunset provisions are applied on several federal levels. The German constitution rules a general sunset provision of six months for emergency legislation. Some federal states, e.g., Hesse and North Rhine-Westphalia sporadically add sunset provisions to bills.

=== South Korea ===
A sunset provision can be found in the Corporate Restructuring Promotion Act, which is to facilitate out-of-court workout of insolvent companies. This Act was effective during the period:

i) from January 2001 to December 2005 for the first time; and again
ii) from January 2007 to December 2010.

The Act came into force for the third time on May 19, 2011, and was effective till December 2013. The main content of the Act has been kept intact for the purpose of constant corporate debt restructuring through market functions and promotion of speedy and smooth corporate restructuring, while some minor provisions were modified from time to time.

=== Republic of China ===
The Additional Articles of the Constitution of the Republic of China are a set of temporary articles of the original constitution that change the system of government into one applicable to the circumstances of the areas under the ROC's actual control, most notably replacing the parliamentary system of the original with a semi-presidential system. These articles that have a sunset provision that will terminate them in the event the ROC regains control of Mainland China.

=== New Zealand ===
The Electoral Integrity Act was passed in 1999 to discourage "waka-jumping" in a mixed-member proportional parliamentary system. The amendment expired as scheduled in 2005.
