= Gin Act =

Gin Act may refer to:

- Gin Act 1736
- Gin Act 1743
- Gin Act 1751
