= Beer Street and Gin Lane =

Two prints by William Hogarth

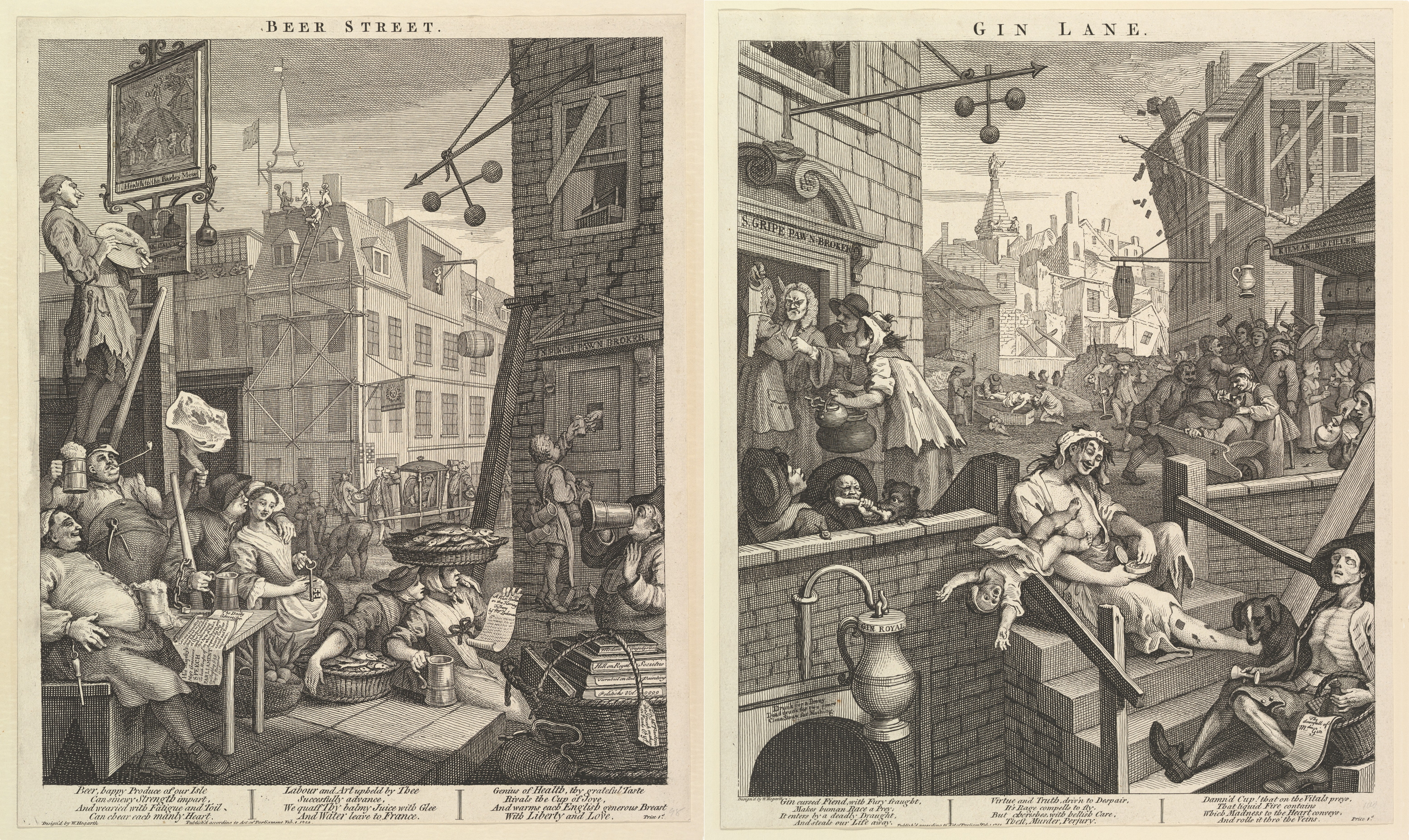
Beer Street and Gin Lane, 1759 versions

Beer Street and Gin Lane are two prints issued in 1751 by English artist William Hogarth in support of what would become the Gin Act. Designed to be viewed alongside each other, they depict the evils of the consumption of gin (then a generic term for grain-based distilled spirits) as a contrast to the merits of drinking beer. At almost the same time and on the same subject, Hogarth's friend Henry Fielding published An Inquiry into the Late Increase in Robbers. Issued together with The Four Stages of Cruelty, the prints continued a movement started in Industry and Idleness, away from depicting the laughable foibles of fashionable society (as he had done with Marriage A-la-Mode) and towards a more cutting satire on the problems of poverty and crime.

On the simplest level, Hogarth portrays the inhabitants of Beer Street as happy and healthy, nourished by the native English small beer and ale, and those who live in Gin Lane as destroyed by their addiction to the foreign spirit of gin; but, as with so many of Hogarth's works, closer inspection uncovers other targets of his satire, and reveals that the poverty of Gin Lane and the prosperity of Beer Street are more intimately connected than they at first appear. Gin Lane shows shocking scenes of infanticide, starvation, madness, decay, and suicide, while Beer Street depicts industry, health, bonhomie, and thriving commerce; but there are contrasts and subtle details which some critics believe allude to the prosperity of Beer Street as the cause of the misery found in Gin Lane.

== Background ==
=== Gin Craze ===
The gin crisis was severe. From 1689 onward the English government encouraged the industry of distilling, as it helped prop up grain prices, which were then low, and increase trade, particularly with England's colonial possessions. Imports of French wine and spirits were banned to encourage the industry at home. Indeed, Daniel Defoe and Charles Davenant, among others, particularly Whig economists, had seen distilling as one of the pillars of British prosperity in the balance of trade. (Both later changed their minds – by 1703 Davenant was warning that "'Tis a growing fad among the common people and may in time prevail as much as opium with the Turks", while by 1727 Defoe was arguing in support of anti-gin legislation.)

In the heyday of the industry there was no quality control whatsoever; gin was frequently mixed with turpentine, and licences for distilling required only the application. When it became apparent that copious gin consumption was causing social problems, efforts were made to control the production of the spirit. The Gin Act 1736 imposed high taxes on sales of gin, forbade the sale of the spirit in quantities of less than two gallons, and required an annual payment of £50 for a retail licence. These measures had little effect beyond increasing smuggling and driving the distilling trade underground.

Various loopholes were exploited to avoid the taxes, including selling gin under pseudonyms such as Ladies' Delight, Bob, Cuckold's Delight, and the none-too-subtle Parliament gin. The prohibitive duty was gradually reduced and finally abolished in 1743. Francis Place later wrote that enjoyments for the poor of this time were limited: They often had only two: "sexual intercourse and drinking", and that "drunkenness is by far the most desired" as it was cheaper and its effects more enduring. By 1750 over a quarter of all residences in St Giles parish in London were gin shops, and most of these also operated as receivers of stolen goods and co-ordinating spots for prostitution.

=== Prints ===
The two prints were issued a month after Hogarth's friend Henry Fielding published his contribution to the debate on gin: An Inquiry into the Late Increase in Robbers, and they aim at the same targets, though Hogarth's work lays more blame for the gin craze on oppression by the governing class and focuses less on the choice of crime as a ticket to a life of ease.

Hogarth advertised their issue in the London Evening Post between 14 and 16 February 1751 alongside the prints of The Four Stages of Cruelty, which were issued the following week:

This Day are publish'd, Price 1 s. each.
Two large Prints, design'd and etch'd by Mr. Hogarth called
BEER-STREET and GIN-LANE
A Number will be printed in a better Manner for the Curious, at 1s. 6d. each.
And on Thursday following will be publish'd four Prints on the Subject of Cruelty, Price and Size the same.
N.B. As the Subjects of these Prints are calculated to reform some reigning Vices peculiar to the lower Class of People, in hopes to render them of more extensive use, the Author has published them in the cheapest Manner possible.
To be had at the Golden Head in Leicester-Fields, Where may be had all his other Works.

The prints, like The Four Stages of Cruelty, had moralising verses composed by Rev James Townley and, on the surface, had a similar intent – to shock the lower classes into reforming. Engraved directly from drawings, no paintings of the two scenes exist, although there are preliminary sketches. By reducing his prices, Hogarth hoped to reach "the lower Class of People", and while one shilling was still prohibitively expensive for most of the poor, the lower prices did allow him to reach a larger market, and more importantly rendered the prints cheap enough to display in taverns and coffee houses before a wider audience. Hogarth also had an eye on his copyright: the lower prices meant there was less chance of the images being reproduced and sold without Hogarth's permission. Although Hogarth had been instrumental in pushing through the Engraving Copyright Act 1734, so much so that the Act is commonly known as "Hogarth's Act", keeping costs down provided further insurance against infringement.

== Gin Lane ==
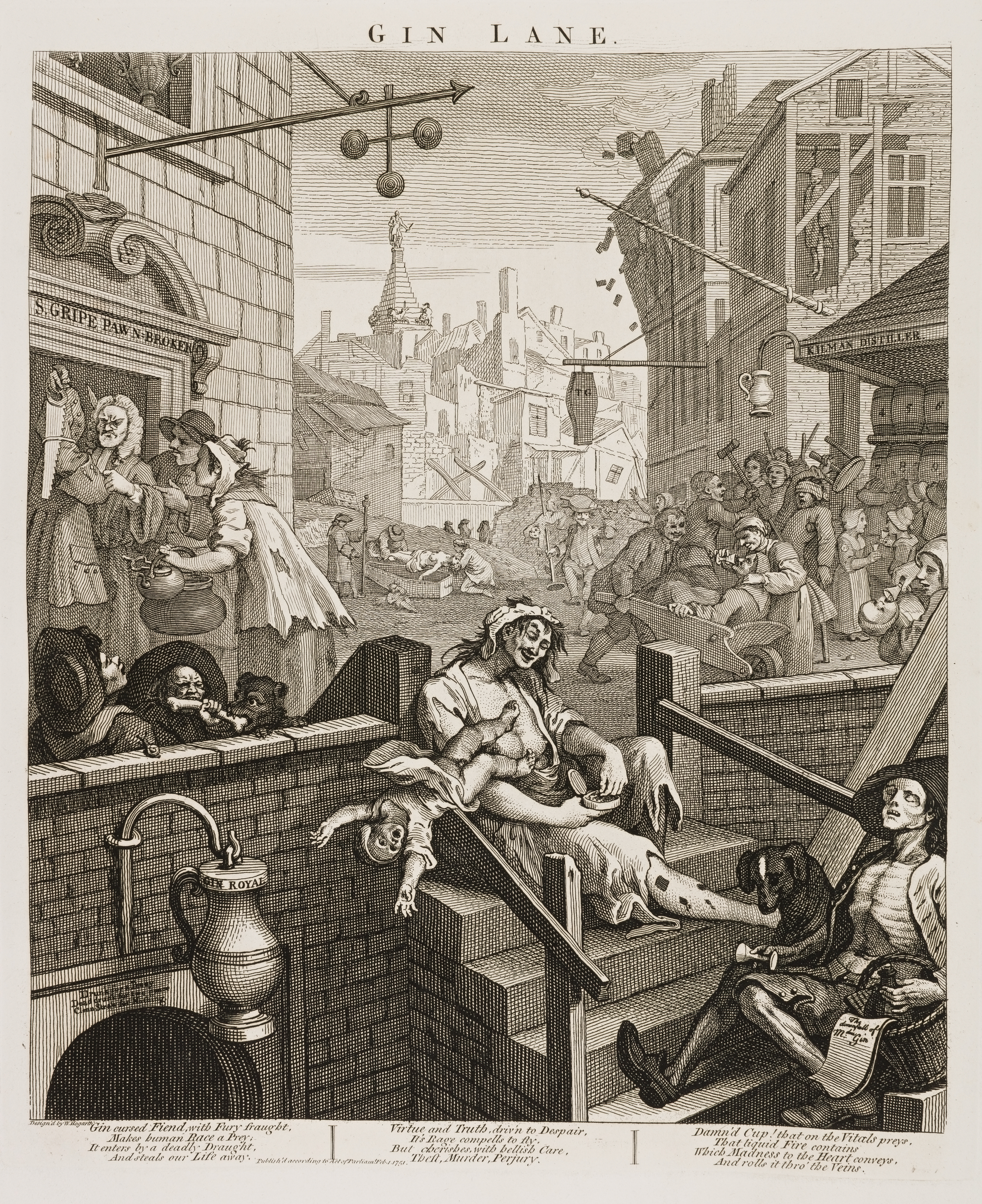
Gin Lane

Set in the parish of St Giles – a notorious slum district that Hogarth depicted in several works around this time – Gin Lane depicts the squalor and despair of a community raised on gin. Desperation, death and decay pervade the scene. The only businesses that flourish serve the gin industry: gin sellers; a distiller (the aptly named Kilman); the pawnbroker where the avaricious Mr Gripe greedily takes the vital possessions (the carpenter offers his saw and the housewife her cooking utensils) of the alcoholic residents of the street in return for a few pennies to feed their habit; and the undertaker, for whom Hogarth implies at least a handful of new customers from this scene alone.

Most shockingly, the focus of the picture is a woman in the foreground, who, addled by gin and driven to prostitution by her habit – as evidenced by the syphilitic sores on her legs – lets her baby slip unheeded from her arms and plunge to its death in the stairwell of the gin cellar below. Half-naked, she has no concern for anything other than a pinch of snuff.^{[a]} This mother was not such an exaggeration as she might appear: in 1734, Judith Dufour reclaimed her two-year-old daughter, Mary, from the workhouse where she had been given a new set of clothes; she then strangled the girl and left her body in a ditch so that she could sell the clothes (for 1s 4d) to buy gin.

In another case, an elderly woman, Mary Estwick, let a toddler burn to death while she slept in a gin-induced stupor. Such cases provided a focus for anti-gin campaigners such as Thomas Wilson, and the image of the neglectful and/or abusive mother became increasingly central to anti-gin propaganda. Sir John Gonson, featured in Hogarth's earlier A Harlot's Progress, turned his attention from prostitution to gin and began prosecuting gin-related crimes with severity.

The gin cellar Gin Royal below advertises its wares with the slogan:

Drunk for a penny
Dead drunk for twopence
Clean straw for nothing

Other images of despair and madness fill the scene: a disturbed man cavorts in the street, beating himself over the head with a pair of bellows while holding a baby impaled on a spike – the dead child's mother rushes from the house screaming in horror; a barber has taken his own life in the dilapidated attic of his barber-shop, ruined because nobody can afford a haircut or shave; on the steps, below the woman who has let her baby fall, a skeletal pamphlet-seller rests, perhaps dead of starvation, as the unsold moralising pamphlet on the evils of gin-drinking The Downfall of Mrs Gin slips from his basket. An ex-soldier, he has pawned most of his clothes to buy the gin in his basket, next to the pamphlet that denounces it. Next to him sits a black dog, a symbol of despair and depression. Outside the distiller a fight has broken out, and a crazed cripple raises his crutch to strike his blind compatriot.

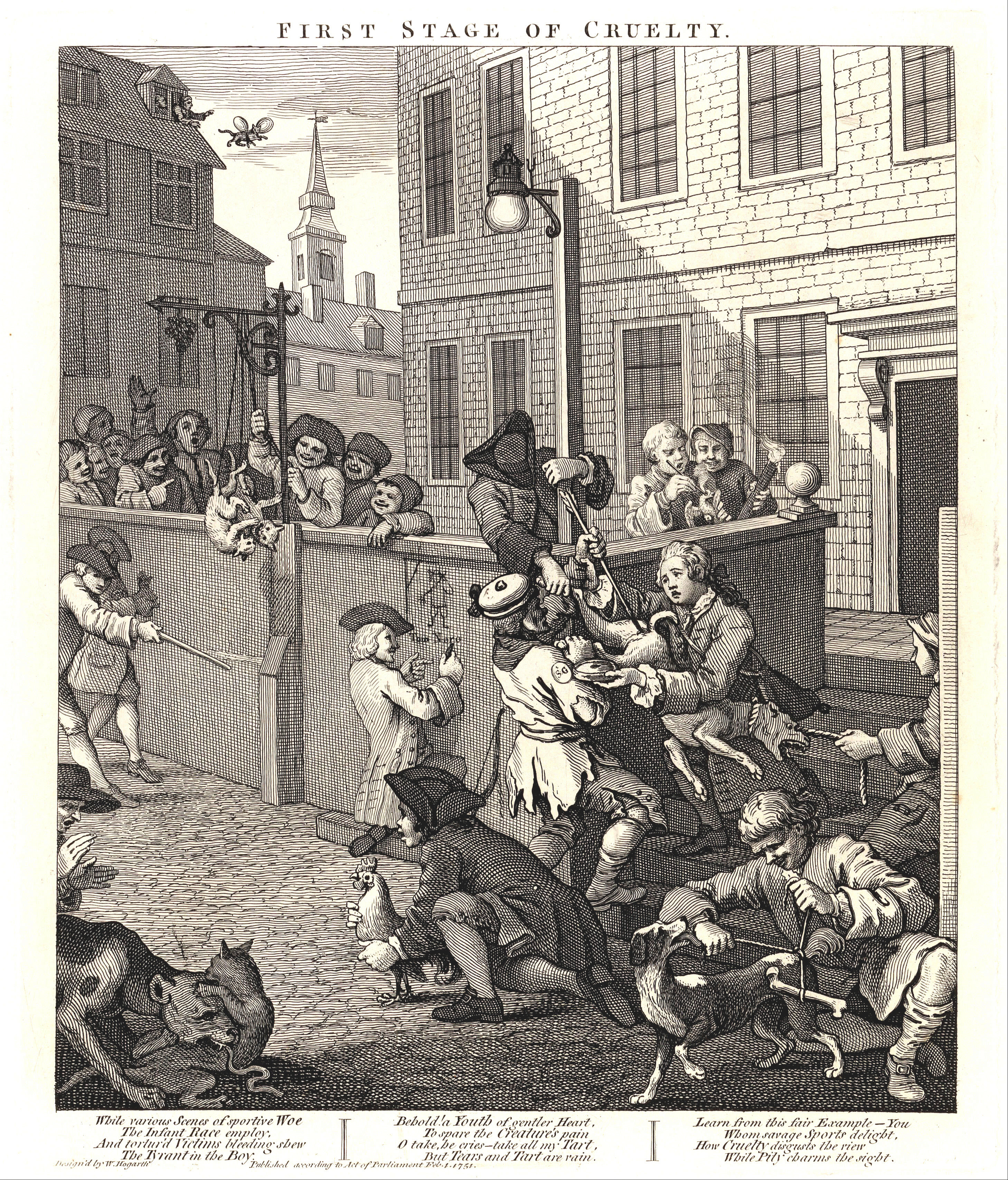
The First Stage of Cruelty: Tom Nero is at the centre torturing a dog.

Images of children on the path to destruction also litter the scene: aside from the dead baby on the spike and the child falling to its death, a baby is quieted by its mother with a cup of gin, and in the background of the scene an orphaned infant bawls naked on the floor as the body of its mother is loaded into a coffin on orders of the beadle. Two young girls who are wards of the parish of St Giles – indicated by the badge on the arm of one of the girls – each take a glass.

Hogarth also chose the slum of St Giles as setting for the first scene of The Four Stages of Cruelty, which he issued almost simultaneously with Beer Street and Gin Lane. Tom Nero, the central character of the Cruelty series, wears an identical arm badge.

In front of the pawnbroker's door a starving boy and a dog fight over a bone, while next to them a girl has fallen asleep; approaching her is a snail, emblematic of the sin of sloth.

In the background the church of St. George's Church, Bloomsbury, can be seen, but it is a faint and distant image, and the picture is composed so the pawnbroker's sign forms a huge corrupted cross for the steeple: the people of Gin Lane have chosen to worship elsewhere.

Townley's verses are equally strong in their condemnation of the spirit:

Gin, cursed Fiend, with Fury fraught,
Makes human Race a Prey.
It enters by a deadly Draught
And steals our Life away.

Virtue and Truth, driv'n to Despair
Its Rage compells to fly,
But cherishes with hellish Care
Theft, Murder, Perjury.

Damned Cup! that on the Vitals preys
That liquid Fire contains,
Which Madness to the heart conveys,
And rolls it thro' the Veins.

== Beer Street ==
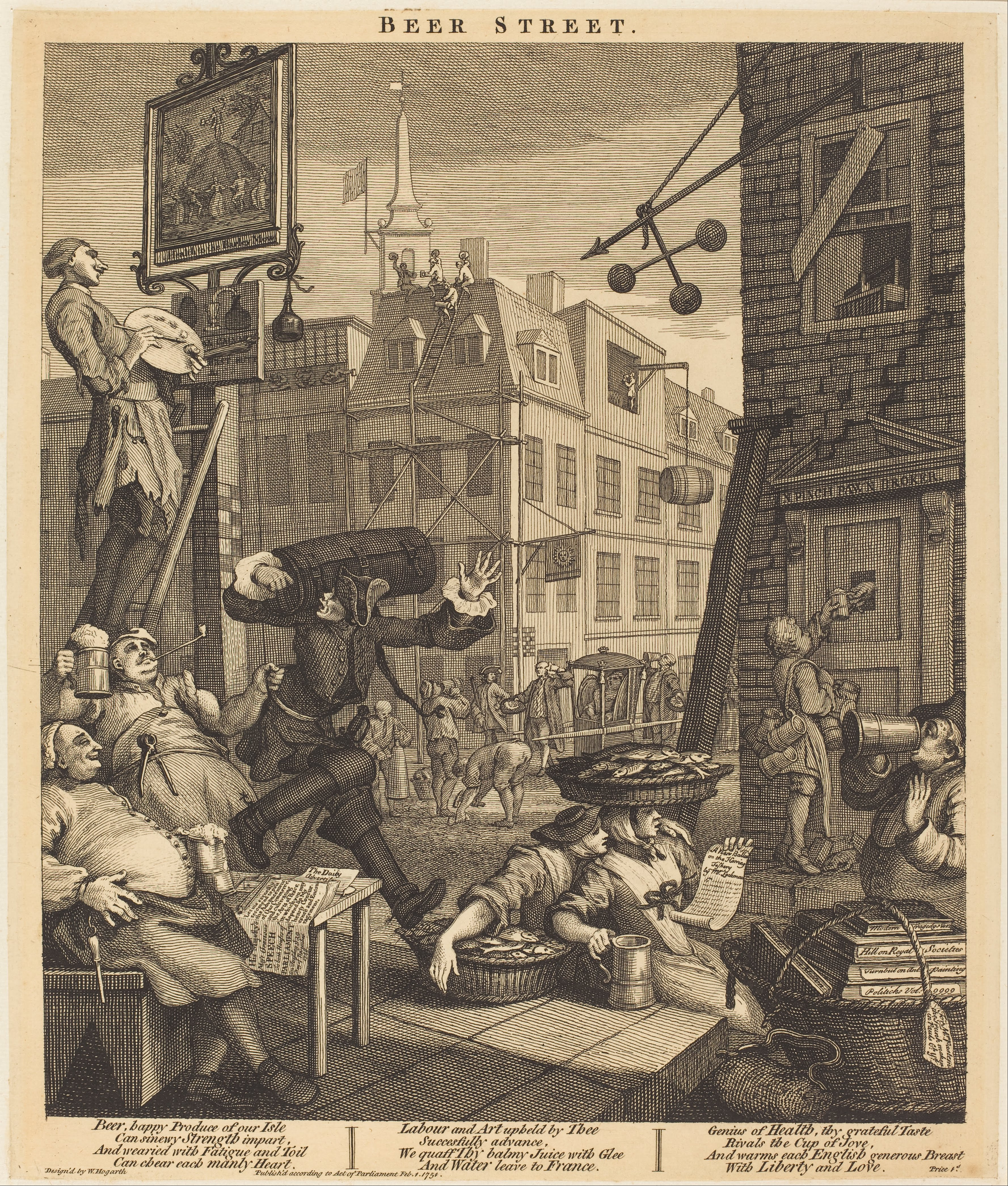
The first and second states of Beer Street featured the blacksmith lifting a Frenchman with one hand. The 1759 reissue replaced him with a joint of meat and added the pavior and housemaid.

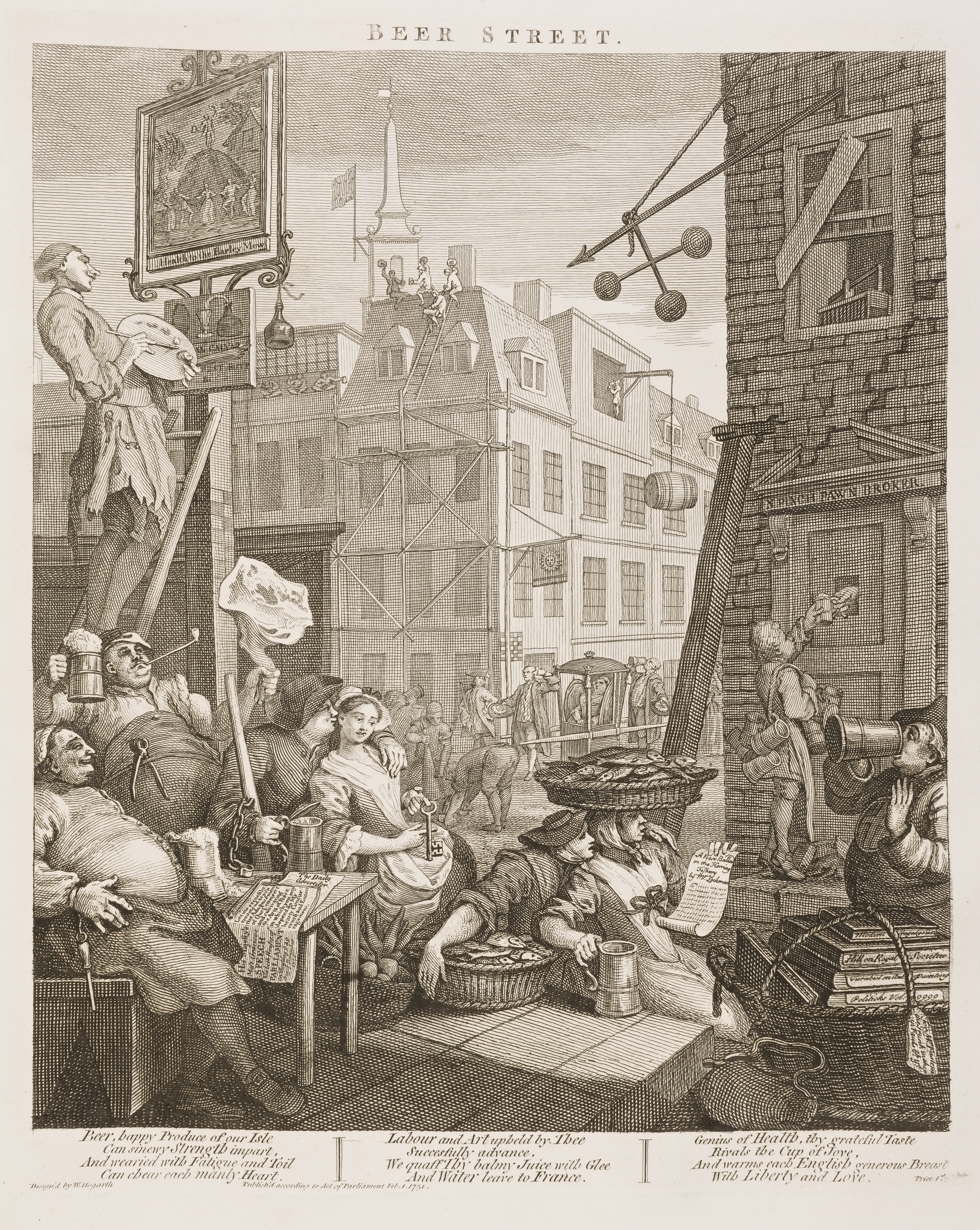
Beer Street 1759 issue

In comparison to the sickly hopeless denizens of Gin Lane, the happy people of Beer Street sparkle with robust health and bonhomie. "Here all is joyous and thriving. Industry and jollity go hand in hand". The only business that is in trouble is the pawnbroker: Mr. Pinch lives in the one poorly maintained, crumbling building in the picture. In contrast to his Gin Lane counterpart, the prosperous Gripe, who displays expensive-looking cups in his upper window (a sign of his flourishing business), Pinch displays only a wooden contraption, perhaps a mousetrap, in his upper window, while he is forced to take his beer through a window in the door, which suggests his business is so unprofitable as to put the man in fear of being seized for debt. The sign-painter is also shown in rags, but his role in the image is unclear.

The rest of the scene is populated with doughty and good-humoured English workers. It is George II's birthday (30 October) (indicated by the flag flying on the church of St Martin-in-the-Fields in the background) and the inhabitants of the scene are no doubt toasting his health. Under the sign of the Barley Mow, a blacksmith or cooper sits with a foaming tankard in one hand and a leg of meat in the other in the later states. In the first states he holds or lifts a Frenchman by the belt. Together with a butcher – his steel hangs at his side – they laugh with the pavior (sometimes identified as a drayman) as he courts a housemaid (the key she holds is a symbol of domesticity).

Ronald Paulson suggests a parallel between the trinity of signs of ill-omen in Gin Lane, the pawnbroker, distiller, and undertaker, and the trinity of English "worthies" here, the blacksmith, pavior, and butcher. Close by a pair of fish-sellers rest with a pint and a porter sets down his load to refresh himself. In the background, two men carrying a sedan chair pause for drink, while the passenger remains wedged inside, her large hoop skirt pinning her in place.^{[b]} On the roof, the builders, who are working on the publican's house above the "Sun" tavern share a toast with the master of a tailor's workshop. In this image it is a barrel of beer that hangs from a rope above the street, in contrast to the body of the barber in Gin Lane.

The inhabitants of both Beer Street and Gin Lane are drinking rather than working, but in Beer Street the workers are resting after their labours – all those depicted are in their place of work, or have their wares or the tools of their trade about them – while in Gin Lane the people drink instead of working. Exceptions to this rule come, most obviously, in the form of those who profit from the vice in Gin Lane, but in Beer Street Hogarth takes the opportunity to make another satirical statement. Aside from the enigmatic sign-painter, the only others engaged in work in the scene are the tailors in an attic. The wages of journeyman tailors were the subject of an ongoing dispute, which was finally settled by arbitration at the 1751 July Quarter Sessions (in the journeymen's favour). Some believe that the tailors serve another purpose, in that Hogarth shows them continuing to toil while all the other inhabitants of the street, including their master, pause to refresh themselves. Much as the tailors are ignored by their master and left to continue working, the occupants of Beer Street are oblivious to the suffering on Gin Lane.

Hogarth also takes the opportunity to comment on artistic pretensions. Tied up together in a basket and destined for use as scrap at the trunk-maker are George Turnbull's On Ancient Painting, Hill on Royal Societies, Modern Tragedies, Polticks vol. 9999 and William Lauder's Essay on Milton's Use and Imitation of the Moderns in Paradise Lost, all examples, real and imagined, of the type of literature that Hogarth thought fabricated connections between art and politics and sought out aesthetic connections that did not exist. Lauder's work was a hoax that painted Milton as a plagiarist.

The picture is a counterpoint to the more powerful Gin Lane – Hogarth intended Beer Street to be viewed first to make Gin Lane more shocking – but it is also a celebration of Englishness and depicts the benefits of being nourished by the native beer. No foreign influences pollute what is a fiercely nationalistic image. An early impression showed a scrawny Frenchman being ejected from the scene by the burly blacksmith who in later prints holds aloft a leg of mutton or ham (Paulson suggests the Frenchman was removed to prevent confusion with the ragged sign-painter).

There is a celebration of English industriousness in the midst of the jollity: the two fish-sellers sing the New Ballad on the Herring Fishery (by Hogarth's friend, the poet John Lockman), while their overflowing baskets bear witness to the success of the revived industry; the King's speech displayed on the table makes reference to the "Advancement of Our Commerce and the cultivating Art of Peace"; and although the workers have paused for a break, it is clear they are not idle. The builders have not left their workplace to drink; the master tailor toasts them from his window but does not leave the attic; the men gathered around the table in the foreground have not laid their tools aside. Townley's patriotic verses further refer to the contrast between England and France:

Beer, happy Produce of our Isle
Can sinewy Strength impart,
And wearied with Fatigue and Toil
Can cheer each manly Heart.

Labour and Art upheld by Thee
Successfully advance,
We quaff Thy balmy Juice with Glee
And Water leave to France.

Genius of Health, thy grateful Taste
Rivals the Cup of Jove,
And warms each English generous Breast
With Liberty and Love!

Paulson sees the images as working on different levels for different classes. The middle classes would have seen the pictures as a straight comparison of good and evil, while the working classes would have seen the connection between the prosperity of Beer Street and the poverty of Gin Lane. He focuses on the well-fed woman wedged into the sedan chair at the rear of Beer Street as a cause of the ruin of the gin-addled woman who is the principal focus of Gin Lane. The free-market economy espoused in the King's address and practised in Beer Street leaves the exponents prosperous and corpulent but at the same time makes the poor poorer. For Paulson the two prints depict the results of a move away from a paternalistic state towards an unregulated market economy. Further, more direct, contrasts are made with the woman in the sedan chair and those in Gin Lane: the woman fed gin as she is wheeled home in a barrow and the dead woman being lifted into her coffin are both mirror images of the hoop-skirted woman reduced to madness and death.

=== Sign-painter ===
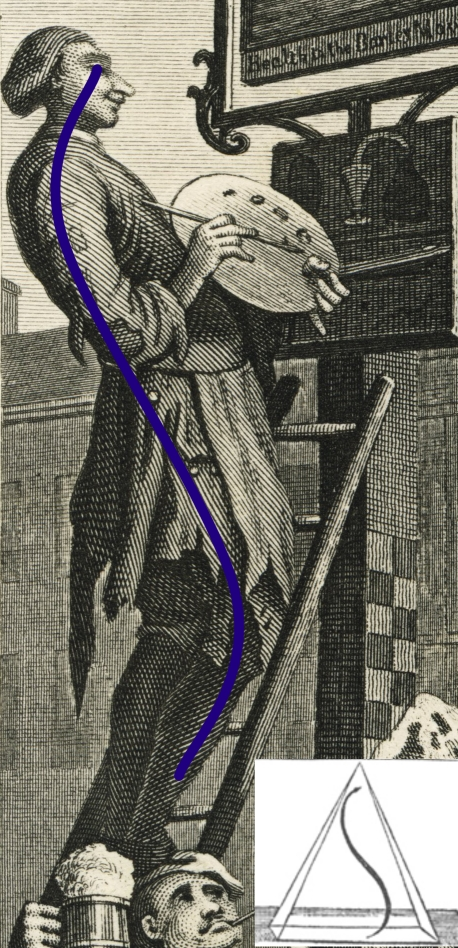
Paulson suggests that sign-painter's stance forms what Hogarth called the "Line of Beauty" (Hogarth's example inset).

The sign-painter is the most difficult figure of the two images to characterise. He appeared in preliminary sketches as another jolly fat archetype of Beer Street—but by the time of the first print, Hogarth had transformed him into a threadbare, scrawny, and somewhat dreamy character who has more in common with the inhabitants of Gin Lane than those who populate the scene below him. Most simply, he may be a subtle aside on the artist's status in society—he carries the palette that Hogarth made his trademark, which appears in several of his self-portraits.

However, he is painting a sign advertising gin, so his ragged appearance could equally reflect the rejection of the spirit by the people of Beer Street. He may also be a resident of Gin Lane, and Hogarth includes him as a connection to the other scene, and as a suggestion that the government's initial policy of encouraging the distillation of gin may be the cause of both Gin Lane's ruin and Beer Street's prosperity. He is ignored by the inhabitants of Beer Street as they ignore the misery of Gin Lane itself. Paulson suggests that he is the lone "beautiful" figure in the scene. The corpulent types that populate Beer Street later featured as representations of ugliness in Hogarth's The Analysis of Beauty, while the painter, as he leans back to admire his work, forms the serpentine shape that Hogarth identified as the "line of beauty".

Thomas Clerk, in his 1812 The Works of William Hogarth, writes that the sign-painter has been suggested as a satire on Jean-Étienne Liotard (called John Stephen by Clerk), a Swiss portrait painter and enameller whom Horace Walpole praised for his attention to detail and realism, mentioning he was "devoid of imagination, and one would think memory, he could render nothing but what he saw before his eyes". In his notes in Walpole's Anecdotes of painting in England, James Dallaway adds a footnote to this statement about Liotard saying, "Hogarth has introduced him, in several instances, alluding to this want of genius." However, Liotard was wearing a full beard, as his self-portrait of 1746 shows.

== Influences ==
Beer Street and Gin Lane with their depictions of the deprivation of the wasted gin-drinkers and the corpulent good health of the beer-drinkers, owe a debt to Pieter Bruegel the Elder's La Maigre Cuisine and La Grasse Cuisine engraved by Pieter van der Heyden in 1563, which shows two meals, one of which overflows with food and is populated by fat diners, while in the other the emaciated guests squabble over a few meagre scraps. Brueghel's compositions are also mirrored in the layers of detail in Hogarth's two images.

Inspiration for these two prints and The Four Stages of Cruelty probably came from his friend Fielding: Hogarth turned from the satirical wit of Marriage A-la-Mode in favour of a more cutting examination of crime and punishment with these prints and Industry and Idleness at the same time that Fielding was approaching the subject in literature. Paulson thinks it likely that they planned the literature and the imagery together as a campaign.

== Reception ==
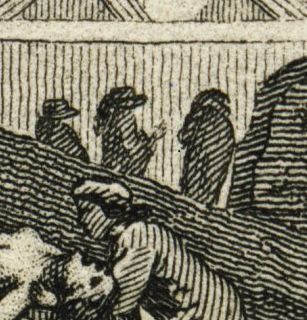
Charles Lamb picked out this detail of a funeral procession in Gin Lane as a mark of Hogarth's skill: "extending of the interest beyond the bounds of the subject could only have been conceived by a great genius".

Charles Knight said that in Beer Street Hogarth had been "rapt beyond himself" and given the characters depicted in the scene an air of "tipsy jollity". Charles Lamb considered Gin Lane sublime, and focused on the almost invisible funeral procession that Hogarth had added beyond the broken-down wall at the rear of the scene as mark of his genius. His comments on Gin Lane formed the centre of his argument to rebut those who considered Hogarth a vulgar artist because of his choice of vulgar subjects:

There is more of imagination in it-that power which draws all things to one,-which makes things animate and inanimate, beings with their attributes, subjects and their accessories, take one colour, and serve to one effect. Every thing in the print, to use a vulgar expression, tells.

Every part is full of "strange images of death". It is perfectly amazing and astounding to look at.

The critic William Hazlitt shared Lamb's view that Hogarth was unfairly judged on the coarseness of his subject matter rather than for his skill as an artist. He singled out Gin Lane and The Enraged Musician as particular examples of Hogarth's imagination and considered that "the invention shewn in the great style of painting is poor in the comparison".

Both John Nichols and Samuel Felton felt that the inclusion of Turnbull's work in the pile of scrap books was harsh, Felton going as far as to suggest Hogarth should have read it before condemning it.

After the Tate Britain's 2007 exhibition of Hogarth's works the art critic Brian Sewell commented that "Hogarth saw it all and saw it straight, without Rowlandson's gloss of puerile humour and without Gainsborough's gloss of sentimentality", but in a piece titled Hogarth the Ham-fisted condemned the heavy-handedness and lack of subtlety that made his images an "over-emphatic rant in his crude insistence on excessive and repetitive detail to reinforce a point".

The reception by the general public is difficult to gauge. Certainly one shilling put the prints out of reach for the poorest people, and those who were pawning their clothes for gin money would not be tempted to buy a print, but there is evidence that Hogarth's prints were in wide circulation even among those that would have regarded them as a luxury, and there are records from the 18th century indicating that his works were used for moral instruction by schoolmasters. At any rate, the Gin Act – passed in no small measure as the result of Fielding and Hogarth's propaganda – was considered a success: gin production fell from 7 million imperial gallons (32 million litres) in 1751 to 4.25 million imperial gallons (19.3 million litres) in 1752, the lowest level for twenty years. By 1757, George Burrington reported, "We do not see the hundreth part of poor wretches drunk in the street". Social changes, quite apart from the Gin Act (among them the increase in the price of grain after a series of bad harvests), were reducing the dependence of the poor on gin, but the problem did not disappear completely: in 1836, Charles Dickens still felt it an important enough issue to echo Hogarth's observations in Sketches by Boz. Like Hogarth, Dickens noted that poverty rather than gin itself was the cause of the misery:

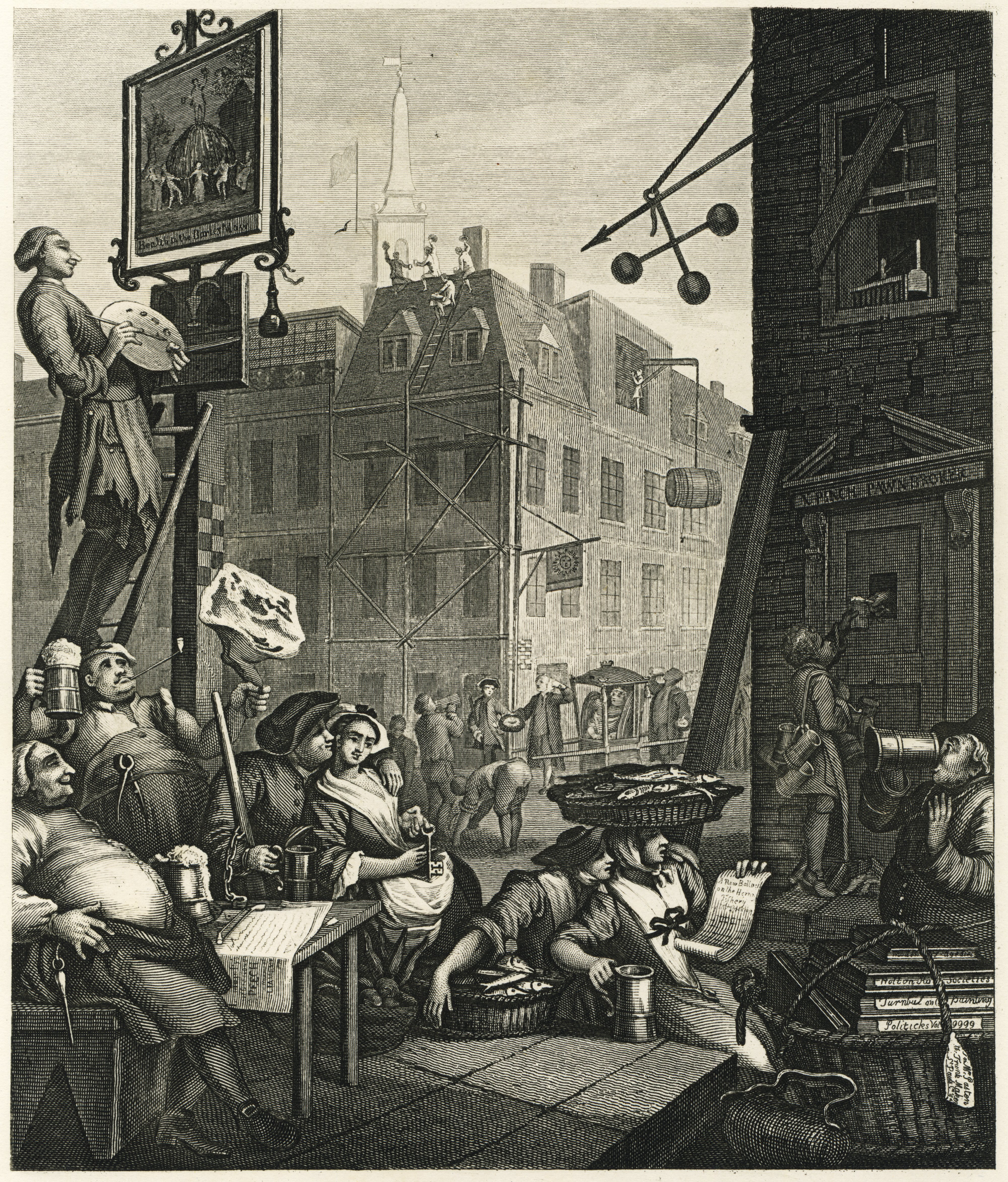
A later engraving of Beer Street by Samuel Davenport (probably for Trusler's Hogarth Moralized) had slight variations from all of the Hogarth states.^{[c]}

Gin-drinking is a great vice in England, but wretchedness and dirt are a greater; and until you improve the homes of the poor, or persuade a half-famished wretch not to seek relief in the temporary oblivion of his own misery, with the pittance that, divided among his family, would furnish a morsel of bread for each, gin-shops will increase in number and splendour.

The vast numbers of prints of Beer Street and Gin Lane and The Four Stages of Cruelty may have generated profits for Hogarth, but the wide availability of the prints meant that individual examples did not generally command high prices. While there were no paintings of the two images to sell, and Hogarth did not sell the plates in his lifetime, variations and rare impressions existed and fetched decent prices when offered at auction. The first (proof) and second states of Beer Street were issued with the image of the Frenchman being lifted by the blacksmith, this was substituted in 1759 by the more commonly seen third state in which the Frenchman was replaced by the pavior or drayman fondling the housemaid, and a wall added behind the sign-painter. Prints in the first state sold at George Baker's sale in 1825 for £2/10s,^{[d]} but a unique proof of Gin Lane with many variations, particularly a blank area under the roof of Kilman's, sold for £15/15s at the same sale.^{[e]} Other minor variations on Gin Lane exist – the second state gives the falling child an older face, perhaps in an attempt to diminish the horror, but these too were widely available and thus inexpensive. Copies of the originals by other engravers, such as Ernst Ludwig Riepenhausen, Samuel Davenport, and Henry Adlard were also in wide circulation in the 19th century.

== Modern versions ==
The iconic Gin Lane, with its memorable composition, has lent itself to reinterpretation by modern satirists. Steve Bell reused it in his political cartoon Free the Spirit, Fund the Party, which added imagery from a Smirnoff vodka commercial of the 1990s to reveal the then Prime Minister, John Major, in the role of the gin-soaked woman letting her baby fall, while Martin Rowson substituted drugs for gin and updated the scene to feature loft conversions, wine bars and mobile phones in Cocaine Lane in 2001. There is also a Pub Street and Binge Lane version, which follows closely both the format and the sentiment of Hogarth's originals. In 2016 the Royal Society for Public Health commissioned artist Thomas Moore to re-imagine Gin Lane to reflect the public health problems of the 21st century. The work is displayed in the Foundling Museum, London.

== See also ==
- List of works by William Hogarth

== Notes ==
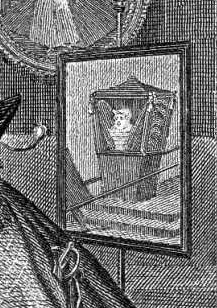
The woman in the sedan chair appeared in Hogarth's earlier Taste in High Life.

a. The snuff may be a reference to Fielding, who was renowned as a heavy snuff taker.

b. This woman appeared as she does here, wedged into a sedan chair with her hoop skirt pinning her in place, as the subject of a painting displayed in Hogarth's Taste in High Life, a forerunner to Marriage à-la-mode commissioned by Mary Edwards around 1742.

c. While Davenport's engraving of Gin Lane is a faithful reproduction of Hogarth's original there are multiple minor variations in his engraving of Beer Street: noticeably, elements from different states are mixed, and lettering is altered or removed on the copy of the King's speech and the scrap books.

d. Baker had bought a number of Hogarth's works at Gulston's sale in 1786 where the first state prints of Gin Lane and Beer Street sold for £1.7s. Whether they were bought by Baker directly is not recorded.

e. Compare this with the four plates of Four Times of the Day, which sold for £6.12s.6d., and a unique proof of Taste in High Life, which went for £4.4s. A proof (probably unique) of the print of Hogarth's self-portrait (with his pug) Gulielmus Hogarth 1749 sold for £25.

== Sources ==
- Bindman, David (1981). Hogarth. Thames and Hudson. ISBN 0-500-20182-X.
- Clerk, Thomas (1812). The Works of William Hogarth. Vol. 2. London: Scholey.
- Dillon, Patrick (2004). Gin: The Much Lamented Death of Madam Geneva the Eighteenth Century Gin Craze. Justin, Charles & Co. ISBN 1-932112-25-1.
- Felton, Samuel (1785). An Explanation of Several of Mr. Hogarth's Prints. London: J.Walter.
- Gay, John (1986). Bryan Loughrey and T. O. Treadwell (ed.). The Beggar's Opera. Penguin Classics. ISBN 0-14-043220-5.
- George, M. Dorothy (1985). London Life in the Eighteenth Century. Academy Chicago Publications. ISBN 0-89733-147-8.
- Hallett, Mark; Riding, Christine (2006). Hogarth. Tate Publishing. ISBN 1-85437-662-4.
- Hazlitt, William (1999). Selected Writings. Oxford University Press, USA. ISBN 0-19-283800-8.
- Hogarth, William (1833). "Remarks on various prints". Anecdotes of William Hogarth, Written by Himself: With Essays on His Life and Genius, and Criticisms on his Work. J.B. Nichols and Son.
- Knight, Charles (1843). London. London: Charles Knight and Co.
- Lamb, Charles (1811). "On the genius and character of Hogarth: with some remarks on a passage in the writings of the late Mr. Barry". The Reflector. 2 (3): 61–77. Archived from the original on 2 March 2008.
- Paulson, Ronald (1992). Hogarth: High Art and Low, 1732–50 Vol 2. Lutterworth Press. ISBN 0-7188-2855-0.
- Paulson, Ronald (1993). Hogarth: Art and Politics, 1750–64 Vol 3. Lutterworth Press. ISBN 0-7188-2875-5.
- Paulson, Ronald (2000). The Life of Henry Fielding. Blackwell Publishing. ISBN 0-631-19146-1.
- Riding, Alan (31 May 2006). "Pfft: Satirical Pinpricks Deflating Pomposity and Power". The New York Times. Archived from the original on 19 April 2011.
- Sewell, Brian (9 February 2007). "Hogarth the Ham-fisted". Evening Standard. London. Archived from the original on 6 February 2008.
- Trusler, John (1833). The Works of William Hogarth. London: Jones and Co.
- Uglow, Jenny (1997). Hogarth: A life and a world. New York: Farrar Straus Giroux. ISBN 0-374-52851-9.
- Walpole, Horace (1849). Anecdotes of painting in England, with some account of the principal artists. London: Henry G. Bohn.
- Warner, Jessica (2002). Craze: Gin and Debauchery in an Age of Reason. Thunder's Mouth Press. ISBN 1-56858-231-5.
