= Beerhouse Act 1830 =

Act of the Parliament of the United Kingdom

Beerhouse Act 1830 (Note: The citation of this act by this short title was authorised by section 1 of, and the first schedule to, the Short Titles Act 1896. Due to the repeal of those provisions it is now authorised by section 19(2) of the Interpretation Act 1978.)
- Act of Parliament
- Parliament of the United Kingdom
- Long title: An Act to permit the general Sale of Beer and Cyder by Retail in England.
- Citation: 11 Geo. 4 & 1 Will. 4. c. 64
- Territorial extent: England and Wales (Note: Section 1.)

Dates
- Royal assent: 23 July 1830
- Commencement: 10 October 1830 (Note: Section 1.)
- Repealed: 5 November 1993
Other legislation
Amended by	Beerhouse Act 1834; Beerhouse Act 1840; Statute Law Revision Act 1873; Statute Law Revision Act 1874; Statute Law Revision Act 1890; Justices of the Peace Act 1949; Customs and Excise Act 1952
Repealed by	Statute Law (Repeals) Act 1993
Relates to	Excise Management Act 1827; Alehouse Act 1828

Status: Repealed

Text of statute as originally enacted

Revised text of statute as amended

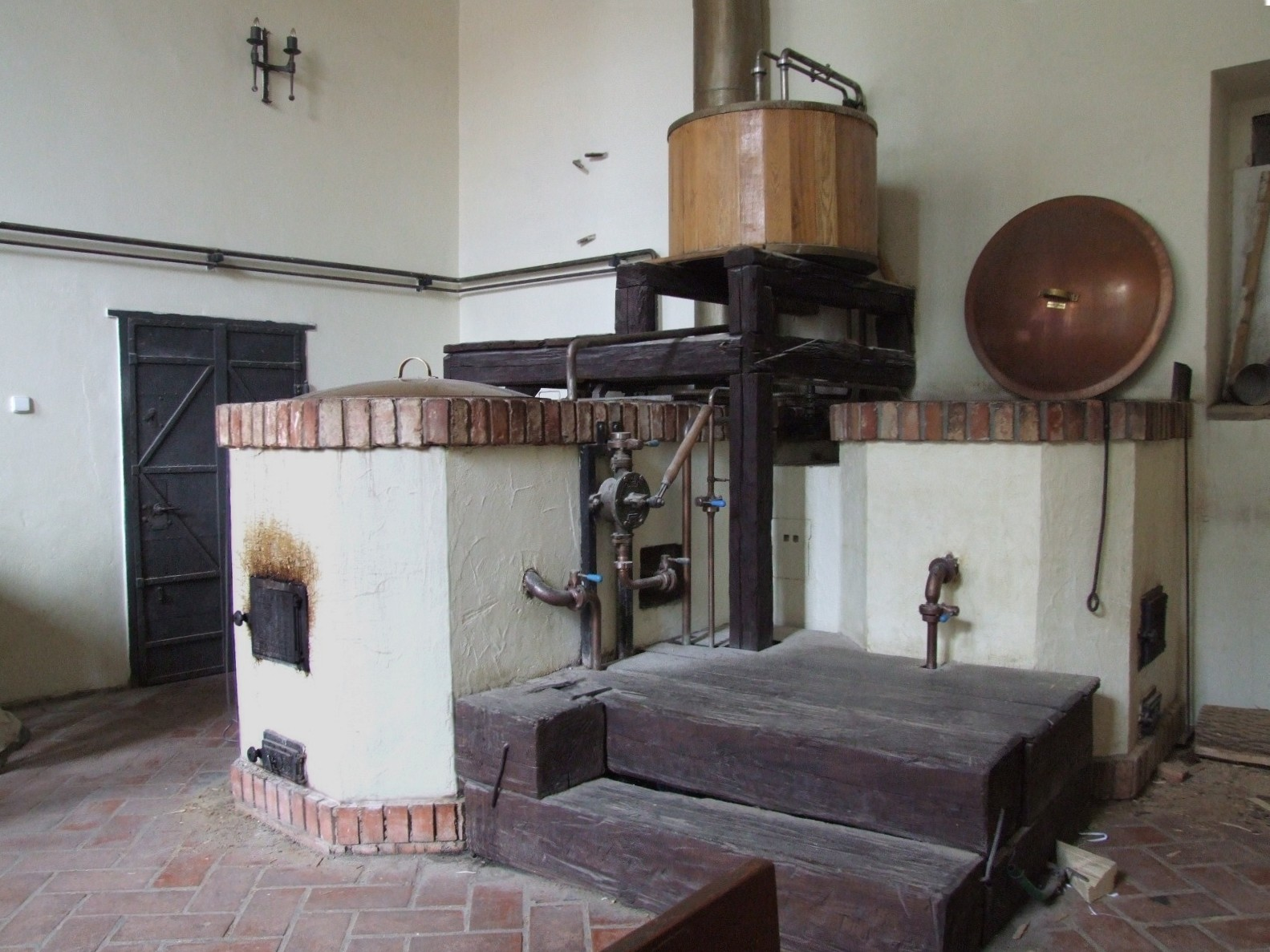
19th century brewery

The Beerhouse Act 1830 (11 Geo. 4 & 1 Will. 4. c. 64) was an act of the Parliament of the United Kingdom, which liberalised the regulations governing the brewing and sale of beer. It was modified by subsequent legislation and finally repealed in 1993. It was one of the Licensing Acts 1828 to 1886.

== Background ==
In an effort to reduce smuggling, Parliament reversed the Gin Act 1751 (24 Geo. 2. c. 40) in 1825, and agreed to reduce the duty on spirits in England by nearly 40%. Consumption of spirits, particularly gin, rose sharply and gin shops began to develop into gin houses and gin palaces. In response, alehouses and inns also began to evolve into purpose-built commercial enterprises. In an effort to tighten regulation of drinking establishments, Parliament enacted the Alehouse Act 1828 (9 Geo. 4. c. 61), which established general annual licensing meetings, to be held in every city, town, division, county, and riding, for the purposes of granting licences to sell exciseable liquors to be drunk on the premises.

However, continued concern about the evolution of drinking establishments, and alarm at the prospect of a return to the Gin Craze, led to Parliament enacting the Beerhouse Act 1830. Unlike the earlier Alehouse Act 1828, it attempted to use deregulation to encourage a return to a more supervised system of alcohol consumption, and promote the consumption of a beer, which was considered to be a more wholesome beverage than spirits.

== Provisions ==
The act created a new tier of drinking establishment, the beerhouse, by enabling any ratepayer to brew and sell beer, ale and porter in their own domestic dwelling upon payment of an annual licence costing two guineas (around £300 in today's money). Drinking establishments had been regulated by local magistrates since 1552, but the new beerhouses were placed outside of their jurisdiction. Licensees were prohibited from selling wine or spirits, but were exempted from beer duty; meaning that large profits were possible.

The intention of the act was to promote the return of a more supervised system of alcohol consumption and encourage people to drink beer, instead of strong spirits, by increasing competition and lowering prices. It resulted in the opening of tens of thousands of new public houses and breweries throughout the country, particularly in the rapidly expanding industrial centres of the north of England, and the price of beer halved by 1838. (Note: In Manchester and Salford alone there were 27 breweries in 1827, which had increased to 75 by 1873.) According to the act, Parliament considered it was

"expedient, for better supplying the Public with Beer in England [and] to give greater facilities for the Sale thereof than are at present afforded by Licenses to Keepers of Inns, Alehouses and Victualling Houses."

== Subsequent developments ==
The act's supporters hoped that, by increasing competition in the brewing and sale of beer, and thus the lowering its price, the population might be weaned off more alcoholic drinks such as gin. But it proved to be controversial, as it removed the lucrative monopoly many local magistrates had to regulate local trade in alcohol, and as it did not apply retrospectively to those who already ran public houses. It was also denounced as promoting drunkenness.

By 1841, licences under the new law had been issued to 45,500 commercial brewers. One factor in the act was the dismantling of provisions for detailed recording of licences, which were restored by subsequent regulatory legislation: the Wine and Beerhouse Act 1869 (32 & 33 Vict. c. 27) and the Wine and Beerhouse Act Amendment Act 1870 (33 & 34 Vict. c. 29). The act was often amended, notably by the Beerhouse Act 1834 (4 & 5 Will. 4. c. 85) and 1840.

The passage of the act during the reign of King William IV led to many taverns and public houses being named in his honour, and he remains "the most popular monarch among pub names".

The whole act was repealed by section 1(1) of, and group I of part XIII of schedule 1 to, the Statute Law (Repeals) Act 1993, which came into force on 5 November 1993.

== See also ==
- Beerhouse Act 1840

== Bibliography ==
- Crispe Whiteley, George (1874). The Licensing Acts 1872–74. Knight & Company.
- Putnam, Roger (2004), The Beer and Breweries of Britain, Shire Books, ISBN 0-7478-0606-3
- Mason, Nicholas. (2001) “‘The Sovereign People are in A Beastly State’: The Beer Act Of 1830 and Victorian Discourse on Working-Class Drunkenness.” Victorian Literature and Culture 29, no. 1 (2001): 109–27.
- Richardson, Neil (1982), "Introduction", Manchester Breweries of Times Gone By, N. Richardson, ISBN 978-0-9506257-4-4
- Troup, C. E. (1897). Judicial Statistics, England and Wales. Great Britain Home Office.*Winskill, Peter Turner (1881), The Comprehensive History of the Rise and Progress of the Temperance Reformation from the Earliest Period to September 1881, Mackie, Brewtnall
