= Licensing Act 1872 =

Act of the Parliament of the United Kingdom

Licensing Act 1872 (Note: Section 1.)
- Act of Parliament
- Parliament of the United Kingdom
- Long title: An Act for Regulating the Sale of Intoxicating Liquors.
- Citation: 35 & 36 Vict. c. 94
- Introduced by: Henry Bruce MP (Commons); John Wodehouse, 1st Earl of Kimberley (Lords)
- Territorial extent: England and Wales; Ireland; (Note: Section 2.)

Dates
- Royal assent: 10 August 1872
- Commencement: 10 August 1872 (Note: The Acts of Parliament (Commencement) Act 1793.)
- Repealed: Northern Ireland: 22 June 1980
Other legislation
Amends	See § Repealed enactments
Repeals/revokes	See § Repealed enactments
Amended by	Statute Law Revision Act 1883; Licensing (Evidence) Act 1884; Summary Jurisdiction Act 1884; Licensing (Consolidation) Act 1910; Customs and Excise Act 1952; Statute Law Revision Act 1953; Statute Law (Repeals) Act 1976; Statue Law (Repeals) Act 1978; Criminal Justice Act 2003; Serious Organised Crime and Police Act 2005
Repealed by	Northern Ireland: Criminal Justice (Northern Ireland) Order 1980
Relates to	Licensing Acts 1828 to 1886

Status: Partially repealed

History of passage through Parliament

Records of Parliamentary debate relating to the statute from Hansard

Text of statute as originally enacted

Revised text of statute as amended

Text of the Licensing Act 1872 as in force today (including any amendments) within the United Kingdom, from legislation.gov.uk.

The Licensing Act 1872 (35 & 36 Vict. c. 94) is an act of the Parliament of the United Kingdom that enacted various regulations and offences relating to alcohol, particularly licensing of premises.

The act is one of the Licensing Acts 1828 to 1886 and was one of the Licensing (Ireland) Acts 1833 to 1886. Most parts of the act have been superseded or repealed by more recent Licensing Acts, but some parts remain in force. In particular, the act creates an offence of being drunk in public with a maximum fine of level 1 on the standard scale (£200 as of 2020); and of being drunk in a public place while in charge of a horse, a cow (or other cattle), a steam engine, or a carriage, or in possession of a loaded firearm, with a possible penalty of a fine of up to level 1 on the standard scale or 51 weeks in prison. "Carriage" has been interpreted as including mobility scooters, though exemptions apply under the Chronically Sick and Disabled Persons Act 1970; bicycles are covered by their own offence in the Road Traffic Act 1988.

The act:

- restricted the closing times in public houses to midnight in towns and 11 o'clock in country areas.
- regulated the content of beer – one of the most common practices was to add salt to the beer, which increased thirst and therefore sales as well.
- said that licensing hours were to be determined by local authorities.
- gave boroughs the option of becoming completely 'dry' i.e. banning all alcohol.

These policies were enforced by the police.

It was an unpopular act for the working classes and there were a number of near riots when police tried to enforce closing hours. Brewers resented what they saw as an attack on their independence and profits; others disliked the act because it interfered with personal liberty.

== Passage ==
The Intoxicating Liquor (Licensing) Bill had its first reading in the House of Lords on 16 April 1872, presented by John Wodehouse, 1st Earl of Kimberley. The bill had its second reading in the House of Lords on 2 May 1872, introduced by John Wodehouse, 1st Earl of Kimberley. During debate, Charles Gordon-Lennox, 7th Duke of Richmond, led criticism of the bill, focusing on the drafting of the bill, the powers given to the Home Secretary over local magistrates and the unfair treatment owners of public houses unfairly by punishing them for tenant misconduct.

The bill was committed to a Committee of the Whole House, which met on 10 May 1872, with amendments. During debate, a proposed amendment to establish special public house inspectors was rejected, but amendments to remove the Home Secretary's veto power over new licenses and reduce the severity of enforcement were accepted.

The bill was re-committed to a committee of the whole house on 7 June 1872, which met on 7 June 1872, where a proposal by Earl Grey's for local authorities to take control of liquor trade based on Gothenburg system was rejected.

The committee met again on 10 June 1872 and reported on 10 June 1872, with amendments. The amended bill had its third reading in the House of Lords on 13 June 1872 and passed, without amendments.

The bill had its first reading in the House of Commons on 17 June 1872. The bill had its second reading in the House of Commons on 11 July 1872 and was committed to a committee of the whole house, which met on 23 July 1872, 26 July 1872, 27 July 1872, 2 August 1872 (twice) and 5 August 1872, and reported on 5 August 1872, with amendments. The third reading of the bill was adjourned on 6 August 1872 due to insufficient time to review changes resulting from the increase size of the bill from 62 to 87 clauses. The amended bill had its third reading in the House of Commons on 7 August 1872 and passed, with amendments. During debate, the Home Secretary, Henry Bruce MP defended the bill as moderate reform rather than prohibition.

The amended bill was considered by the House of Lords on 8 August 1872 and agreed to, with the exception of an amendment to the repeals of one of the acts listed in the second schedule to the act. The Earl of Kimberley noted that the amendments were numerous but mostly made bill less stringent, and peers expressed their optimism that the bill would reduce drunkenness. The House of Commons reported on 8 August 1872 that they did not insist on that amendment.

The bill was granted royal assent on 10 August 1872.

== Provisions ==
=== Repealed enactments ===
Section 26 of the act repealed 24 enactments, listed in the second schedule to the act. Section 26 of the act also included safeguards to preserve any security given, anything duly done, any rights acquired or liabilities accrued, any removal of a license or certificate in pursuance of the section 2 of the Intoxicating Liquors (Licences Suspension) Act 1871 (34 & 35 Vict. c. 88), any penalty forfeiture or punishment incurred, to be incurred or under investigation. Section 26 of the act also provided that notices under the Gaming Act 1845 (8 & 9 Vict. c. 109) were to be those deemed by this act, and that offences under that act be offences under the act.

Citation	Short title	Title	Extent of repeal
21 James 1. c. 7	Drunkenness Act 1623	An Act for the better repressing of drunkenness, and restraining the inordinate haunting of inns, alehouses, and other victualling houses.	So much as is unrepealed.
9 Geo. 4. c. 61	Alehouse Act 1828	An Act to regulate the granting of licenses to keepers of inns, alehouses, and victualling houses in England.	Section six; section ten; section eleven; so much of section thirteen as relates to the form of license; sections eighteen and nineteen; section twenty; section twenty-one; section twenty-two; section twenty-three; section twenty-six; also section twenty-seven; section twenty-eight; section twenty-nine, except in so far as the three last-mentioned sections relate to the renewal of licenses or to the transfer of licenses under sections four and fourteen of the same Act; also section thirty-one; section thirty-three; section thirty-four.
11 Geo. 4 & 1 W. 4. c. 64	Beerhouse Act 1830	An Act to permit the general sale of beer and cyder by retail in England.	Section six; section eleven; section twelve; section thirteen; section fifteen; section sixteen; section seventeen; section eighteen; section nineteen; section twenty; section twenty-one; section twenty-two; section twenty-six; section twenty-seven; so much of section thirty as incorporates or applies any repealed enactment.
4 & 5 Will. 4. c. 85	Beerhouse Act 1834	An Act to amend an Act passed in the first year of His present Majesty to permit the general sale of beer and cider by retail in England.	Section four; section seven; section ten; so much of section eleven as incorporates or applies any repealed enactment; section eighteen; section twenty-two.
2 & 3 Vict. c. 47	Metropolitan Police Act 1839	An Act for further improving the police in and near the metropolis.	Section forty, from "and in the case of any offence" to end of section.
3 & 4 Vict. c. 61	Beerhouse Act 1840	An Act to amend the Acts relating to the general sale of beer and cider by retail in England.	Section ten; section thirteen; section fifteen; section sixteen; section seventeen; section twenty-one as incorporates or applies any repealed enactment; also so much of section forty-two.
11 & 12 Vict. c. 49	Sale of Beer, etc. on Sunday Act 1848	An Act for regulating the sale of beer and other liquors on the Lord's Day.	The whole act so far as it relates to England.
18 & 19 Vict. c. 118	Intoxicating Liquors Act 1855	An Act to repeal the Act of the seventeenth and eighteenth years of the reign of Her present Majesty for further regulating the sale of beer and other liquors on the Lord's Day, and to substitute other provisions in lieu thereof.	The whole act.
23 & 24 Vict. c. 27	Refreshment Houses Act 1860	An Act for granting to Her Majesty certain duties on wine licenses and refreshment houses, and for regulating the licensing of refreshment houses and the granting of wine licenses.	Section five; section seventeen; section twenty; section twenty-six; section twenty-seven; section twenty-eight; section twenty-nine; section thirty-one; also sections eighteen, thirty-one, thirty-two, thirty-three, thirty-four, thirty-five, thirty-six, thirty-seven, thirty-eight, forty-one, and forty-two, so far as such sections relate to the sale of intoxicating liquors or any offences connected therewith; also section thirty-nine; section forty.
23 & 24 Vict. c. 113	Excise Act 1860	An Act to grant duties of excise on chicory and on licenses to dealers in sweets or made wines, also to reduce the excise duty on hops and the period of credit allowed for payment of the duty on malt and hops respectively; to repeal the exemption from license duty of persons dealing in foreign wine and spirits in bond, and to amend the laws relating to the excise.	Section forty-one.
27 & 28 Vict. c. 64	Public House Closing Act 1864	An Act for further regulating the closing of public houses and refreshment houses within the metropolitan police district, the city of London, certain corporate boroughs, and other places.	The whole act, except in so far as it relates to refreshment houses in which intoxicating liquors are not sold.
28 & 29 Vict. c. 77	Public House Closing Act 1865	An Act to amend the 27 & 28 Vict. c. 64, commonly called "The Public House Closing Act, 1864."	The whole act, except in so far as it relates to refreshment houses in which intoxicating liquors are not sold.
32 & 33 Vict. c. 27	Wine and Beerhouse Act 1869	An Act to amend the law relating to the licensing beerhouses, and to make certain alterations with respect to the sale by retail of beer, cider, and wine.	So much of section six as relates to the form of certificate; section twelve; section thirteen; section fourteen; section fifteen; section sixteen; section seventeen; section eighteen; section nineteen as relates to offences; section twenty-two.
33 & 34 Vict. c. 29	Wine and Beerhouse Act Amendment Act 1870	An Act to amend "The Wine and Beerhouse Act Amendment Act, 1869."	Section six; section seven, from "the second and third provisoes" to the end of section; section eight; section nine; section twelve; section thirteen; section fifteen; section seventeen.
34 & 35 Vict. c. 88	Intoxicating Liquors (Licences Suspension) Act 1871	An Act to restrict during a limited time the grant by justices of the peace of new licenses and certificates for the sale of intoxicating liquors by retail, and for other purposes.	The whole act.

== Subsequent developments ==
Courtenay Ilbert described the act as a Consolidation Act, given that the act, which amended the law relating to alcohol, also consolidated various enactments relating to that particular branch of law.

In 1884, offences under the act were considered in the case Cundy v Le Cocq. The defendant was convicted of unlawfully selling alcohol to an intoxicated person under the Licensing Act. On appeal, the defendant contended that he had been unaware of the customer's drunkenness and thus should be acquitted. The court held that knowledge was irrelevant — the question was whether a reasonable dispenser of the last drink sold would have realised the customer was clearly intoxicated.

In section 12 of the act, the words " with or without hard labour " and from " where the court " to the end of the section were repealed by section 1 of, and the first schedule to, the Statute Law Revision Act 1953 (2 & 3 Eliz. 2. c. 5), which came into force on 18 December 1953.

In section 39, the words "or confirm", and in section 75, the words from "and in construing" onwards was repealed by section 1(1) of, and part XXI of schedule 1 to, the Statute Law (Repeals) Act 1976, which came into force on 27 May 1976.

Section 39 of the act was repealed by section 1(1) of, and part XVII of schedule 1 to, the Statute Law (Repeals) Act 1978, which came into force on 31 July 1978.

== See also ==
- Cundy v Le Cocq
