= Licensing Act =

Stock short title used in UK legislation

Licensing Act (with its variations) is a stock short title used in the United Kingdom for legislation relating to licensing.

== List ==
- Licensing Order of 1643, an ordinance imposing pre-publication censorship and prompting Milton to write Areopagitica.
- Licensing of the Press Act 1662 (14 Cha. 2. c. 33), an act regulating the printing industry
- Licensing Act 1737 (10 Geo. 2. c. 28), an act for the licensing of theatrical premises
- Licensing Act 2003 (c. 17), an act for the licensing premises which are used for the sale or supply of alcohol, provide regulated entertainment or provide late night refreshment

Licensing of premises to sell alcohol:

- The Universities (Wine Licences) Act 1743 (16 Geo. 2. c. 40)
- The Licensing Act 1902 (2 Edw. 7. c. 28)
- The Licensing Act 1921 (11 & 12 Geo. 5. c. 42)
- The Home Counties (Music and Dancing) Licensing Act 1926 (16 & 17 Geo. 5. c. 31)
- The Licensing Act 1949 (12, 13 & 14 Geo. 6. c. 59)
- The Licensing Act 1953 (1 & 2 Eliz. 2. c 46)
- The Licensing (Seamen's Canteens) Act 1954 (2 & 3 Eliz. 2. c. 11)
- The Licensing (Airports) Act 1956 (4 & 5 Eliz. 2. c. 37)
- The Occasional Licences and Young Persons Act 1956 (4 & 5 Eliz. 2. c. 42)
- The Licensing (Scotland) Act 1959 (7 & 8 Eliz. 2. c. 51)
- The Licensing Act 1961 (9 & 10 Eliz. 2. c. 61)
- The Licensing (Scotland) Act 1962 (10 & 11 Eliz. 2. c. 51)
- The Licensing Act 1964 (c. 26)
- The Licensing (Certificates in Suspense) (Scotland) Act 1967 (c. 14)
- The Licensing (Amendment) Act 1967 (c. 51)
- The Licensing Act (Northern Ireland) 1971 (c. 13)
- The Licensing (Abolition of State Management) Act 1971 (c. 65)
- The Licensing (Amendment) Act 1976 (c. 18)
- The Licensing (Scotland) Act 1976 (c. 66)
- The Licensing (Amendment) Act 1977 (c. 26)
- The Licensing (Northern Ireland) Order 1978 (SI 1978/1044 (N.I. 14))
- The Licensed Premises (Exclusion of Certain Persons) Act 1980 (c. 32)
- The Licensing (Amendment) Act 1980 (c. 40)
- The Licensing (Alcohol Education and Research) Act 1981 (c. 28)
- The Licensing (Amendment) Act 1981 (c. 37)
- The Licensing (International Airports) (Northern Ireland) Order 1983 (SI 1983/420 (N.I. 6))
- The Licensing (Occasional Permissions) Act 1983 (c. 24)
- The Licensing (Amendment) Act 1985 (c. 40)
- The Licensing (Northern Ireland) Order 1987 (SI 1987/1277 (N.I. 13))
- The Licensing (Restaurant Meals) Act 1987 (c. 2)
- The Licensing Act 1988 (c. 17)
- The Licensing (Retail Sales) Act 1988 (c. 25)
- The Licensing (Amendment) Act 1989 (c. 20)
- The Licensing (Northern Ireland) Order 1990 (1990/594 (N.I. 6))
- The Licensing (Low Alcohol Drinks) Act 1990 (c. 21)
- The Licensing (Amendment) (Scotland) Act 1992 (c. 18)
- The Licensing (Validation) (Northern Ireland) Order 1992 (SI 1992/1726 (N.I. 16))
- The Licensing (Amendment) (Scotland) Act 1993 (c. 20)
- The Licensing (Sunday Hours) Act 1995 (c. 33)
- The Licensing (Amendment) (Scotland) Act 1996 (c. 36)
- The Licensing (Northern Ireland) Order 1996 (SI 1996/3158 (N.I. 22))
- The Licensing (Young Persons) Act 2000 (c. 30)
- The Licensing Act 2003 (c. 17)
- The Licensing (Scotland) Act 2005 (asp 16)
- The Criminal Justice and Licensing (Scotland) Act 2010 (asp 13)
- The Licensing and Registration of Clubs (Amendment) Act (Northern Ireland) 2011 (c. 18 (NI))
- The Licensing Act (Northern Ireland) 2016 (c. 24 (NI))
- The Air Weapons and Licensing (Scotland) Act 2015 (asp 10)
- The Licensing and Registration of Clubs (Amendment) Act (Northern Ireland) 2021 (c. 7 (NI))

The Licensing Acts 1828 to 1886 is the collective title of the following Acts:

- The Alehouse Act 1828 (9 Geo. 4. c. 61)
- The Beerhouse Act 1830 (11 Geo. 4 & 1 Will. 4. c. 64)
- The Beerhouse Act 1834 (4 & 5 Will. 4. c. 85)
- The Beerhouse Act 1840 (3 & 4 Vict. c. 61)
- The Licensing Act 1842 (5 & 6 Vict. c. 64)
- The Wine and Beerhouse Act 1869 (32 & 33 Vict. c 27)
- The Wine and Beerhouse Act Amendment 1870 (33 & 34 Vict. c. 29)
- The Beerhouse Act 1870 (33 & 34 Vict. c. 111)
- The Licensing Act 1872 (35 & 36 Vict. c. 94)
- The Licensing Act 1874 (37 & 38 Vict. c. 49)
- The Beer Dealers Retail Licences Act 1880 (43 Vict. c. 6)
- The Sunday Closing (Wales) Act 1881 (44 & 45 Vict. c. 61)
- The Beer Dealers Retail Licences (Amendment) Act 1882 (45 & 46 Vict. c. 34)
- The Licensing (Evidence) Act 1884 (47 & 48 Vict. c. 29)
- The Intoxicating Liquors (Sale to Children) Act 1886 (49 & 50 Vict. c. 56)

The Licensing (Ireland) Acts 1833 to 1886 is the collective title of the following Acts:

- The Licensing (Ireland) Act 1833 (3 & 4 Will. 4. c. 68)
- The Licensing (Ireland) Act 1836 (6 & 7 Will. 4. c. 38)
- The Licensing (Ireland) Act 1855 (18 & 19 Vict. c. 62)
- The Public House (Ireland) Act 1855 (18 & 19 Vict. c. 114)
- The Licensing (Ireland) Act 1860 (23 & 24 Vict. c. 35)
- The Beerhouse (Ireland) Act 1864 (27 & 28 Vict. c. 35)
- The Beerhouse (Ireland) Act (1864) Amendment Act 1871 (34 & 35 Vict. c. 111)
- The Licensing Act 1872 (35 & 36 Vict. c. 94)
- The Licensing (Ireland) Act 1874 (37 & 38 Vict. c. 69)
- The Beer Licences Regulation (Ireland) Act 1877 (40 & 41 Vict. c. 4)
- The Beer Dealers Retail Licences (Amendment) Act 1882 (45 & 46 Vict. c. 34)
- The Intoxicating Liquors (Sale to Children) Act 1886 (49 & 50 Vict. c. 56)

The Licensing (Scotland) Acts 1828 to 1887 is the collective title of the following Acts:

- The Licensing (Scotland) Act 1828 (9 Geo. 4. c. 58)
- The Licensing (Scotland) Act 1853 (16 & 17 Vict. c. 67)
- The Public Houses Acts Amendment (Scotland) Act 1862 (25 & 26 Vict. c. 35)
- The Publicans' Certificates (Scotland) Act 1876 (39 & 40 Vict. c. 26)
- The Publicans' Certificates (Scotland) Act (1876) Amendment Act 1877 (40 & 41 Vict. c. 3)
- The Public Houses, Hours of Closing (Scotland) Act 1887 (50 & 51 Vict. c. 38)

== See also ==
- List of short titles
