= Lord Anne Hamilton =

British Army officer

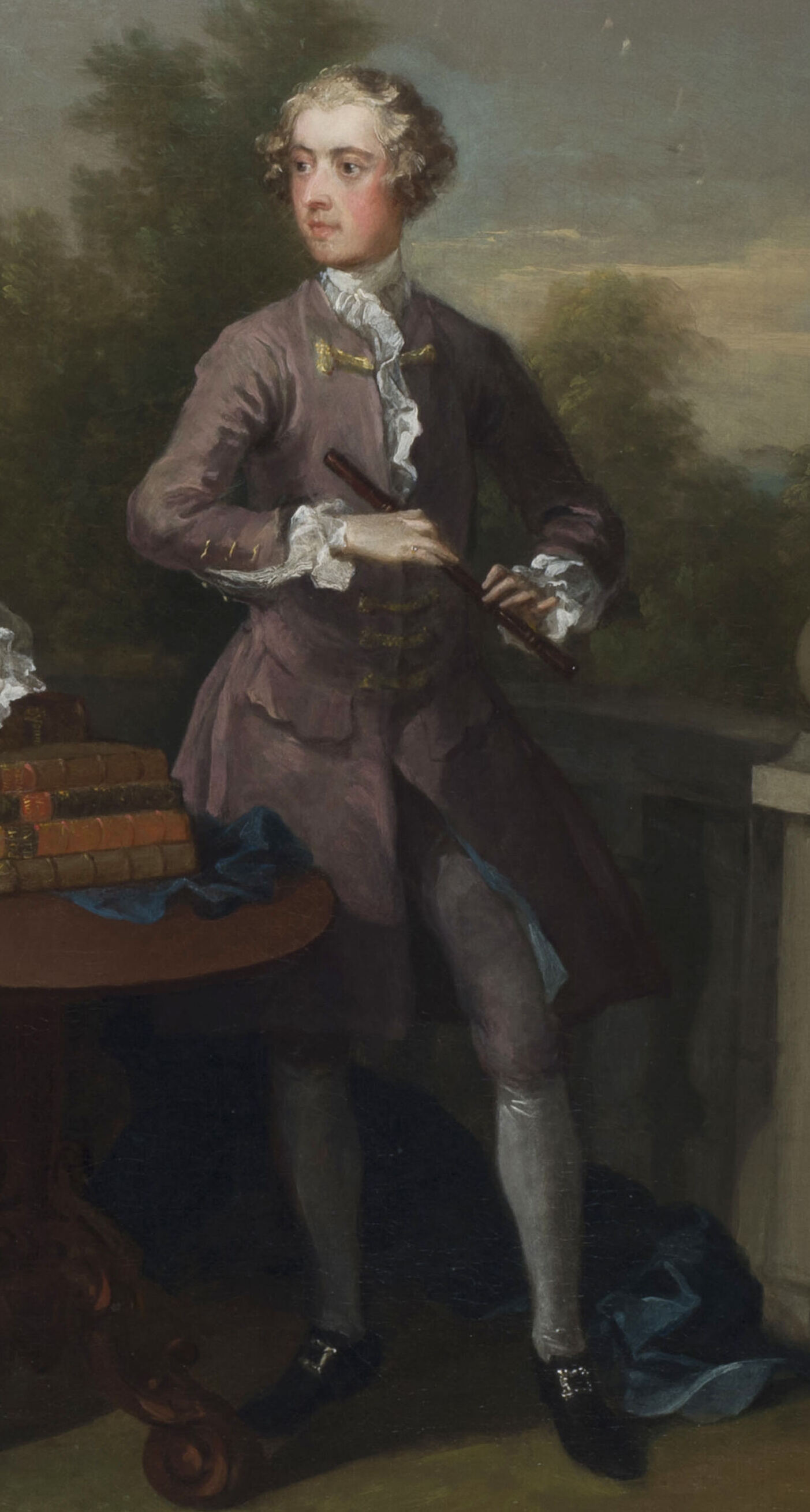
- Hamilton in a 1734 family portrait by William Hogarth
- Born: 12 October 1709; London, England
- Died: 25 December 1748 (aged 39); France
- Resting place: St James's Church, Piccadilly
- Occupation: Aristocrat
- Known for: marrying Britain's richest woman
- Spouse: Anna Charlotta Maria Powell (m. 1742)
- Children: James Hamilton; Charles Powell Hamilton; Gerard Anne Edwardes
- Parent(s): James Hamilton, 4th Duke of Hamilton; Elizabeth Gerard

Lord Anne Hamilton (12 October 1709 – 25 December 1748) was a British Army officer. He reportedly married Mary Edwards, the richest woman in England, and they had a child.

== Early life ==
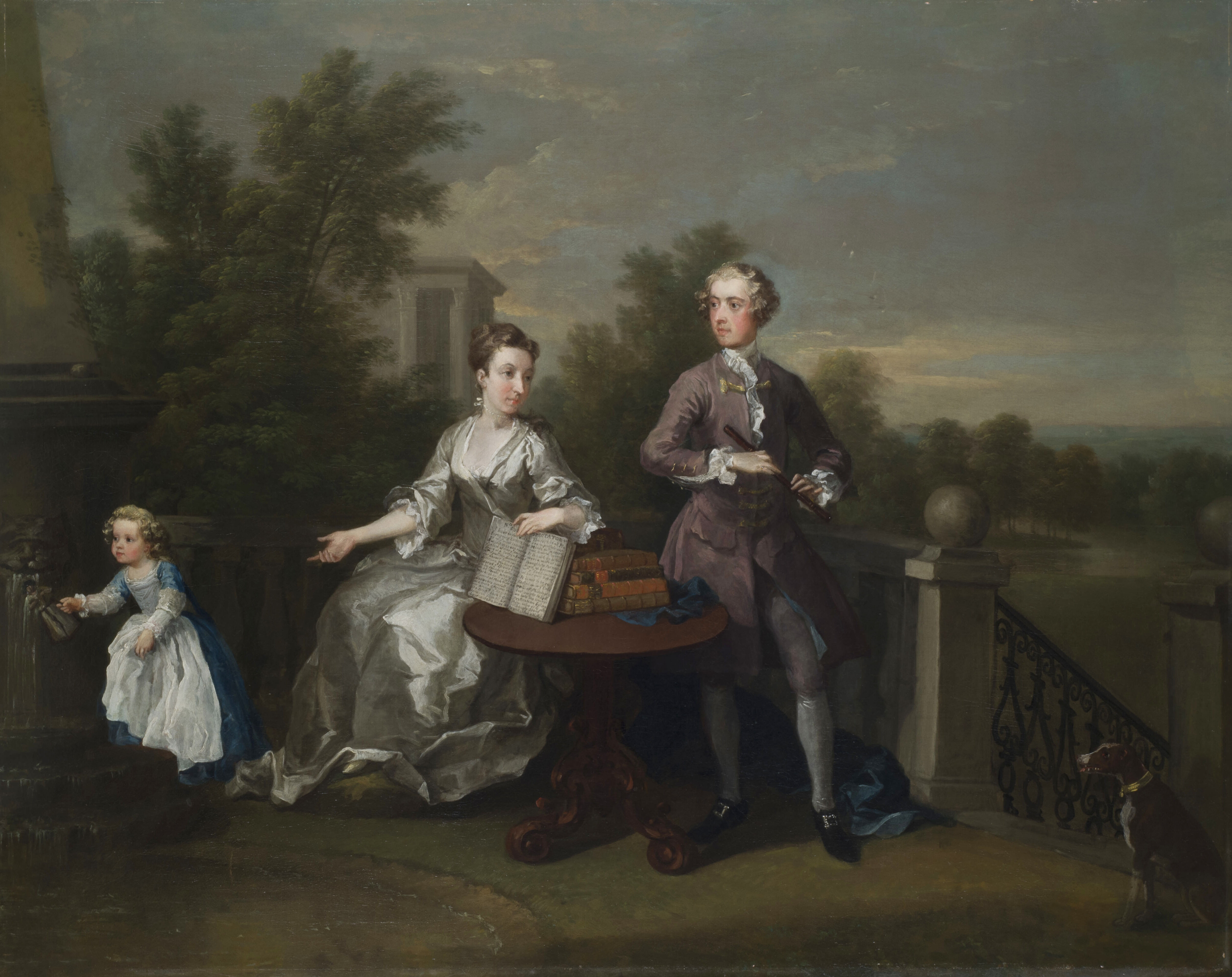
Edwards Hamilton Family on a Terrace (William Hogarth, 1734)

Hamilton was born at St. James's Square, London, the third son of Lieutenant-General James Hamilton, 4th Duke of Hamilton, and his wife the Honourable Elizabeth Gerard, daughter of Digby Gerard, 5th Baron Gerard. His feminine forename is due to his being named after his godmother, Queen Anne. Hamilton's other godparents were John Churchill, 1st Duke of Marlborough and Charles Spencer, 3rd Earl of Sunderland. Hamilton was commissioned into the British Army's 2nd Regiment of Foot Guards as an ensign on 4 April 1731, and resigned in May 1733.

== Later life and death ==
Lord Anne Hamilton reputedly married Mary Edwards, in or before 1731, in a clandestine marriage said to have been in the chapel of the Fleet Prison. It was reported in The Gentleman's Magazine but the chapel records do not include details and Mary Edwards denied it and never changed her name. She was the daughter and heiress of Francis Edwards of Welham Grove, Leicestershire. She was one of the greatest heiresses of her day with an annual income of between £50,000 and £60,000. Lord Anne assumed Mary Edwards' name and arms as Lord Anne Edwards Hamilton. Their portraits were painted by William Hogarth with their son Gerard Anne Edwards. Mary Edwards also commissioned Hogarth to paint Taste in High Life in 1742. The couple had one child, a son:

- Gerard Anne Edwardes (1734–1773), married in 1754, Lady Jane Noel, daughter of Baptist Noel, 4th Earl of Gainsborough of the first creation. They were the parents of Sir Gerard Noel, 2nd Baronet, ancestor of the Earls of Gainsborough of the second creation.

Sometime after 1734, because she felt that Lord Anne was becoming spendthrift with her money, Mary Edwards left him and took the extraordinary step of repudiating her marriage. She declared herself a single woman and took steps to create evidence that no marriage had ever taken place; their child, Gerard Anne Edwards, was rendered illegitimate, and took his mother's surname.

After this unprecedented development, Hamilton married Anna Charlotta Maria Powell, daughter of Charles Powell, in October 1742. They had two sons:

- Lieutenant-Colonel James Hamilton (1746–1804)
- Admiral Charles Powell Hamilton (1747–1825, whose great-grandson succeeded in 1895 as 13th Duke.

Hamilton died in France at the age of 39, and was buried at St James's Church, Piccadilly on 7 July 1749. Upon the death of the 12th Duke of Hamilton in 1895, without male issue, Lord Anne's descendant, Alfred Douglas-Hamilton succeeded to the dukedom of Hamilton.
