= Ale Houses Act 1551 =

Act of the Parliament of England

- Act of Parliament
- Parliament of England
- Long title: An Act for Keepers of Ale-houses to be bound by Recognisances.
- Citation: 5 & 6 Edw. 6. c. 25

Dates
- Royal assent: 15 April 1552
- Commencement: 1 May 1552 (Note: Section 1.)
- Repealed: 10 October 1828
Other legislation
Repealed by	Alehouse Act 1828

Status: Repealed

Text of statute as originally enacted

The Ale Houses Act 1551 (5 & 6 Edw. 6. c. 25), or sometimes the Licensing Act 1551, was an act of the Parliament of England that was passed in 1552 to control the "abuses and disorders as are had and used in common ale-houses", and laid the foundation of modern licensing law in the United Kingdom.

== The act ==
The act provided that the Justices of the Peace were given power within their jurisdiction to stop the common selling of ale and beer in common ale-houses and tippling-houses, where they felt it to be appropriate and convenient. No-one was to be permitted to keep an ale-house without being so licensed by the Justices at Quarter Sessions, and the Justices were to take bond and surety of the keepers of common ale-houses and tippling-houses. This surety was to prevent the playing of unlawful games as well as for the maintenance of public order. Common selling of ale in booths at a fair by any person was permitted, however, "for the relief of the King's subjects that shall repair to the same", notwithstanding the rest of the act.

== Subsequent developments ==
The whole act was repealed by section 35 of the Alehouse Act 1828 (9 Geo. 4. c. 61), which came into force on 10 October 1828.
