= Beerhouse Act 1840 =

Act of the Parliament of the United Kingdom

Beerhouse Act 1840 (Note: The citation of this act by this short title was authorised by section 1 of, and the first schedule to, the Short Titles Act 1896. Due to the repeal of those provisions it is now authorised by section 19(2) of the Interpretation Act 1978.)
- Act of Parliament
- Parliament of the United Kingdom
- Long title: An Act to amend the Acts relating to the general Sale of Beer and Cider by Retail in England.
- Citation: 3 & 4 Vict. c. 61
- Territorial extent: United Kingdom

Dates
- Royal assent: 7 August 1840
- Commencement: 7 August 1840 (Note: The Acts of Parliament (Commencement) Act 1793.)
- Repealed: 1 January 1953
Other legislation
| Amends | Beerhouse Act 1830; Beerhouse Act 1834 |
| Amended by | Licensing Act 1872; Statute Law Revision Act 1874 (No. 2); Statute Law Revision Act 1878; Criminal Justice Act 1948 |
| Repealed by | Customs and Excise Act 1952 |

Status: Repealed

Text of statute as originally enacted

The Beerhouse Act 1840 (3 & 4 Vict. c. 61) was an act of the Parliament of the United Kingdom. It was one of the Licensing Acts 1828 to 1886. It was the third Beerhouse Act. It was passed to amend the Beerhouse Act 1830 (1 Will. 4. c. 64) and the Beerhouse Act 1834 (4 & 5 Will. 4. c. 85). The change in the law required persons to have continued residence within the building that they were intending to use after an application for the issuing of a licence for the selling of alcohol, and that they be in possession of the deeds of ownership of the building.

The act was passed to control the development of civil disorder (national evil) caused by those involved in activities resulting from the vice of intoxication, specifically of the people within the class of labouring workers in ale houses, so that in 1834 a select committee was created to investigate in order that measures of legislature might be created to limit this.

== Subsequent developments ==
The whole act was repealed by section 320(1) of, and part I of the twelfth schedule to, the Customs and Excise Act 1952 (15 & 16 Geo. 6 & 1 Eliz. 2. c. 44), which came into force on 1 January 1953.

== Bibliography ==
- John Mounteney Lely. "The Beerhouse Act, 1840". The Statutes of Practical Utility. (Chitty's Statutes). Fifth Edition. Sweet and Maxwell. Stevens and Sons. Chancery Lane, London. 1894. Volume 5. Title "Intoxicating Liquors". Pages 34 to 38.
