= Cundy v Le Cocq =

Cundy v Le Cocq is an 1884 case in English law concerned with an offence of the Licensing Act 1872, deemed a key one which comes with strict liability.

The defendant was convicted of unlawfully selling alcohol to an intoxicated person under the Licensing Act. On appeal, the defendant contended that he had been unaware of the customer's drunkenness and thus should be acquitted. The court held that knowledge was irrelevant - the question was whether a reasonable dispenser of the last drink sold would have realised the customer was clearly intoxicated.
