= Gin Craze =

Historical event in Great Britain

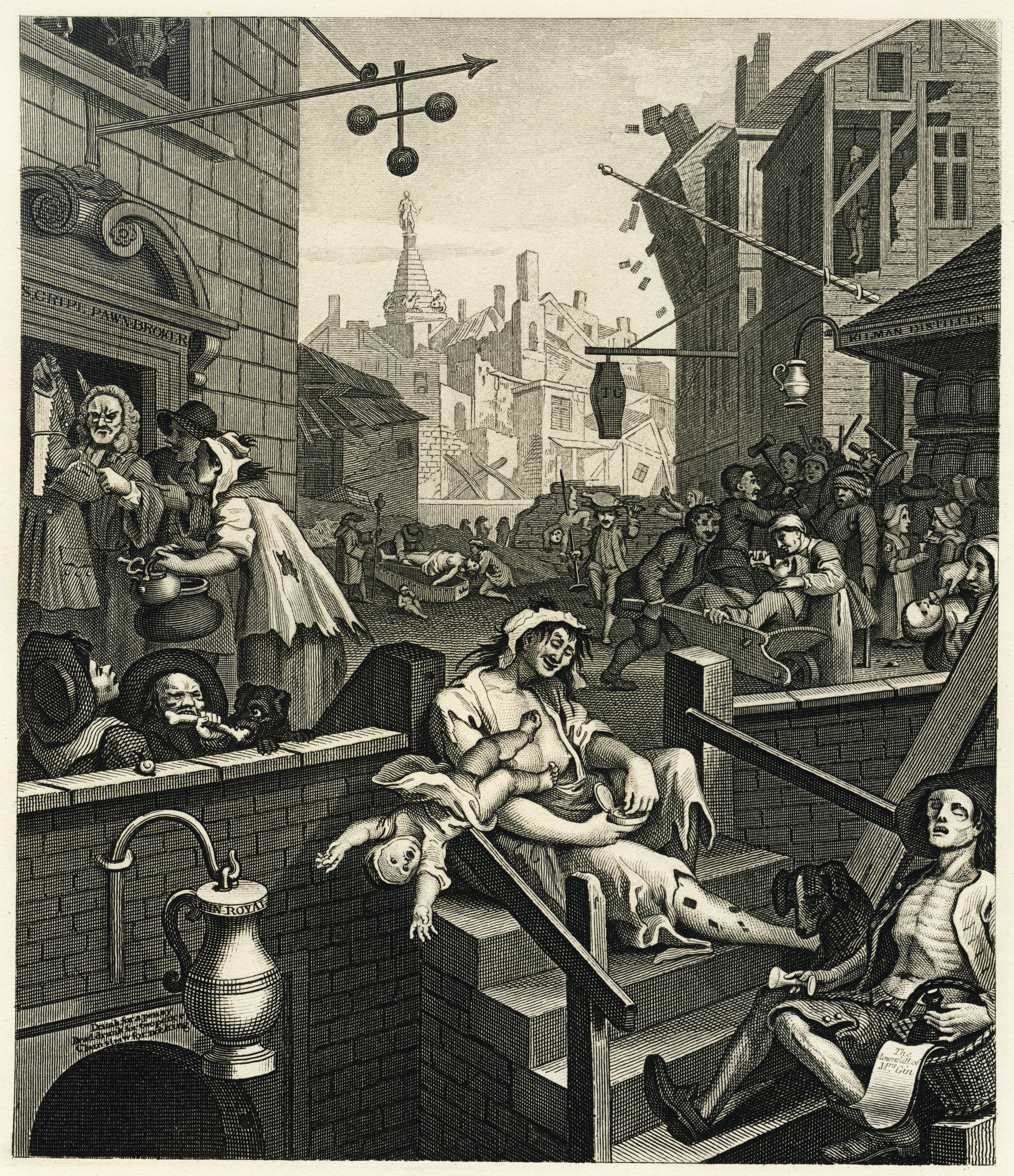
Gin Lane by William Hogarth, 1751; it depicts what was by then considered a "drug crisis".

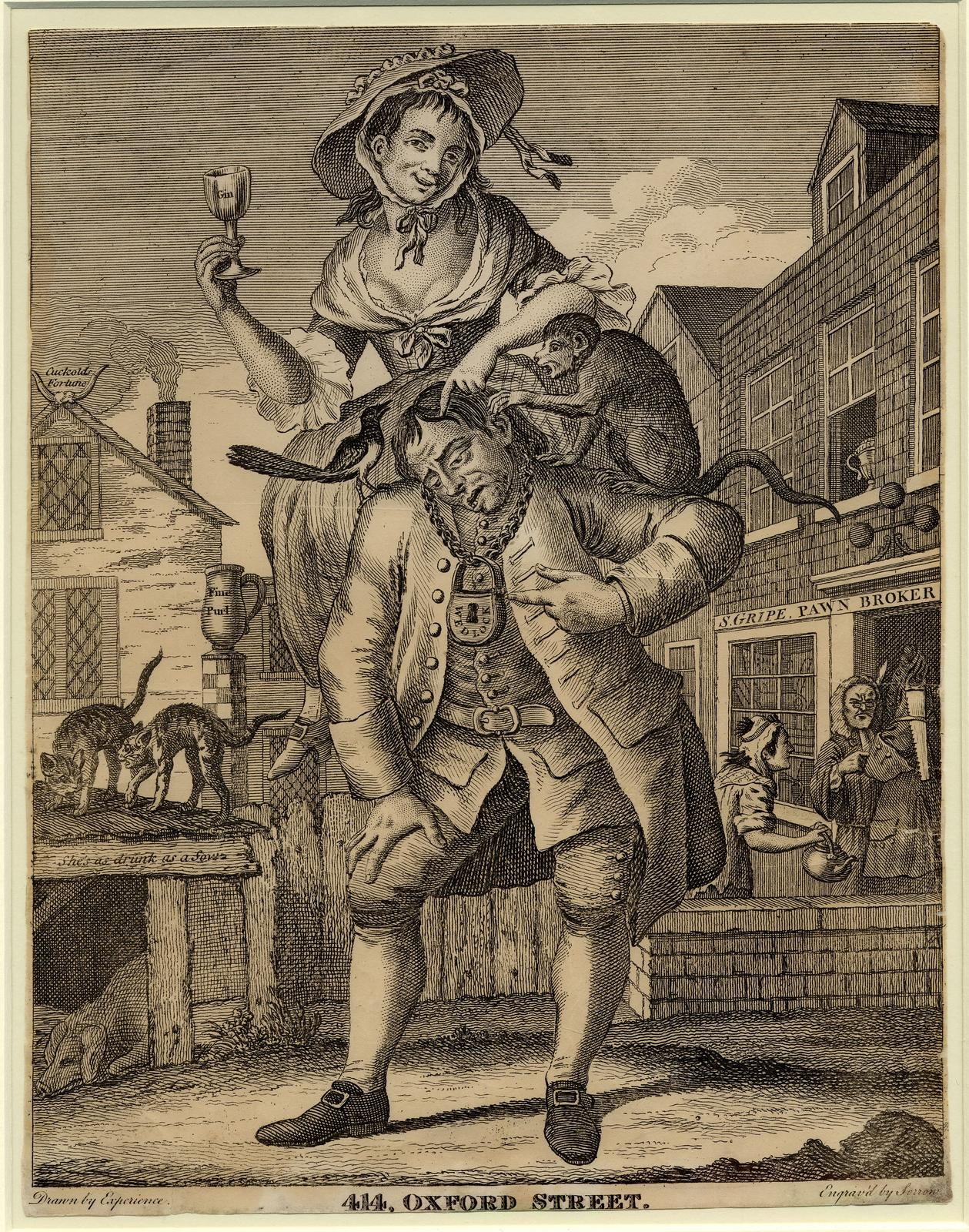
A satirical print on marriage from 1751; the husband wears a padlock on his neck marked 'Wedlock,' and his wife drinks a large glass of gin.

In the first half of the 18th century, the consumption of gin increased rapidly in Great Britain, especially in London. This so-called Gin Craze was the result of legislation that encouraged domestic gin production and restricted brandy imports. As gin production and consumption spread, public drunkenness and alcoholism became major public concerns.

Parliament passed five major acts, in 1729, 1736, 1743, 1747 and 1751, designed to control the consumption of gin. By 1757, increasingly restrictive licensing requirements and the rising price of grain had brought the Gin Craze to an end.

== Causes ==
Gin was popularised in England following the accession of William of Orange in 1688. Gin provided an alternative to French brandy at a time of both political and religious conflict between Britain and France. Between 1689 and 1697, the Government passed a range of legislation aimed at restricting brandy imports and encouraging gin production. Most importantly, the monopoly of the London Guild of Distillers was broken in 1690, thereby opening up the market in gin distillation. The production and consumption of English gin, which was then popular among politicians and even Queen Anne, was encouraged by the government. This encouragement was shown in the reduced taxes on the distillation of spirits. No licenses were needed to make spirits and distillers could have smaller, simpler workshops than brewers, who were required to serve food and provide shelter for patrons.

Economic protectionism was a major factor in beginning the Gin Craze; as the price of food dropped and income grew, consumers suddenly had the opportunity to spend excess funds on spirits. By 1721, Middlesex magistrates were already decrying gin as "the principal cause of all the vice & debauchery committed among the inferior sort of people". In 1736, the Middlesex Magistrates complained,

It is with the deepest concern your committee observe the strong Inclination of the inferior Sort of People to these destructive Liquors, and how surprisingly this Infection has spread within these few Years ... it is scarce possible for Persons in low Life to go anywhere or to be anywhere, without being drawn in to taste, and, by Degrees, to like and approve of this pernicious Liquor.

Daniel Defoe commented: "the Distillers have found out a way to hit the palate of the Poor, by their new fashion'd compound Waters called Geneva, so that the common People seem not to value the French-brandy as usual, and even not to desire it".

Although it is commonly thought gin or jenever was the particular drink that became popular, at that time the word "gin" was also used as a general term for drinks distilled from grain.

== Legislative responses ==
The British government tried a number of times to restrict the flow of gin. The Gin Act 1736 taxed retail sales at a rate of 20 shillings a gallon on spirits and required licensees to take out a £50 annual licence to sell gin, a fee equivalent to about £9,000 today. The aim was to effectively prohibit the trade by making it economically unfeasible. Only two licences were ever taken out. The trade became illegal, consumption dipped but then continued to rise and the law was effectively repealed in 1743 following mass law-breaking and violence (particularly towards informers who were paid £5 to reveal the whereabouts of illegal gin shops). The illegally distilled gin which was produced following the 1736 Act was less reliable and more likely to result in poisoning.

By 1743, the English were drinking 2.2 gallons (10 litres) of gin per person per year, equivalent to about 27 ml (one measure) per person per day. As consumption increased, a campaign for more effective legislation began to emerge, led by the Bishop of Sodor and Man, Thomas Wilson, who, in 1736, had complained that gin produced a "drunken ungovernable set of people". Prominent anti-gin campaigners included Henry Fielding (whose 1751 "Enquiry into the Late Increase in Robbers" blamed gin consumption for increased crime and increased ill health among children), Josiah Tucker, Daniel Defoe (who had originally campaigned for the liberalisation of distilling, but later complained that drunken mothers were threatening to produce a "fine spindle-shanked generation" of children) and – briefly – William Hogarth. Hogarth's engraving Gin Lane is a well known image of the gin craze, and is often paired with Beer Street, creating a contrast between the miserable lives of gin drinkers and the healthy and enjoyable lives of beer drinkers.

== End of the Gin Craze ==
The Gin Craze began to diminish after the Gin Act 1751. This Act lowered the annual licence fees, but encouraged "respectable" gin selling by requiring licensees to trade from premises rented for at least £10 a year. Historians suggest that gin consumption was reduced not as a result of legislation but because of the rising cost of grain. Landowners could afford to abandon the production of gin and this, coupled with population growth and a series of poor harvests, resulted in lower wages and increased food prices.

The Gin Craze had mostly ended by 1757. The government tried to ensure this by temporarily banning the manufacture of spirits from domestic grain. There was a resurgence of gin consumption during the Victorian era, with numerous "gin palaces" appearing. In 1840, the amount of gin consumed in London (but by that time with a population in excess of one million) finally matched that from when prohibition ended in 1743.

== See also ==
- Dipsomania
- Dutch courage – One version of the history states that jenever (or Dutch gin) was used by English soldiers for its calming effects before battle.
- Prohibition in the United Kingdom

== Sources ==
- Daniel Defoe, A Brief Case of the Distillers and of the Distilling Trade in England (London: T. Warner, 1726)
- Patrick Dillon, The Much-Lamented Death of Madam Geneva: The Eighteenth-Century Gin Craze (London: Review, 2002)
- Fielding, Henry, An Enquiry into the Causes of the Late Increase of Robbers and Related Writings, ed. Malvin R. Zirker (Oxford: Clarendon Press, 1988)
- M. Dorothy George, London Life in the Eighteenth Century (1925; Harmondsworth: Penguin, 1992)
- Jessica Warner, Craze: Gin and Debauchery in the Age of Reason (London: Random House, 2002)
- Elise Skinner, "The Gin Craze: Drink, Crime & Women in 18th Century London", Cultural Shifts
- Considerations on the Increase of Crime and the Degree of its Extent, the Principal Causes of such Increase, and the Most Likely Means for Prevention or Mitigation of this Public Calamity. Addressed to the Magistracy of the County of Surrey in the Form of a Report. As originally drawn by Randle Jackson, Esq, A Magistrate of that county. Published: London, 1828.
