= Samuel Davenport (engraver) =

Samuel Davenport (1783–1867) was an English line engraver. He was one of the earliest to engrave on steel.

== Life ==
Davenport was born at Bedford, 10 December 1783: while he was still small, his father, an architect and surveyor, moved to London. There he was in due course articled to Charles Warren. His earlier works were book illustrations after the designs of Henry Chawner Shenton, Henry Corbould, and others; but subsequently he engraved in outline a large number of portraits for biographical works. He died 15 July 1867. His son, Samuel Thomas Davenport (born 1821), was also an engraver.

== Works ==
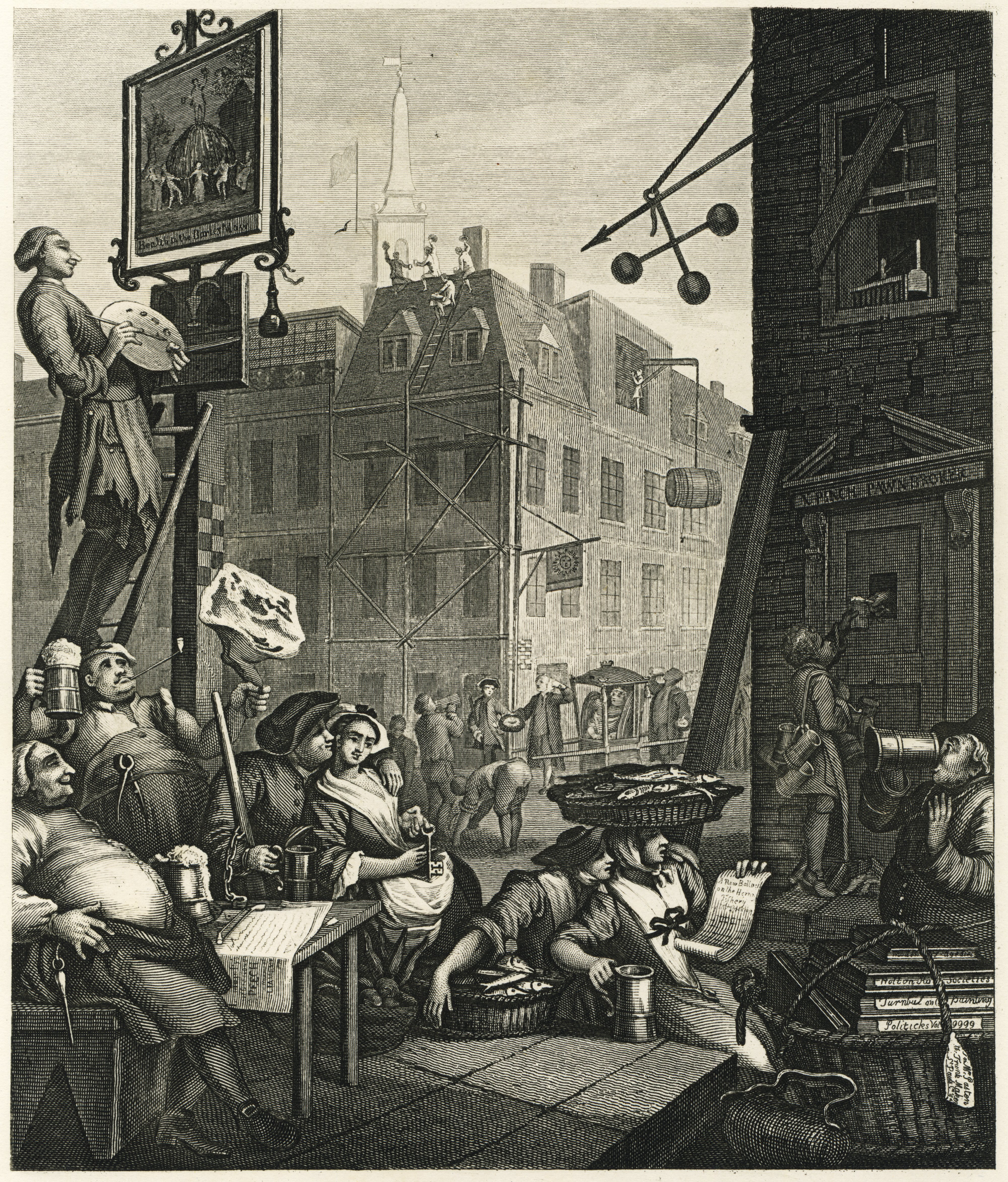
Beer Street, 1833 engraving by Samuel Davenport after William Hogarth

Davenport is said by Redgrave to have 700 portraits for one publication alone. Examples of his work are the plates which he engraved for the Forget-Me-Not annual between 1828 and 1842, and which include:

- The Sister's Dream, Fathime and Euphrosyne, and The Disappointment, after Henry Corbould;
- The Orphan Family, after Alexander Chisholm;
- The Frosty Reception and Uncle Anthony's Blunder, after Robert William Buss;
- Chains of the Heart, after John Cawse;
- Cupid caught tripping, after John Philip Davis;
- The Dance of the Peasants, from The Winter's Tale, after Robert Trewick Bone;
- Louis XI at Plessis-les-Tours, after Egide Charles Gustave Wappers; and
- Count Egmont's Jewels, after a drawing by James Holmes, from a sketch by Charles Robert Leslie.

All these plates were engraved on steel, which he was one of the earliest to adopt. He also engraved a small plate of The Infant St. John the Baptist, after Murillo.

== Notes ==
Attribution

This article incorporates text from a publication now in the public domain: Stephen, Leslie, ed. (1888). "Davenport, Samuel". Dictionary of National Biography. Vol. 14. London: Smith, Elder & Co.
