= Alehouse Act 1828 =

Act of the Parliament of the United Kingdom

Alehouse Act 1828 (Note: The citation of this act by this short title was authorised by section 1 of, and the first schedule to, the Short Titles Act 1896. Due to the repeal of those provisions it is now authorised by section 19(2) of the Interpretation Act 1978.)
- Act of Parliament
- Parliament of the United Kingdom
- Long title: An act to regulate the granting of Licences to Keepers of Inns, Alehouses, and Victualling Houses, in England.
- Citation: 9 Geo. 4. c. 61
- Territorial extent: England and Wales (Note: Section 1.)

Dates
- Royal assent: 15 July 1828
- Commencement: 10 October 1828 (Note: Section 35.)
- Repealed: 1 January 1911
Other legislation
Amends	See § Repealed enactments
Repeals/revokes	See § Repealed enactments
Amended by	Licensing Act 1872; Statute Law Revision Act 1890; Public Authorities Protection Act 1893
Repealed by	Licensing (Consolidation) Act 1910
Relates to	Beerhouse Act 1830

Status: Repealed

Text of statute as originally enacted

The Alehouse Act 1828 (9 Geo. 4. c. 61) was an act of the Parliament of the United Kingdom that consolidated enactments related to alcohol licensing in England and Wales.

== Background ==
In an effort to reduce smuggling, Parliament reversed the Gin Act 1751 (24 Geo. 2. c. 40) in 1825, and agreed to reduce the duty on spirits in England by nearly 40%. Consumption of spirits, particularly gin, rose sharply and gin shops began to develop into gin houses and gin palaces. In response, alehouses and inns also began to evolve into purpose-built commercial enterprises.

In an effort to tighten regulation of drinking establishments, Parliament enacted the act, which established general annual licensing meetings, to be held in every city, town, division, county, and riding, for the purposes of granting licences to sell exciseable liquors to be drunk on the premises.

== Provisions ==
=== Repealed enactments ===
Section 30 of the act repealed 21 enactments, listed in that section.

Citation	Short title	Description	Extent of repeal
5 & 6 Edw. 6. c. 25	Ale Houses Act 1551	An Act passed in the Fifth and Sixth Years of the Reign of King Edward the Sixth, intituled An Act for Keepers of Alehouses and Tippling Houses to be bound by Recognizances.	The whole act.
1 Jas. 1. c. 9	Inns Act 1603	An Act passed in the First Year of the Reign of King James the First, intituled An Act to restrain the inordinate haunting and tippling in Inns, Alehouses, and other Victualling Houses.	The whole act.
4 Jas. 1. c. 4	Sale of Beer Act 1606	Two Acts passed in the Fourth Year of the same Reign, the one intituled An Act to restrain the Utterance of Beer and Ale to Alehouse Keepers and Tipplers not licensed.	The whole act.
4 Jas. 1. c. 5	Drunkenness Act 1606	Two Acts passed in the Fourth Year of the same Reign, the other intituled An Act for repressing the odious and loathsome Sin of Drunkenness.	The whole act.
7 Jas. 1. c. 10	Alehouse Act 1609	An Act passed in the Seventh Year of the same Reign for the Reformation of Alehouse Keepers.	The whole act.
21 Jas. 1. c. 7	Drunkenness Act 1623	An Act passed in the Twenty-first Year of the same Reign, intituled An Act for the better repressing of Drunkenness, and restraining the inordinate haunting of Inns, Alehouses, and other Victualling Houses.	As provides, that any Person being an Alehouse Keeper, and who shall be convicted of any Offence against the said Act, shall be disabled from keeping an Alehouse for Three Years .
1 Cha. 1. c. 4	Alehouses Act 1625	An Act passed in the First Year of the Reign of King Charles the First, intituled An Act for the further Restraint of tippling in Inns, Alehouses, and other Victualling Houses.	The whole act.
3 Cha. 1. c. 4	Alehouse Act 1627	An Act passed in the Third Year of the same Reign, intituled An Act for better suppressing of unlicensed Alehouse Keepers.	The whole act.
9 Geo. 2. c. 23	Spirit Duties Act 1735	An Act passed in the Ninth Year of the Reign of King George the Second, for laying a Duty upon the retailers of Spirituous Liquors, and for licensing the Retailers thereof.	As relates to the licensing of such Retailers, and to the Conviction of Persons selling Liquors by Retail without a Licence, and to the summoning of Excise Officers, for the more easy Discovery of such Offenders.
24 Geo. 2. c. 40	Sale of Spirits Act 1750	An Act passed in the Twenty-fourth Year of the same Reign, for granting an additional Duty upon Spirituous Liquors, and other Purposes.	As relates to the Fees of Justices Clerks.
26 Geo. 2. c. 13	Tobacco Trade, etc. Act 1753	An Act passed in the Twenty-sixth Year of the same Reign or preventing the fraudulent Removal of Tobacco, and other Purposes.	As prevents Justices of the Peace in certain Cases from granting Licences.
26 Geo. 2. c. 31	Alehouses Act 1753	Another Act passed in the same Year, intituled An Act for regulating the Manner of licensing Alehouses in the Part of Great Britain called England, and for the more easy convicting Persons selling Ale and other Liquors without Licence.	The whole act.
28 Geo. 2. c. 19	Thefts, Robberies, etc. Act 1755	An Act passed in the Twenty-eighth Year of the same Reign.	As explains a Clause in the last-mentioned Act.
29 Geo. 2. c. 12	Alehouses Act 1756	An Act passed in the Twenty-ninth Year of the same Reign, intituled An Act for granting to His Majesty a Duty upon Licences for retailing Beer, Ale, and other exciseable Liquors, andfor establishing a Method for granting such Licences in Scotland, andfor allowing such Licences to be granted at a Petty Session in England, in a certain Case therein mentioned.	As relates to continuing and renewing Licences.
30 Geo. 2. c. 24	Obtaining Money by False Pretences, etc. Act 1757	An Act passed in the Thirtieth Year of the same Reign, for (among other Purposes) preventing Gaming in Public Houses by Journeymen, Labourers, Servants, and Apprentices.	As imposes a Penalty on the Keepers of Public Houses for suffering Gaming.
5 Geo. 3. c. 46	Stamp (No. 2) Act 1765	An Act passed in the Fifth Year of the Reign of King George the Third, intituled An Act for altering the Stamp Duties upon Admissions into Corporations or Companies, and for further securing and improving the Stamp Duties in Great Britain.	As requires Retailers of exciseable Liquors to exhibit their Licences, and Clerks of the Peace to deliver Lists of Persons licensed, and altering the Punishment of such Retailers selling without a Licence.
32 Geo. 3. c. 59	Licensing of Alehouses Act 1792	An Act passed in the Thirty-second Year of the same Reign, intituled An Act to amend so much of Two Acts made in the Twenty- sixth and Twenty-ninth Years of the Reign of His late Majesty King George the Second, as relates to the licensing of Alehouse Keepers and Victuallers, and for better regulating Alehouses and the Manner of granting such Licences in future, and also of granting Licences to Persons selling Wines to be drunk in their Houses.	The whole act.
38 Geo. 3. c. 54	Excise (No. 2) Act 1798	An Act passed in the Thirty-eighth Year of the same Reign, intituled An Act to amend several Laws of Excise relating to Coachmakers, Auctioneers, Beer and Cider exported, Certificates and Debentures, Stamps on Hides and Skins, Drawbacks on Wines and Sweets, and Ale and Beer Licences.	As exempts from the foregoing Penalty Persons selling eer or Ale above certain Quantities.
39 Geo. 3. c. 86	Spirit Licences Act 1799	An Act passed in the Thirty-ninth Year of the same Reign, intituled An Act for ascertaining the Rate of Duty to be paid for Retail Spirit Licences, and for authorizing the Justices of the Peace for any County to grant Licences to sell Ale, Beer, or other Liquors by Retail, in Cities and Places where a sufficient Number of Magistrates cannot be found qualified to grant such Licenses.	The whole act.
48 Geo. 3. c. 143	Duties on Certain Licences Act 1808	An Act passed in the Forty-eighth Year of the same Reign, intituled An Act to repeal the Stamp Duties on Licences granted by Justices of the Peace for selling Ale, Beer, and other exciseable Liquors by Retail, and for granting other Duties in lieu thereof.	As relates to the Form of Justices Licences, and to Justices Clerks Fees.
4 Geo. 4. c. cxxv	Middlesex Licensing of Alehouses Act 1823	An Act passed in the Fourth Year of His present Majesty's Reign, intituled An Act for altering the Time for holding General Annual Meetings for licensing Alehouses within the County ofMiddlesex, and for authorizing the Justices of the Peace for the said County to remunerate High Constables	As alters the Time for holding such Meetings, and for giving Notices of applying for Licences for Houses not before licensed.

== Subsequent developments ==
Section 30 of the act was repealed by section 2 of, and the schedule to, the Public Authorities Protection Act 1893 (56 & 57 Vict. c. 61), which came into force on 1 January 1894.

The whole act was repealed by section 112 of, and the seventh schedule to, the Licensing (Consolidation) Act 1910 (10 Edw. 7 & 1 Geo. 5. c. 24), which came into force on 1 January 1911.

== Bibliography ==
- Crispe Whiteley, George (1874). The Licensing Acts 1872–74. Knight & Company.
