= Gin Act 1751 =

Act of the Parliament of Great Britain

Sale of Spirits Act 1750 (Note: The citation of this act by this short title was authorised by section 1 of, and the first schedule to, the Short Titles Act 1896. Due to the repeal of those provisions it is now authorised by section 19(2) of the Interpretation Act 1978.)
- Act of Parliament
- Parliament of Great Britain
- Long title: An Act for granting to his Majesty an additional Duty upon Spirituous Liquors, and upon Licences for retailing the same; and for repealing the Act of the twentieth year of his present Majesty's Reign, intituled, "An Act for granting a Duty to his Majesty to be paid by Distillers upon Licences to be taken out by them for retailing Spirituous Liquors; and for the more effectually restraining the Retailing of distilled Spirituous Liquors; and for allowing a Drawback upon the Exportation of British made Spirits; and that the Parish of St. Mary le Bon, in the County of Middlesex, shall be under the Inspection of the Head Office of Excise."
- Citation: 24 Geo. 2. c. 40
- Territorial extent: Great Britain

Dates
- Royal assent: 25 June 1751
- Commencement: 1 July 1751 (Note: Section 1.)
- Repealed: 27 April 1965 (Note: The Administration of Justice Act 1965 (Commencement No. 1) Order 1965.)
Other legislation
Amends	Distillers Act 1746
Amended by	Gaols Act 1823; Alehouse Act 1828; Sale of Spirits Act 1862; Statute Law Revision Act 1867; Statute Law Revision Act 1887; Statute Law Revision Act 1888; National Assistance Act 1948
Repealed by	Administration of Justice Act 1965
Relates to	Spirits Act 1742

Status: Repealed

Text of statute as originally enacted

The Sale of Spirits Act 1750 (24 Geo. 2. c. 40) (commonly known as the Gin Act 1751) was an act of the Parliament of Great Britain which was enacted in order to reduce the consumption of gin and other distilled spirits, a popular pastime that was regarded as one of the primary causes of crime in London. By prohibiting gin distillers from selling to unlicensed merchants and increasing fees charged to merchants, it eliminated small gin shops, thereby restricting the distribution of gin to larger distillers and retailers in the Kingdom of Great Britain.

== History ==
The Funeral Procession of Madam Geneva (reissue of a 1736 print) — a half-naked beggar leads a long procession of publicans to the churchyard of St Giles, London. Ragged street people buy gin by the glass. One pub has an enormous stock of spirits that it cannot sell, and idle prostitutes who cannot find customers. Further disorder is suggested by two women fighting; upturned carts; a shoe-black who has abandoned his tools; and the stocks.

First imported from the Netherlands in the 1690s, gin began to rival beer as the most popular drink in the Kingdom of England. In 1689, the English government opened the distilling trade to all English people who paid certain taxes. Over the next sixty years, however, the government regulated the sale of gin with inconsistent taxation policy. The ready availability and low cost of gin led to a massive rise in alcohol consumption in England, which became historically known as the "Gin Craze"; by the 1730s, consumption in London had risen to the equivalent of 2 pints (1.1 litres) per week per Londoner.

Politicians and religious leaders argued that gin drinking encouraged laziness and criminal behaviour. Parliament passed the Taxation (No. 2) Act 1728 (2 Geo. 2. c. 17) which increased the retail tax to 5 shillings per gallon. With the Gin Act 1736 (9 Geo. 2. c. 23) the government imposed a high license fee for gin retailers and a 20 shillings retail tax per gallon. These actions were unpopular with the working-classes and resulted in riots in London in 1743. The license fee and tax were lowered significantly within a few years.

== Provisions ==
Printed satire on the Gin Act (W. Proud, 1752), showing the discarding of 400 imp gal (1,800 L) of spirits in the Ratcliffe Highway for sale without a licence: a mock-tragic caption quotes Lamentations 1:12, Is it nothing to you, all ye that pass by? Look and see if there be any sorrow like unto my sorrow? One innkeeper is reduced to penury by the loss of his stock, while another is overjoyed: he has a license and has now lost his competitor. A French onlooker is disgusted by the scene. A drunken Lady Justice leans on her sword for support.

The act prohibited gin distillers from selling to unlicensed merchants, restricted retail licenses to substantial property holders and charged high fees to those merchants eligible for retail licenses. To offer the masses another invigorating (and non-alcoholic) beverage the import of tea was also encouraged. Also, men were encouraged to drink beer.

== Subsequent developments ==
So much of the act "as relates to the Fees of Justices Clerks" was repealed by section 30 of the Alehouse Act 1828 (9 Geo. 4. c. 61), which came into force on 10 October 1828.

The whole act was repealed by section 34(1) of, and schedule 2 to, the Administration of Justice Act 1965. The Administration of Justice Act 1965 (Commencement No. 1) Order 1965 (SI 1965/706) provided that this repeal would take effect on 27 April 1965.

== See also ==
- Gin Craze
- Beer Street and Gin Lane
