= Mary Edwards (1705–1743) =

English heiress and art patron (d. 1743)

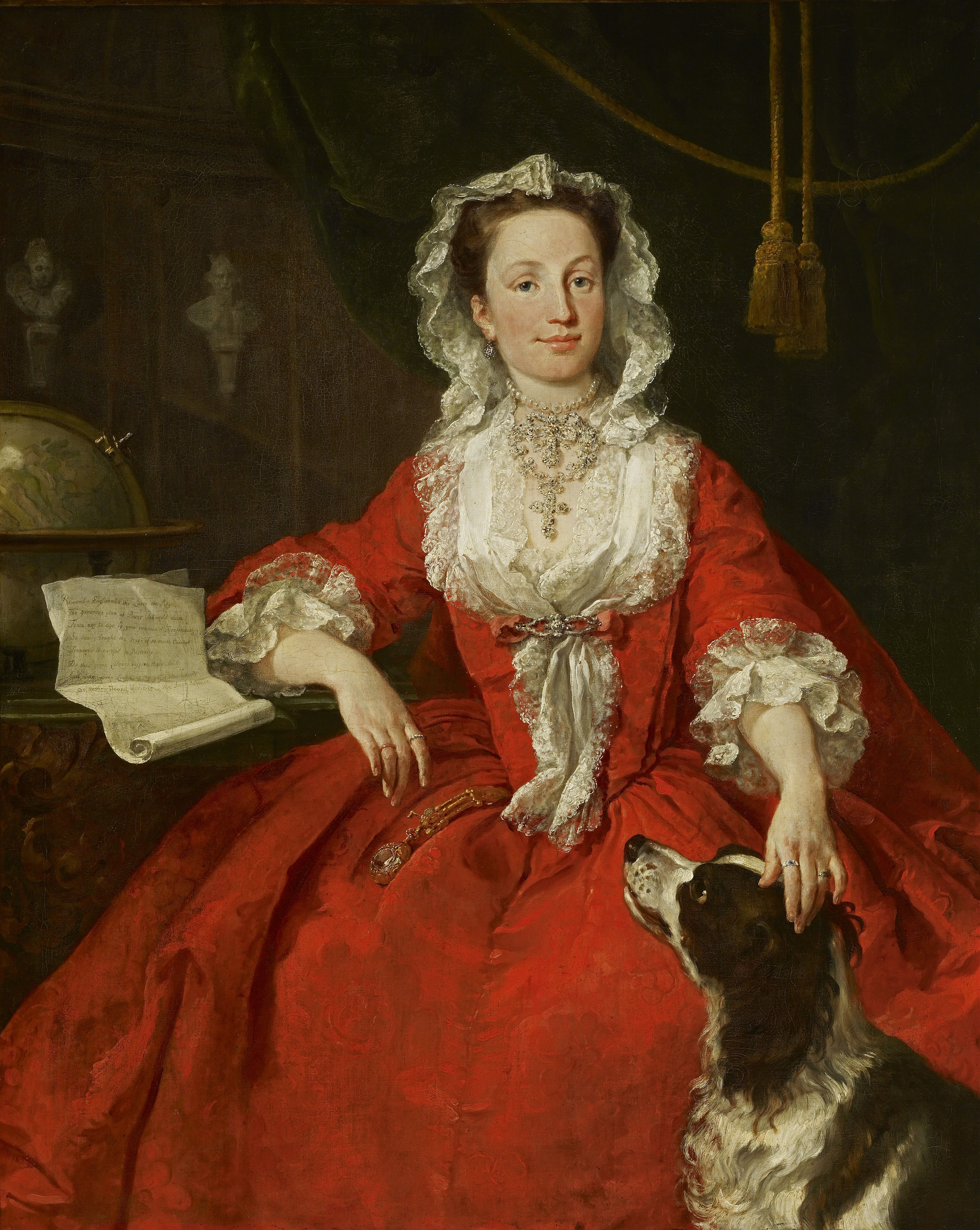
- By William Hogarth
- Born: 1704–1705; London
- Died: 23 August 1743 (aged 38–39); London
- Occupation: Businesswoman
- Known for: "the richest woman in England"

Mary Edwards (c. 1704 – 23 August 1743) was an English heiress and art patron who was said to be the richest woman in England. She reportedly married but later tried to remove any evidence of the ceremony. She lived with Lord Anne Hamilton for several years and they had a child, but he married again, without a divorce.

== Life ==
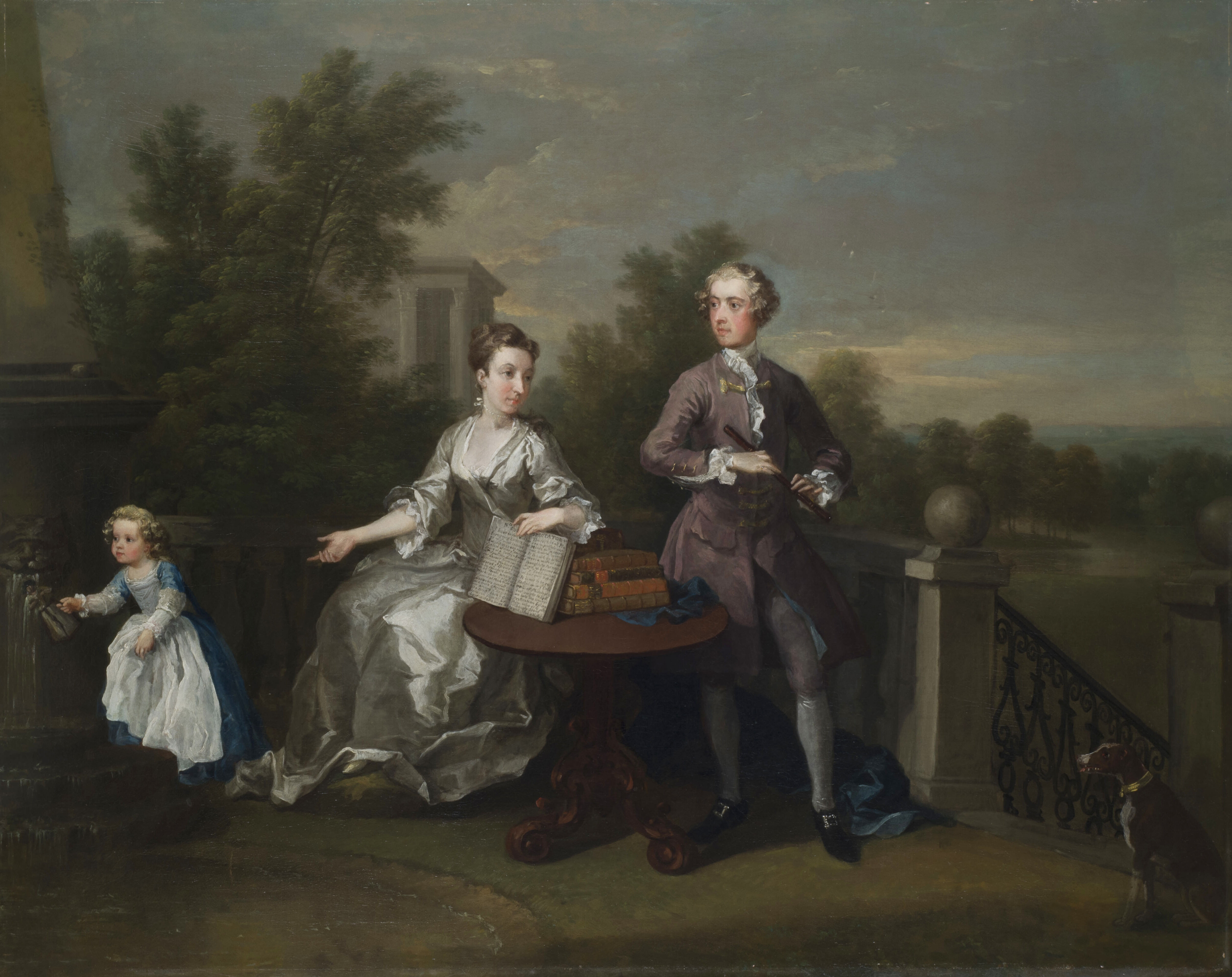
Edwards Hamilton Family on a Terrace (William Hogarth, 1734)

Edwards was probably born in London in about 1704 or 1705. Her mother came from the Dutch family who had drained the fens and her father, Francis Edwards (d. 1729), a member of the landed gentry, owned lands in Leicestershire, Northamptonshire, London & Middlesex, Essex, Hertfordshire and Kent and he had shares in the New River Company in Islington. Her father died in 1729 and as there was no will then his riches would be left to his widow and her mother Anna Margaretta Vernatti. However her mother renounced her claim and passed on the estate to Mary. Her fortune at the age of about 23 was estimated to be between £50,000 and £60,000 per annum (about £8m in 2021), which made Mary the richest woman in Britain.

She fell in love with Lord Anne Hamilton and reputedly married him in or before 1731, in a clandestine marriage said to have been in the chapel of the Fleet Prison. It was reported in The Gentleman's Magazine but the chapel records do not (now) include details and Mary Edwards recanted the marriage and never used his surname. Lord Anne assumed Mary Edwards' name and arms as Lord Anne Edwards Hamilton. In 1734 William Hogarth painted a family portrait of them with their son Gerard Anne Edwards. They later separated because Lord Anne was becoming spendthrift with his "wife's" fortune, and Mary Edwards took the extraordinary step of repudiating her marriage, declared herself a single woman and took steps to create evidence that no marriage had taken place. Their child, Gerard Anne Edwards, became illegitimate, but this appears to have been planned as his 1733 baptism records his surname as Edwards and his mother as single.

In 1742 she was again painted by Hogarth—the painting is now in the Frick collection. The portrait reflects Edwards's status and headstrong character; it uses many of the signs of power usually reserved for paintings of men. She shows her wealth with many diamonds, is shown with a large hunting hound rather than a lady-like lapdog, and in the background are portraits of Alfred the Great and Queen Elizabeth I, important in English history. The paper behind her is a proclamation of individual rights from Joseph Addison's 1712 play Cato.

Edwards had a close friendship with Hogarth, and commissioned some of his most important works. She became an important patron of the arts, breaking with conformity. Mary Edwards commissioned Hogarth's 1733 Southwark Fair, and his 1742 painting Taste in High Life, which lampoons the extravagant fashion of the day and overspending.

In October 1742 her "husband" married Anna Powell, and there was no charge of bigamy. The ODNB cites this as evidence that although she lived with Lord Anne Hamilton and had a child they were never legally married.

== Death and legacy ==
Edwards died in Kensington in 1743 and she was buried simply but beside her father in St Andrews Church in Welham. She had taken great care with the education of her son Gerard Anne Edwards (1734–1773), and she transferred all her wealth to him. In 1754 he married Lady Jane Noel, daughter of Baptist Noel, 4th Earl of Gainsborough of the first creation. They were the parents of Sir Gerard Noel, 2nd Baronet, ancestor of the Earls of Gainsborough of the second creation.
