= Gin Act 1743 =

Act of the Parliament of Great Britain

Spirits Act 1742 (Note: The citation of this act by this short title was authorised by section 1 of, and the first schedule to, the Short Titles Act 1896. Due to the repeal of those provisions it is now authorised by section 19(2) of the Interpretation Act 1978.)
- Act of Parliament
- Parliament of Great Britain
- Long title: An Act for repealing certain Duties on Spirituous Liquors, and on Licences for retailing the same, and for laying other Duties on Spirituous Liquors, and on Licences to retail the said Liquors.
- Citation: 16 Geo. 2. c. 8
- Territorial extent: Great Britain

Dates
- Royal assent: 22 March 1743
- Commencement: 16 November 1742 (Note: Start of session.)
- Repealed: 30 July 1948
Other legislation
Amends	Gin Act 1736
Amended by	Supply, etc. Act 1743
Repealed by	Statute Law Revision Act 1867; Statute Law Revision Act 1948
Relates to	Sale of Spirits Act 1750

Status: Repealed

Text of statute as originally enacted

The Spirits Act 1742 (16 Geo. 2. c. 8), commonly known as the Gin Act 1743, was an act of the Parliament of Great Britain that repealed the Gin Act 1736 (9 Geo. 2. c. 7) in favour of lower taxes and licence fees.

== Background ==
The Gin Act 1736 (9 Geo. 2. c. 7) attempted to curb gin consumption by instituting a 20 shilling per gallon excise tax as well as a £50 annual license (equivalent to £9,000 today) for all gin sellers. The law proved immensely unpopular and provoked public rioting and widespread defiance. It is said that only two of the annual licenses were ever purchased and many people turned to producing homemade gins.

In light of the difficulty in enforcing the law (and the financial strain of the War of the Austrian Succession), the act reduced the cost of an annual gin-selling license from £50 to just 20 shillings. The excise tax on gin producers and penalties for violating the law were also significantly reduced.

== Subsequent developments ==
The question of taxing and regulating gin was later revisited by the Gin Act 1751 (24 Geo. 2. c. 40), which revoked this act.

The whole act except section 12 to "Persons only." was repealed by section 1 of, and the schedule to, the Statute Law Revision Act 1874 (37 & 38 Vict. c. 35), which came into force on 16 July 1874.

The whole act, so far as unrepealed, was repealed by section 1 of, and the first schedule to, the Statute Law Revision Act 1948 (11 & 12 Geo. 6. c. 62), which came into force on 30 July 1948.
