= Gin Act 1736 =

Act of the Parliament of Great Britain

- Act of Parliament
- Parliament of Great Britain
- Long title: An Act for laying a Duty upon the Retalers of Spirituous Liquors, and for licensing the Retalers thereof.
- Citation: 9 Geo. 2. c. 23
- Territorial extent: Great Britain

Dates
- Royal assent: 5 May 1736
- Commencement: 30 September 1736 (Note: Section 1.)
- Repealed: 15 July 1867

Other legislation
- Amended by: Gin Act 1743; Alehouse Act 1828
- Repealed by: Statute Law Revision Act 1867

Status: Repealed

Text of statute as originally enacted

The Spirit Duties Act 1735 (9 Geo. 2. c. 23), commonly known as the Gin Act 1736, was an act of the Parliament of Great Britain that established a retail tax on gin and annual licenses for gin sellers. Designed to curb gin consumption, the law was widely disobeyed and then repealed in 1743.

== Background ==
Gin consumption in the United Kingdom increased markedly during the late 17th and early 18th centuries during the Gin Craze. As consumption continued to grow, gin began to be blamed for a variety of social ills including crime, prostitution and mental illness.

Pushed forward by social reformers such as Joseph Jekyll, the act attempted to curb gin consumption by instituting a 20 shilling per gallon excise tax as well as a £50 annual license (equivalent to £9,000 today) for all gin sellers. Passed in 1735, it was set to take effect in September 1736. The law proved immensely unpopular and provoked public rioting. King George II issued a proclamation requiring compliance with the law and an end to public disorder against it. After just a year, though, enforcement began to wane and the public began to defy the law more openly. It is said that only two of the annual licenses were ever purchased. Moonshine also became widespread as people produced their own gins, sometimes using dangerous ingredients such as turpentine and sulfuric acid.

== Subsequent developments ==
By 1743, gin production had actually increased to an all-time high of 8 million imperial gallons (36 million litres) and enforcement of the law was considered impossible. The financial strain of the War of the Austrian Succession also played a role as the government sought a solution which would generate more income. The act was virtually repealed by the Gin Act 1743 (16 Geo. 2. c. 8) which set much lower taxes and fees.

So much of the act "as relates to the licensing of such Retailers, and to the Conviction of Persons selling Liquors by Retail without a Licence, and to the summoning of Excise Officers, for the more easy Discovery of such Offenders" was repealed by section 30 of the Alehouse Act 1828 (9 Geo. 4. c. 61), which came into force on 10 October 1828.

The whole act was repealed by section 1 of, and the schedule to, the Statute Law Revision Act 1873 (36 & 37 Vict. c. 91), which came into force on 5 August 1873.
