= Alcohol licensing laws of the United Kingdom =

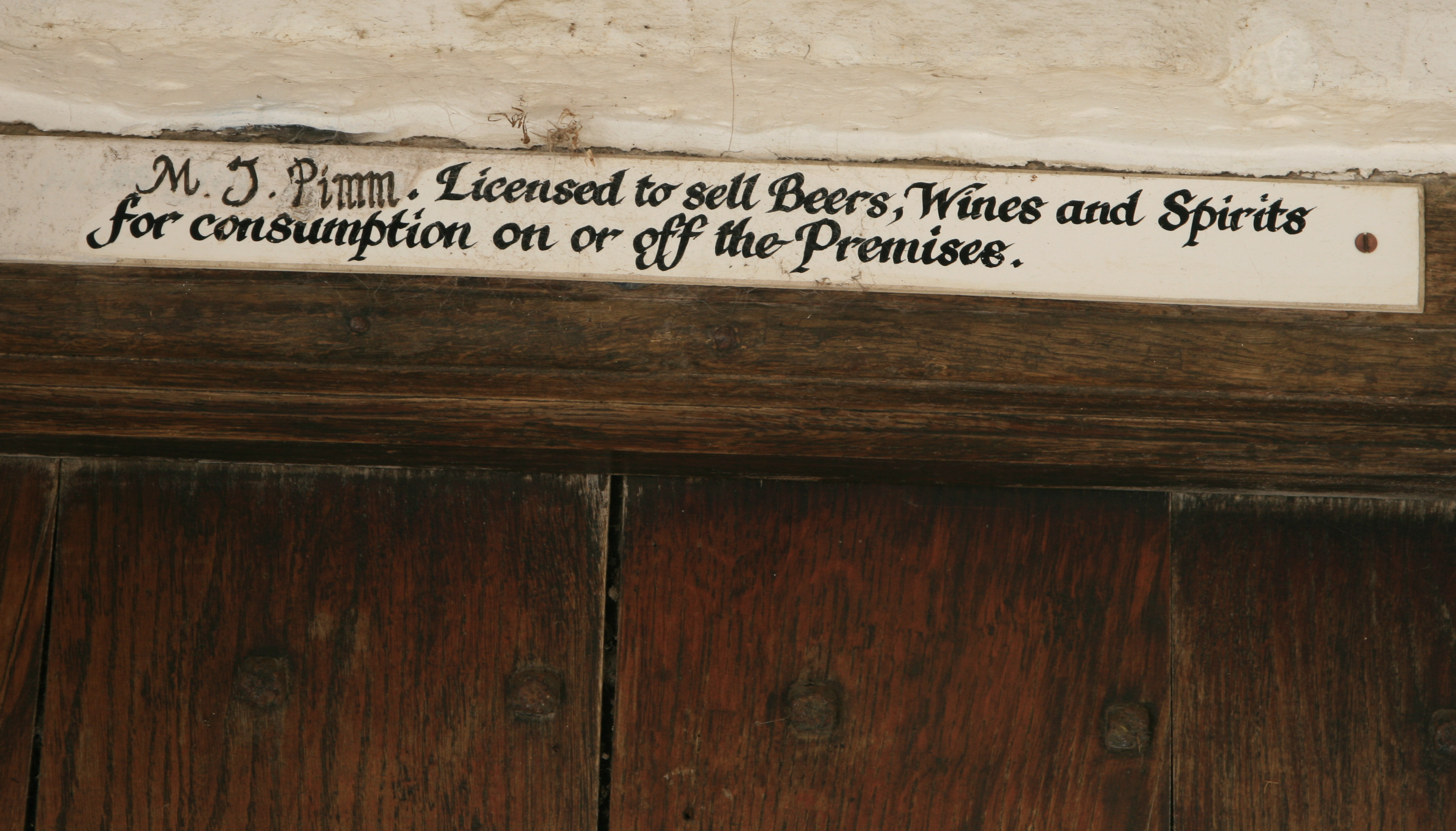
Licensing notice displayed above the entrance of a pub (no longer required since November 2005)

The alcohol licensing laws of the United Kingdom regulate the sale and consumption of alcohol, with separate legislation for England and Wales, (Note: The sale and supply of alcohol, in relation to Wales, is a reserved matter under schedule 7A of the Government of Wales Act 2006.) Northern Ireland and Scotland being passed, as necessary, by the UK Parliament, the Northern Ireland Assembly and the Scottish Parliament respectively.

Throughout the United Kingdom, the sale of alcohol is restricted—pubs, restaurants, shops and other premises must be licensed by the local authority. In England, Wales and Scotland, the authority to sell alcohol is divided into two parts—the Premises Licence, which prescribes the times and conditions under which alcohol may be sold, and a Personal Licence, which allows individuals to sell alcohol or authorise its sale by others. Every Premises Licence that authorises the sale of alcohol must also name a Designated Premises Supervisor (DPS), or Designated Premises Manager (DPM) in Scotland, who must hold a valid Personal Licence—otherwise alcohol may not be sold on those premises. The DPS has day-to-day responsibility for the sale of alcohol on licensed premises. Premises Licences, insofar as they concern the sale of alcohol, can be categorised to include on-licences (allowing consumption of alcohol on the premises) and off-licences. However, these distinctions are not explicitly made in the Licensing Act 2003 and the position in Scotland and Northern Ireland is more complex. Many on-licensed premises also permit off-sales.

The minimum age at which people are legally allowed to purchase alcohol is 18. Adults purchasing alcohol on behalf of a person under 18 in a pub or from an off-licence are potentially liable to prosecution alongside the vendor.

However, legislation does allow for the consumption of alcohol by those under 18 in the following circumstances:

1. The individual is aged 5 or older and is at home or on other private premises—except in Scotland, where there is no longer a minimum age for alcohol consumption.
2. The individual is aged 16 or 17 and the alcohol, which may be beer, wine or cider only, is consumed with a table meal.

The person making the purchase must be at least 18 years old. Before 2003, children aged 5 and over were legally allowed to drink alcohol in a beer garden, but not in the bar area of licensed premises, as long as the drink had been bought by an adult.

The Licensing Act 2003 thoroughly revised and consolidated into one act all the many separate legislative provisions that previously covered licensed premises in England and Wales. The Licensing (Scotland) Act 2005 brought the same reforms to Scotland.

The same reforms have been proposed for Northern Ireland but have not been enacted; sale of alcohol there remains more strictly regulated than in Great Britain.

== History ==
=== Medieval period ===
A mention of 'ealu wæge' (ale-cup) in Beowulf, an Old English epic poem from early medieval England

Within the British Isles, records show that ale was consumed in huge quantities without regulation throughout the medieval period. In 1272, a husband and wife who retired at Selby Abbey in North Yorkshire were provided with 2 imp gal (9.1 L; 2.4 US gal) of ale per day along with two loaves of white bread and one loaf of brown bread. This was because beer was an important source of nutrition in medieval England. At the start of 14th century, it ranked alongside pottage and bread as one of three main sources of grain in the diet. Grains accounted for around 80% of the calorie intake of agricultural workers. Even the nobility received around 65% of their calories from grains.

Everyone, including children, drank small beer, which was also known as table beer or mild beer. This was a highly nutritious beverage that contained just enough alcohol to act as a preservative. It also provided hydration without the intoxicating effects of drunkenness. In the 1520s, brewers in Coventry produced 2,860,000 L (630,000 imp gal; 760,000 US gal) of small beer per annum. By the 17th century in England, small beer was an excise class, which was determined by its wholesale price.

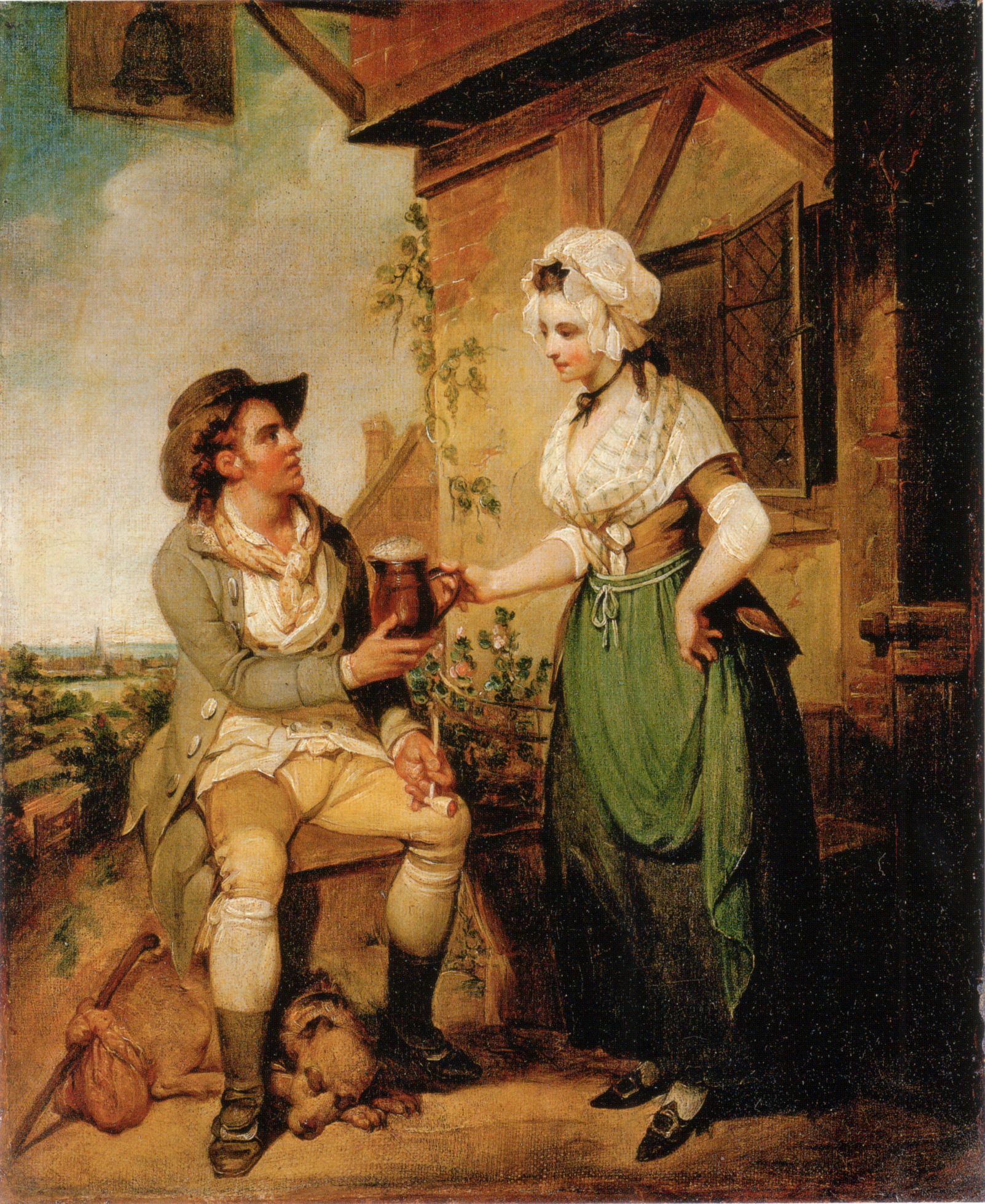
"The Ale-House Door" (Henry Singleton, c. 1790)

Small beer remained socially acceptable throughout 18th-century England because its lower alcohol content permitted people to drink several glasses without becoming drunk. William Hogarth's 1751 portrait Beer Street shows a group of happy workers going about their business after drinking table beer. It remained popular during the 19th century as the drink of choice for families and servants.

The lower cost for proprietors combined with the lower taxes levied on small beer inevitably led to the selling of some beer labelled "strong beer" that had actually been diluted with small beer.

=== First legislative controls ===
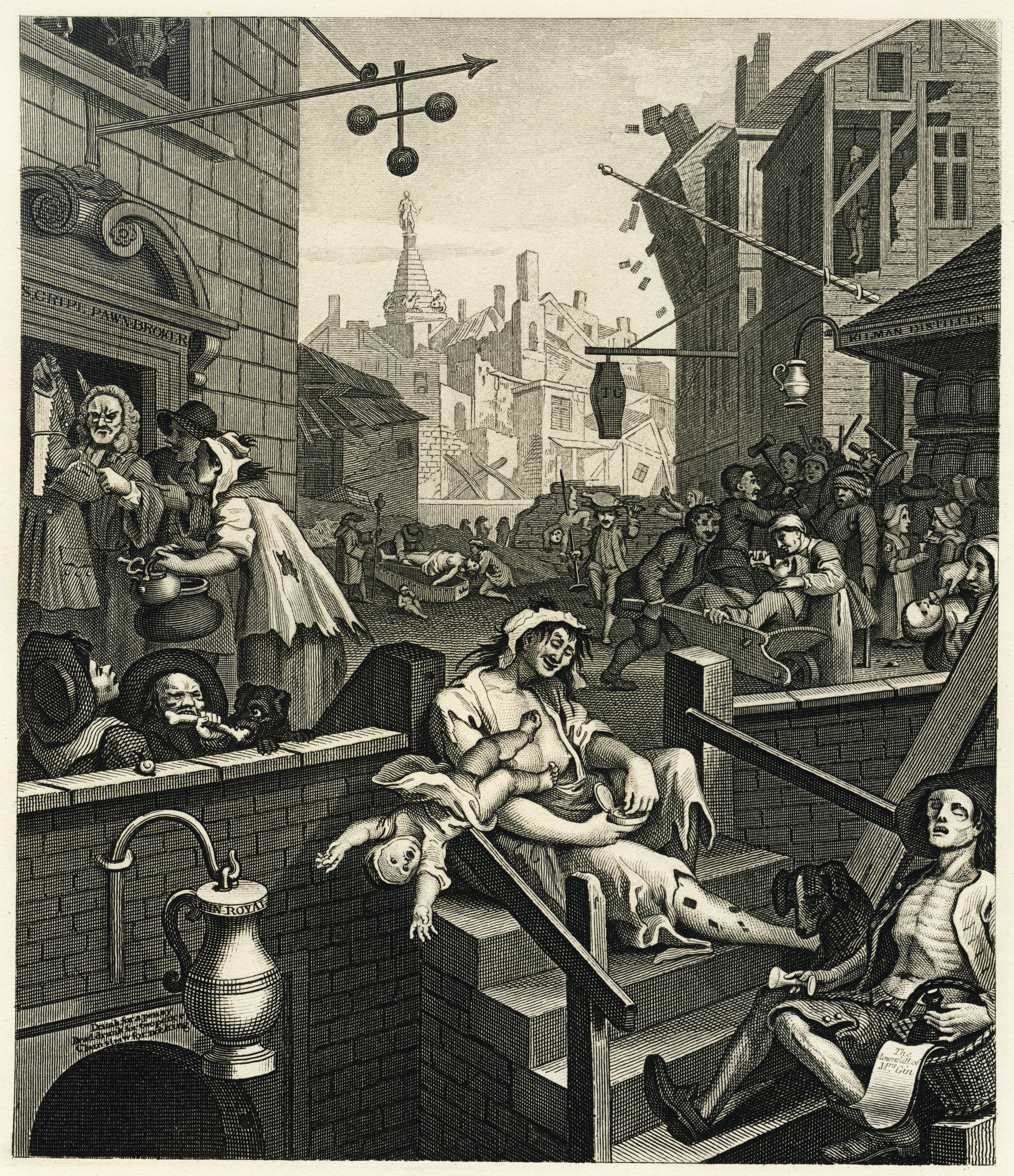
Hogarth's Gin Lane, 1750

Late in the 17th century, the government enacted a range of measures aimed at restricting brandy imports and encouraging domestic gin production. As a result, gin consumption rose sharply and by 1740 half of the 15,000 drinking establishments in London were gin-shops. This period came to be known as the "Gin Craze". In an attempt to bring the situation under control, Parliament passed five major acts aimed at reducing the consumption of gin:

- The Taxation (No. 2) Act 1728 (2 Geo. 2. c. 17), passed in 1729
- The Gin Act 1736 (9 Geo. 2. c. 23) imposed a prohibitively high duty on gin but caused rioting, so the duty was gradually reduced and then abolished by the Gin Act 1743 (16 Geo. 2. c. 8).
- The Distillers Act 1746 (20 Geo. 2. c. 39), passed in 1747
- The Gin Act 1751 (24 Geo. 2. c. 40), passed in 1751, was more successful: instead of a tax it restricted gin producers to selling to licensed premises only.

The Universities (Wine Licences) Act 1743 (17 Geo. 2. c. 40) was enacted (not repealed until the passing of Licensing Act 2003) to control the supply and sale of wine within the precincts of British educational establishments.

=== Implementation of restrictions ===
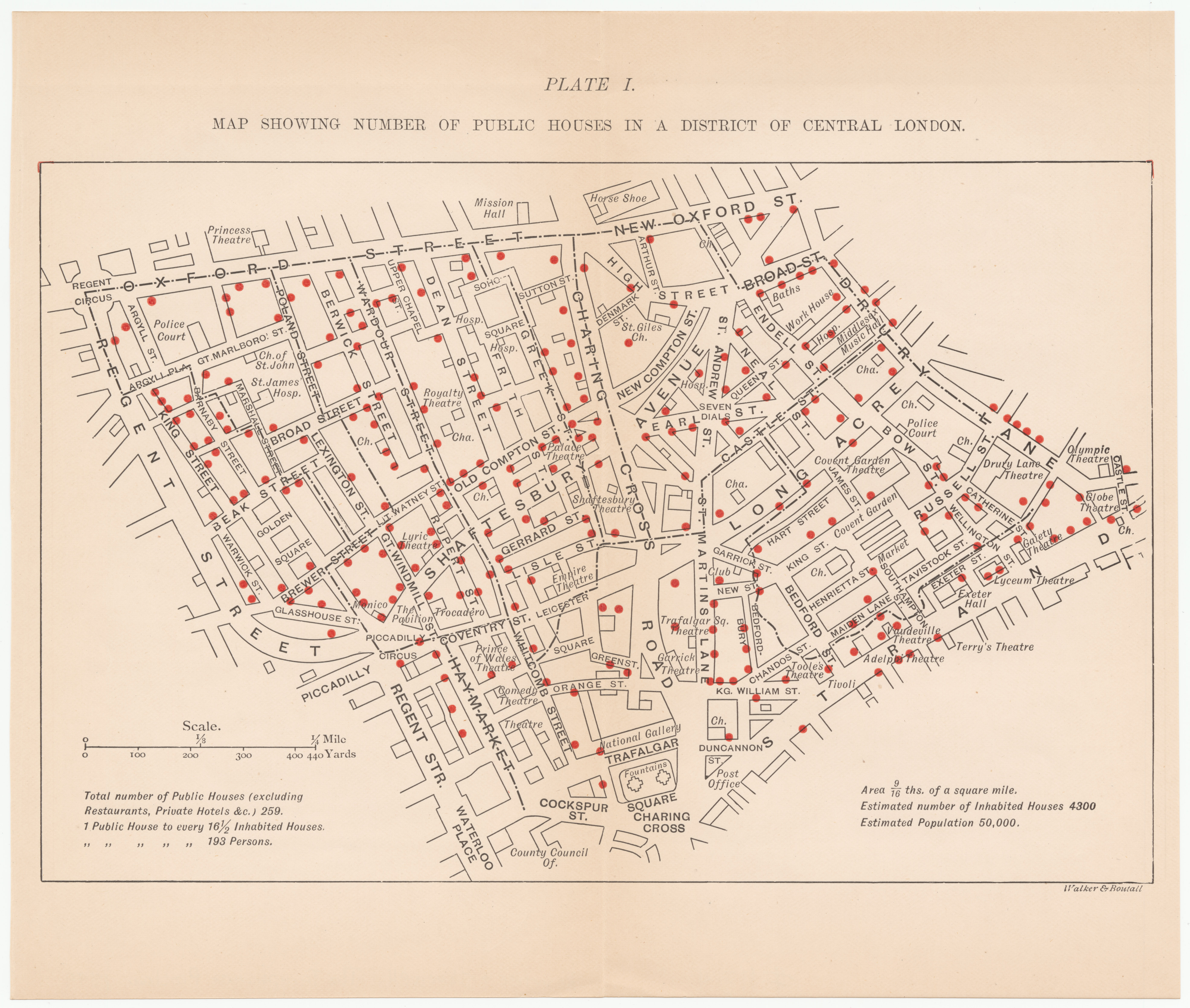
Map showing the number of public houses in a district of Central London in 1899

During the 19th century, licensing laws began to restrict the opening hours of premises. The Sunday Closing (Wales) Act 1881 required the closure of all public houses in Wales on Sundays.

With the outbreak of First World War, the UK Parliament passed the Defence of the Realm Act 1914 (4 & 5 Geo. 5. c. 29). One section of the act concerned the hours pubs could sell alcohol, since it was believed that alcohol consumption would interfere with the war effort. Licensed premises were restricted to opening for luncheon (11:00 or 12:00 to 14:40 or 15:00, depending on the region) and supper (17:30 or 18:30 to 22:30).

The restrictions on serving alcohol in the UK continued after the war. In 1921, the wartime restrictions were extended indefinitely with the passing of the Licensing Act 1921. The law meant that pubs in urban areas could open between 11.30am and 3pm and between 6.30pm and 11pm. Pubs outside urban areas could open between 11.30am and 3pm but only between 6.30pm and 10pm after that. Sunday opening times were limited to a maximum of five hours divided between 12 noon–3pm and 6pm–10pm. All licensed premises in Wales and Monmouthshire were banned from opening on Sundays. However, private members' clubs were permitted to set their own opening times according to their own club by-laws after obtaining permission to serve alcohol from the relevant licensing justices of a licensing district. Two years later, the first woman MP in the UK Parliament, Nancy Astor, got her bill, the Intoxicating Liquor (Sale to Persons under Eighteen) Act 1923, passed into UK law. It still remains an offence to serve alcohol to anyone aged under 18 in the UK.

The law did not change in the UK through the interwar period, Second World War and post-war period. One of the reasons that restrictions were not lifted, despite a Royal Commission in 1929–31 looking into Licensing in the British Isles, was the pervasive attitude that public houses in general were "disreputable drinking dens".

Licensing Act 1961 (Note: Section 38(1).)
- Act of Parliament
- Parliament of the United Kingdom
- Long title: An Act to amend the Licensing Act, 1953, to make further provision about the sale and supply of intoxicating liquor and about licensed premises, and for purposes connected therewith.
- Citation: 9 & 10 Eliz. 2. c. 61
- Territorial extent: England and Wales (Note: Section 38(4).)

Dates
- Royal assent: 3 August 1961
- Commencement: various (Note: Section 38(5). The Licensing Act 1961 (Commencement) Order 1961 (SI 1961/1670).)
- Repealed: 1 January 1965
Other legislation
Amends	Civic Restaurants Act 1947; Licensing Act 1953
Amended by	London Government Act 1963
Repealed by	Licensing Act 1964

Status: Repealed

Text of statute as originally enacted

In the 1960s, several new licence bills were enacted into UK law. One defined what sort of places, such as bars, pubs, restaurants, hotels and clubs, could serve alcohol. Another made it an offence to sell alcohol on any premises without first obtaining a licence from a licensing authority (such as a local magistrate). However, none of these new acts changed the times that alcohol could be served.

=== Repeal of restrictive laws ===
It was not until Scotland became the first part of the UK to repeal the times people could drink that the law had changed for more than 50 years. When the new licensing laws of the Licensing (Scotland) Act 1976 came into effect in 1977, local authorities in Scotland were given the powers to determine opening hours.

More than 10 years later, the restrictive licensing laws were repealed in England and Wales with the passing of the Licensing Act 1988. On 22 August 1988, for the first time for almost 75 years, British pubs were permitted to remain open through the day; uninterrupted consumption of alcohol was allowed on premises from 11:00 until 23:00, except on Sundays, where they were allowed to open for only an extra hour until 15:00 compared to the previous laws. In November 2005, revised rules were introduced that scrapped hour limits. All pubs were allowed to apply for licences as permissive as "24 hours a day".

Traditionally, the phrase "Last orders!" is still often used to announce the last opportunity to purchase drinks, typically ten or fifteen minutes in advance, and is often announced via a bell. At the point when the bar will no longer serve drinks, the bar staff will announce "Time, please!" (traditionally "Time, gentlemen, please!"), again either shouted or by use of a bell.

== Regulatory licences ==
=== On-licence ===
On-licence describes an establishment where alcohol must be consumed at the point of sale, such as a pub, bar nightclub or café.

The name derives from the distinction between types of licence that could be granted—a distinction now repealed in England and Wales and repealed in Scotland in 2009. In England and Wales, the magistrates would formerly grant either an "off" licence, permitting the sale of intoxicating liquor for consumption only off the premises, or an "on" licence, permitting sale for consumption on the premises—which permitted, to a limited extent, off sales, too: many public houses were permitted off sales, to sell sealed alcoholic drinks (e.g. unopened bottles of wine) for consumption elsewhere. A restaurant licence was an on-licence with a restaurant condition attached. Until 2009 in Scotland, the types of licence were Hotel, Public House, Restricted Hotel, Restaurant, Entertainment, Off-Sale and Refreshment licences. In Northern Ireland there are numerous types of licence.

Under the Licensing Act 2003 and the Licensing (Scotland) Act 2005, there is only one type of Premises Licence, though the conditions placed on each one will determine whether on sales or off sales (or both) are permitted.

The Premises Licence is granted to a person and not to the establishment. Before the Licensing Act 2003 came into effect, there was a legal requirement to display the name of the licensee above the entrance to an on-licence location. The sign would typically say "[name of landlord] licensed for the sale of alcoholic beverages for consumption on the premises". Under the 2003 Act, that requirement was repealed, although such signs are still often seen. Instead,the Premises Licence-holder must ensure that the official summary of the licence (or a certified copy) is prominently displayed on the premises as well as the name and position of any person nominated as the custodian of the summary Premises Licence.

=== Off-licence ===
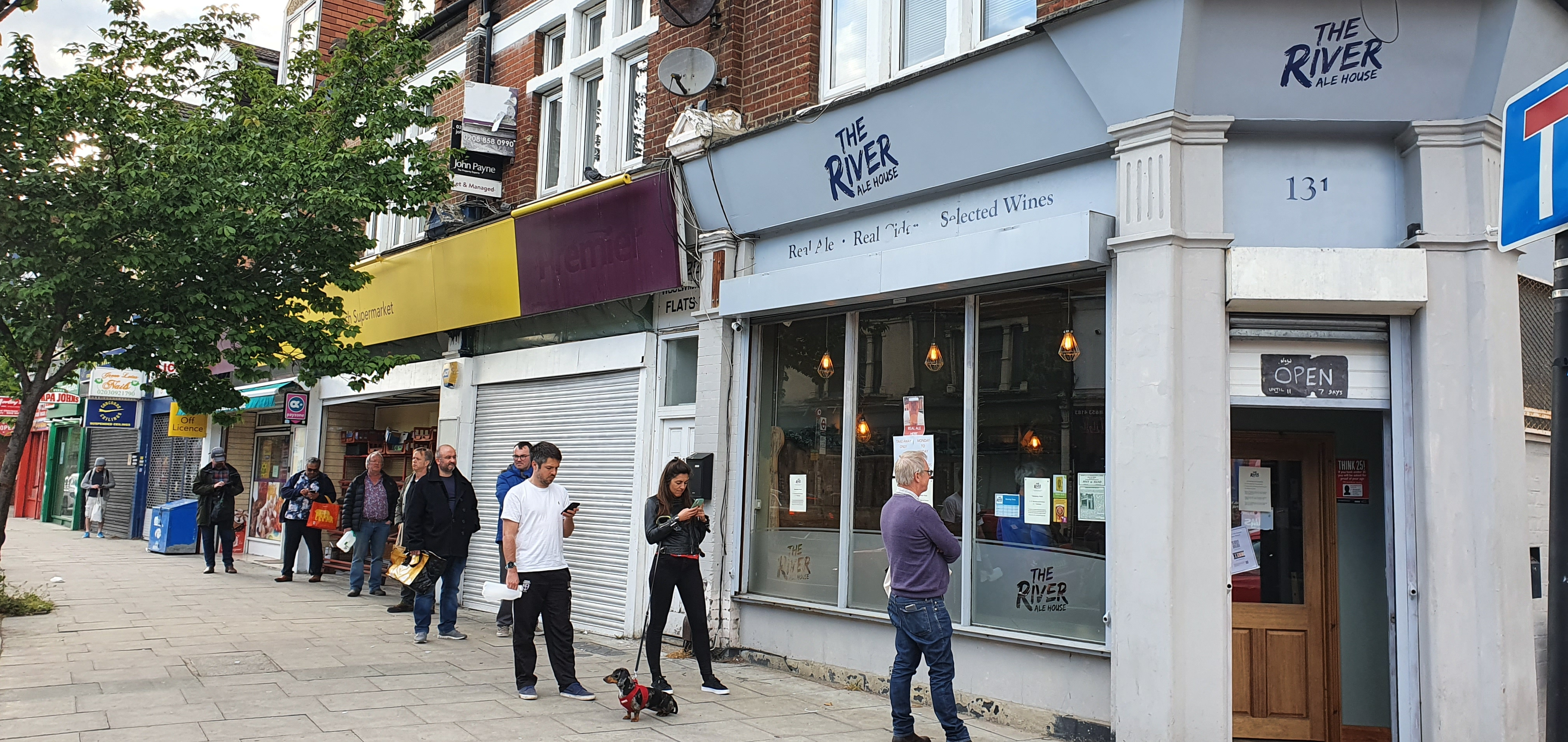
People queuing to buy takeaway beer in London on 1 May 2020, during the COVID-19 pandemic

Off-licence (sometimes known as off-sales or informally offie) is a term used in the United Kingdom and Ireland for a shop licensed to sell alcoholic beverages for consumption off the premises, as opposed to a bar or public house, which is licensed for consumption at the point of sale (on-licence). The term also applies to the licence granted to the establishment itself.

Off-licences are typically specialist shops, convenience stores, parts of supermarkets and attached to bars and pubs. Prices are usually substantially lower than in bars or pubs.

In the United Kingdom, the off-licence status of a shop could once be used as a device to circumvent restrictive trading laws, particularly those concerning Sunday trading. Depending on local by-laws, shops might either be required to close at midday once a week or else not be allowed to trade in the evening. Shops with an off-licence made their hours similar to those of public houses, opening during lunch hours and from early evening to the mandatory closing time, usually 10:30pm or 11:00pm. The Sunday Trading Act 1994 exempted liquor stores (and any shops that sells alcohol) from its effects. The mandatory closing time for any licensed liquor stores is regulated by Licensing Act 2003 instead.

During the COVID-19 pandemic in the United Kingdom, all pubs closed during the lockdown from 20 March 2020. However, on 25 March, off-licences were added to the list of essential businesses allowed to stay open, also enabling pubs and brewery taprooms with licences to sell beer for home consumption to offer takeaway sales and home deliveries.

== Regional UK licensing ==
=== Northern Ireland ===
In Northern Ireland, legislation is more restrictive than in Great Britain—a reaction to social problems at the beginning of the 20th century. Only a limited number of licences is available for pubs and off-licences; any new pub or off-licence wanting to sell alcohol must wait until an existing one surrenders its licence (known as the surrender principle).

Licences are granted and administered by the courts, not elected local authorities; the courts have no guidance to assist in the practical application of the law. A new licence is granted by the County Court and will be granted only on the surrender principle and only if the court is satisfied that the existing number of licensed premises is not already adequate (the need principle). The transfer of a licence is a matter for the magistrates' courts.

There are currently twelve categories of premises that may be licensed to sell alcohol, among which are pubs, off-licences and certain businesses for which the sale of alcohol is necessary to the main business.

Licensing proposals in Northern Ireland were first announced by the Northern Ireland Office in 2004, leading to a consultation in 2005, again very similar to the Scottish and English Acts. The proposals triggered much initial opposition, even from some parts of the licensed trade. These proposals are not currently proceeding.

Under the proposed rules, all premises where regulated activities are carried out must be authorised by a premises licence. Where alcohol is sold, the premises must have a designated premises supervisor, who themselves must hold a personal licence. There is a parallel system for the registration of private clubs that sell alcohol to members that requires a club registration certificate.

=== Scotland ===
Scotland has had separate licensing laws dating back to the eighteenth century. The current legislation is the Licensing (Scotland) Act 2005, which replaced the Licensing (Scotland) Act 1976 on 1 September 2009. The replaced licensing laws provided for seven types of liquor licence, and were administered by licensing boards, made up of councillors elected to the local authority. There were approximately 30 licensing boards in Scotland and each had its own distinct approach; for example, while there is a set "permitted hours" across Scotland, these were frequently extended in order to take account of early morning and late night trading, and each licensing board had its own views on what sort of extra hours a premises should be given.

As of 1 February 2008, Scotland entered a "transitional period" in the run-up to the commencement of new licensing legislation—the Licensing (Scotland) Act 2005. The 2005 act is, in many respects, similar to the Licensing Act 2003 for England and Wales: it features the four English licensing objectives, but adds another: "protecting and improving public health". The act creates one class of licence—the Premises Licence—and also introduces Personal Licences for those working in the trade. The administration continues to be carried out by licensing boards, but the act has created new "Licensing Forums" in order to increase community involvement, and "Licensing Standards Officers", who have an information, mediation and compliance role.

The legislation in Scotland regarding the sale of alcohol is different from the rest of the UK and England in particular. The Alcohol etc. (Scotland) Act 2010 has amended the core hours during which shops and supermarkets may sell alcohol. Scotland currently allows the purchase of alcohol between the hours of 10:00am and 10:00pm only. The Alcohol etc. (Scotland) Act 2010 made the application of Challenge 25 mandatory in Scotland, with the requirement being added to the statutory conditions of alcohol licences. The act also introduced a number of other measures aimed at reducing alcohol-related harm, including restrictions on quantity discounts, a ban on irresponsible promotions, and a minimum price per unit of alcohol.

One major change is that Sunday opening hours may be changed to match the rest of the UK, allowing sales from 10:00am, rather than 12:30pm with the 1976 Act.

Licensing law in Scotland was overhauled by the Licensing (Scotland) Act 2005, which came into force in September 2009 following a transition period starting in February 2008. The new system covers alcohol sales only, but otherwise is, in most particulars, identical to the system created in England and Wales by the Licensing Act 2003. There are a number of significant differences, such as a "duty to trade" and attempts to control the irresponsible sale of alcohol through curbs on price discounting and other promotions that may lead to excessive consumption. Another law, starting from 1 May 2018, states that alcohol may not be sold for under 50p per unit.

== Licensing Act 2003 ==
On 10 July 2003, the Licensing Act 2003 for England and Wales was granted royal assent and replaced the previous licensing laws for England and Wales, regulated under several different acts, with a single unified system covering a range of "regulated activities". Rules as to when establishments may open, for how long and under which criteria are now not laid down in statute but are individual to the premises and are contained in the conditions on each Premises Licence. The powers of the 2003 act came fully into force on 24 November 2005. The "licensable activities" as:

- the retail sale of alcohol,
- the supply of alcohol in clubs,
- the provision of late night refreshment, and
- the provision of regulated entertainment.

In turn, "regulated entertainment" is defined as:

- a performance of a play,
- an exhibition of a film,
- an indoor sporting event,
- a boxing or wrestling entertainment (both indoors and outdoors),
- a performance of live music,
- any playing of recorded music,
- a performance of dance, and
- entertainment of a similar description to that falling in the previous three categories listed above.

There are many exemption categories and qualifications to the above definitions, particularly in respect of Regulated Entertainment and Late Night Refreshment. As a result of changes by the Live Music Act 2012, for example, live music in on-licensed premises is no longer a licensable activity between 8:00am and 11:00pm in front of audiences of up to 200 people. Similarly performances of plays and of dance are not licensable in front of audiences of up to 500 people and indoor sporting events up to 1,000 people. These changes, brought in from 2013, alongside the Live Music Act in 2012, display a readiness by the Coalition Government to deregulate the prescriptive and sometimes confusing definitions of Regulated Entertainment stated above (although the Live Music Act was a private members' bill sponsored by Lord Clement-Jones and drafted by Poppleston Allen Solicitors, which was subsequently supported by the government).

"Late night refreshment" is defined as:

- the supply of hot food or drink (that is, food or drink that is either served at, or has been heated on the premises to, a point above ambient temperature) to the public for consumption, both on or off the premises, between 11:00pm and 5:00am.

=== Permitted hours ===
Some long-standing traditions (indeed, legal requirements) have disappeared as a consequence. First, "permitted hours" gained a new meaning. Until the 2003 act came into force on 24 November 2005, permitted hours were a standard legal constraint: for example, serving alcohol after 11:00pm meant that a licensing extension had to exist—either permanent (as for nightclubs, for example) or by special application from the licensee concerned for a particular occasion. There was also a customary general derogation permitting a modest extension on particular dates, such as New Year's Eve and some other public holidays. Licensees did not need to apply for these and could take advantage of them if they wished without any formality. Now, permitted hours are theoretically continuous: it is possible for a Premises Licence that allows 24-hour opening to be held, and indeed some do exist.

Most licensed premises do not go this far, but many applied for licences in 2005 that allowed them longer opening hours than before. However, as in the past, there is no obligation for licensees to use all the time permitted to them. Premises that still close (for commercial reasons) at 11:00pm during most of the week may well have licences permitting them to remain open longer, perhaps for several hours. Staying open after 11:00pm on the spur of the moment is therefore legal at such premises if the licensee decides to do so. The service of alcohol must still cease when the licence closing time arrives. Only the holder of the comparatively rare true "24-hour" licence has complete freedom in this respect.

=== Drinking-up time ===
The consumption of alcohol itself is not considered a "licensable activity" under the new Licensing Act. Therefore, "drinking-up time" (DUT) has no legal meaning and has disappeared. For many years, ten minutes (and later extended to twenty minutes) was the legal dispensation that allowed the consumption of alcohol to continue after the official closing time, which in recent times meant that customers could still drink what they had already bought until 11:20pm, subject to the licensee's discretion. After that time, consumption had to stop, also.

With the end of standard permitted hours, this concession became irrelevant, and there is no mention of DUT in the 2003 act. Instead, applicants for Premises Licences may specify the maximum period (their "Opening Hours") for which they wish to allow their customers to stay after the time at which the sale of alcohol ends ("the terminal hour") within their operating schedule. Some licences do not specify opening hours at all, which allows an unspecified drinking up time, determined only by the licensee's discretion. In contrast, some licensees call for "last orders" twenty minutes (or more) before the end of the opening hours specified on their Premises Licence.

=== Serving after 11:00pm ===
Part of the changes since 2005 allows pubs to serve alcohol past 11:00pm; this particular part of the legislation was, and remains, very controversial owing to the perceived increase in potential for binge drinking and the effects the change will have on social dynamics. However, the new law's defenders have claimed that the relatively early 11:00pm closing time itself contributed to binge drinking as patrons hurried to drink before closing time. The Labour Party also claimed that the fixed closing time contributed to social disorder as all drunken pub patrons were forced into the street at the same time. Both the Conservative Party and Liberal Democrats unsuccessfully called for a delay in the implementation of this law.

=== Licensing policies ===
Each licensing authority must adopt a licensing policy, which gives guidance on when licences will be granted and the conditions and permitted hours likely to be imposed on a Premises Licence in various circumstances.

=== Licensing objectives ===
The licensing authority, in considering any application for a licence or for a variation, must have regard to "the licensing objectives":

England and Wales	Scotland	(Northern Ireland proposals)
1. the prevention of crime and disorder; 2. public safety; 3. the prevention of public nuisance; and 4. the protection of children from harm.	1. preventing crime and disorder; 2. securing public safety; 3. preventing public nuisance; 4. protecting and improving public health; and 5. protecting children from harm.	1. promotion of public health; 2. promotion of public safety; 3. prevention of crime and disorder; 4. prevention of public nuisance; 5. protection of children from harm; and 6. fair treatment of all stakeholders.

=== Licensing authorities ===
The licensing authorities are local councils. In two-tier parts of England and Wales, these are the district or borough councils and elsewhere unitary authorities are the licensing authorities. In Scotland each council has a licensing board to act as licensing authority.

For a premises licence, the licensing authority is the council for the place where the premises is located; where they straddle a boundary, the applicant may choose either one. For a personal licence, it is the licensing authority in whose area the applicant lives.

The licensing authority is also responsible for the issue of a personal licence.

=== Personal Licence ===
The Personal Licence allows an individual to sell alcohol or authorise its sale by others. A Personal Licence applicant must, prior to making an application, pass an exam, known as the Award for Personal Licence Holders (APLH) The APLH exam is a 40-question, multiple-choice paper, in which the applicant must achieve a score of 28 out of 40, or 70 percent. The applicant must also obtain "Basic Disclosure", which details any unspent convictions.

Upon application and if the applicant has no unspent relevant convictions, the licensing authority must grant a Personal Licence, now with no expiry date attached. If relevant convictions are disclosed, the licensing authority must send a copy of the application to the local police, which may object within 14 days. A hearing may then follow.

The applicant must make his or her application to the licensing authority where they ordinarily reside. Any changes to the Personal Licence thereafter (for example, name or address) must be notified to that original licensing authority, even if the Personal Licence Holder ("PLH") has subsequently moved out of the area. Failure to do so is a criminal offence.

A PLH, if charged with a relevant criminal offence, must tell the court at the first appearance that they are a holder of a Personal Licence. Failure to do so is a criminal offence. If the PLH is convicted of the original offence, the court may suspend or forfeit the personal licence. A Personal Licence is valid:

- in England and Wales, indefinitely. The act originally required a holder to renew his or her Personal Licence every 10 years. Owing to the vast number of licences first issued under the new regime in 2005, and the burden it would have on licensing authorities, the government made all Personal Licences run indefinitely by enactment of section 69 of the Deregulation Act 2015;
- in Scotland, also 10 years but after 5 years the licence holder must satisfy the local licensing board that he or she has passed a refresher course;
- in Northern Ireland, also 10 years and under substantially stricter conditions as the licensing authorities in England, Wales, and Scotland. A Personal Licence granted in one jurisdiction is not valid in another.

All businesses and organisations selling or supplying alcohol, except members' clubs and certain community premises, must have a Designated Premises Supervisor (DPS). The DPS, who is listed on a Premises Licence, is expected to be responsible for the day-to-day running of the premises, but this is not required by the act. The DPS is required to hold a Personal Licence where the retail sale of alcohol is a permitted activity on the licence.

=== Local variations ===
Local authorities have decided whether or not to exercise their power to introduce specific local restrictions on outdoor drinking. For example Reading Borough Council is among authorities to have emulated the conditions of Transport for London that ban drinking in certain locations and the carrying of open alcohol in parts of Reading town centre. The open alcohol-container ban and ban on alcohol consumption outright set a lower threshold than being drunk or drunk and disorderly in a public place.

== Concerns ==
Whilst the reforms from 2005 were intended to reduce binge drinking, reports have variously claimed that the situation in England and Wales has not improved or that it has become even worse. This has prompted a Parliamentary investigation. The Department of Culture, Media and Sport concludes that the position presents "a mixed picture".

Perceived problems in England and Wales shaped a slightly different approach in the Licensing (Scotland) Act 2005.

Most licensed premises are now following the Challenge 21 rule, which helps to avoid selling to underage people. When a shop assistant believes that the person may be under 21 he or she will ask the customer to prove that he or she is over 18. Challenge 25 (or older) was made mandatory in Scotland by the Alcohol etc. (Scotland) Act 2010.

== See also ==
- Temperance (Scotland) Act 1913
- Prohibition (Laws in different countries)
- List of public house topics
- Alcohol licensing laws of Ireland
