= Continuance of 9 Geo. 1. c. 22 Act 1725 =

Act of the Parliament of Great Britain

- Act of Parliament
- Parliament of Great Britain
- Long title: An Act for continuing an Act made in the Ninth Year of His Majesty's Reign, intituled, "An Act for the more effectual punishing wicked and evil-disposed Persons going armed in Disguise, and doing Injuries and Violences to the Persons and Properties of His Majesty's Subjects; and for the more speedy bringing the Offenders to Justice."
- Citation: 12 Geo. 1. c. 30
- Territorial extent: Great Britain

Dates
- Royal assent: 24 May 1726
- Commencement: 20 January 1726 (Note: Start of session.)
- Repealed: 15 July 1867
Other legislation
Amends	See § Continued enactments
Repealed by	Statute Law Revision Act 1867
Relates to	Perpetuation of Various Laws Act 1732; Universities (Wine Licences) Act 1743; Continuance of Laws (No.2) Act 1750

Status: Repealed

Text of statute as originally enacted

The Continuance of 9 Geo. 1. c. 22 Act 1725 (12 Geo. 1. c. 30) was an act of the Parliament of Great Britain that continued various older acts.

== Background ==
In the United Kingdom, acts of Parliament remain in force until expressly repealed. Many acts of parliament, however, contained time-limited sunset clauses, requiring legislation to revive enactments that had expired or to continue enactments that would otherwise expire.

== Provisions ==
=== Continued enactments ===
Section 1 of the act continued the Criminal Law Act 1722 (9 Geo. 1. c. 22), until the end of the next session of parliament after 5 years from the expiration of the act.

== Subsequent developments ==
The Criminal Law Act 1722 (9 Geo. 1. c. 22) was continued from the expiration of the act until the end of the next session of parliament after 1 September 1736 by section 5 of the Perpetuation of Various Laws Act 1732 (6 Geo. 2. c. 37).

The Criminal Law Act 1722 (9 Geo. 1. c. 22) was continued from the expiration of the act until the end of the next session of parliament after 24 June 1751 by section 3 of the Universities (Wine Licences) Act 1743 (17 Geo. 2. c. 40).

The Criminal Law Act 1722 (9 Geo. 1. c. 22) was continued from the expiration of the act until the end of the next session of parliament after 1 September 1757 by section 2 of the Continuance of Laws (No.2) Act 1750 (24 Geo. 2. c. 57).

The Select Committee on Temporary Laws, Expired or Expiring, appointed in 1796, inspected and considered all the temporary laws, observed irregularities in the construction of expiring laws continuance acts, making recommendations and emphasising the importance of the Committee for Expired and Expiring Laws.

The whole act was repealed by section 1 of, and the schedule to, the Statute Law Revision Act 1867 (30 & 31 Vict. c. 59), which came into force on 15 July 1867.
