= Alcohol licensing laws of Ireland =

In the law of the Republic of Ireland, the sale of alcoholic beverages requires a licence to be granted by the District Court or Circuit Court. The current laws, commonly called the licensing laws, originate from historical alcohol licensing laws of the United Kingdom, with divergences since the Irish Free State left the United Kingdom in 1922.

The most common licences are:

Ordinary Publican's On Licence
allowing sale of alcohol to the general public for consumption on the premises. The premises to which the licence applies are formally called "licensed premises"; the most common type is the public house (see also Irish pub).
Off licence
allowing sale of alcohol to the general public for consumption off the premises. Such a shop is commonly called an "off licence".

Other types of licences exist which can apply temporarily; vary the usual limits on hours of sale; allow sale only of lower-alcohol beverages; or allow sale only to restricted groups (such as club members, hotel residents, or restaurant diners).

The current primary legislation includes the following collective citations:

- the Licensing Acts 1833 to 2018 (most of those passed since 1922 are named "Intoxicating Liquor Act" rather than "Licensing Act")
- the Courts of Justice Acts 1924 to 2019
- the Registration of Clubs Acts 1904 to 2008 (apart from the Registration of Clubs (Ireland) Act 1904, the relevant acts are included in the previous citations)

In 2022, the general scheme was published for a new Sale of Alcohol Bill. The Oireachtas joint committee on justice submitted a report on its pre-legislative scrutiny of the bill in 2023. As of 8 April 2025 the bill was in the legislative programme of the current government but had not been formally introduced in the Oireachtas.
