= Public Stores Act 1875 =

Act of the Parliament of the United Kingdom

Public Stores Act 1875 (Note: Section 1.)
- Act of Parliament
- Parliament of the United Kingdom
- Long title: An Act to consolidate, with amendments, the Acts relating to the Protection of Public Stores.
- Citation: 38 & 39 Vict. c. 25
- Territorial extent: United Kingdom

Dates
- Royal assent: 29 June 1875
- Commencement: 29 June 1875 (Note: The Acts of Parliament (Commencement) Act 1793.)
Other legislation
Amends	See § Repealed enactments
Repeals/revokes	See § Repealed enactments
Amended by	Statute Law Revision Act 1883; Territorial Army and Militia Act 1921; Consumer Credit Act 1974; Statute Law (Repeals) Act 1976; Statute Law (Repeals) Act 1993

Status: Amended

Text of statute as originally enacted

Revised text of statute as amended

Text of the Public Stores Act 1875 as in force today (including any amendments) within the United Kingdom, from legislation.gov.uk.

The Public Stores Act 1875 (38 & 39 Vict. c. 25) is an act of the Parliament of the United Kingdom which applied to all stores under the care of the secretary of state, including "any public department or office, or of any person in the service of Her Majesty." Although in parts now superseded by subsequent legislation, or otherwise defunct, some sections are still in force. This includes a power of stop and search that is still available to police constables today.

== Provisions ==
The act created various offences relating to the destruction or concealment of such stores (section 5), unlawfully possess or steal such stores (section 7), and also empowered police constables to stop and search any vehicles or vessels they have reasonable grounds to suspect of carrying any aforementioned stores obtained illegally (section 6). This power of stop and search is still exercisable by constables. Other than the Poaching Prevention Act 1862 (25 & 26 Vict. c. 114), it is the oldest search power in UK legislation.

Section 8 of the act also prohibited searching for stores, or sweeping or dredging within 100 yards of any naval base, wharf or warehouse, or moored vessel of the Royal Naval or any such properties belonging to the Royal Artillery.

=== Repealed enactments ===
Section 18 of the act repealed 9 enactments, listed in the second schedule to the act.

Citation	Short title	Description	Extent of repeal
9 Will. 3. c. 41 (Note: This is the citation in The Statutes of the Realm.)	Embezzlement of Public Stores Act 1697	An Act for the better preventing the Imbezlement of His Majesty's Stores of War, and preventing Cheats, Frauds, and Abnses in paying Seamen's Wages.	So much as is unrepealed.
9 Geo. 1. c. 8	Continuance of Laws Act 1722	An Act, the Title whereof begins with the Words An Act for continuing some Laws, and ends with the Words Stuffs to be exported.	So much as is unrepealed.
17 Geo. 2. c. 40	Universities (Wine Licences) Act 1743	An Act, the Title whereof begins with the Words An Act to continue the several Laws, and ends with the Words England without Licence.	Section ten.
39 & 40 Geo. 3. c 89	Embezzlement of Public Stores Act 1800	An Act for the better preventing the Embezzlement of His Majesty's Naval, Ordnance, and Victualling Stores.	The whole act.
54 Geo. 3. c. 60	Embezzlement of Cordage Act 1814	An Act for the better preventing the Embezzlement of His Majesty's Cordage.	The whole act.
54 Geo. 3. c. 159	Harbours Act 1814	An Act, the Title whereof begins with the Words An Act for the better regulation, and ends with the Words several Acts passed for that purpose.	Section ten.
55 Geo. 3. c. 127	Embezzlement of Public Stores Act 1815	An Act to repeal an Act of the Fifty-third Year of His present Majesty, for preventing the Embezzlement of Stores; and to extend the Provisions of the several Acts relating to His Majesty's Naval, Ordnance, and Victualling Stores to all other public Stores.	The whole act.
30 & 31 Vict. c. 128	War Department Stores Act 1867	The War Department Stores Act, 1867	The whole act, except sections one and two, so much of section three as defines "Secretary of State for War" and "stores," and section twenty.
32 & 33 Vict. c. 12	Naval Stores Act 1869	The Naval Stores Act, 1869	The whole act.

== Subsequent developments ==
Section 17 of the act was repealed by section 1(1) of, and part XV of schedule 1 to, the Statute Law (Repeals) Act 1976, which came into force on 27 May 1976.

== See also ==
- Broad arrow

== Bibliography ==
- "Public Stores Act 1875". Halsbury's Statutes of England and Wales. Fourth Edition. Volume 12(1). 2008 Reissue. Page 181 to 186.
- "The Public Stores Act 1875". Halsbury's Statutes of England. Third Edition. Butterworths. London. 1969. Volume 8. Pages 200 to 205.
- "The Public Stores Act, 1875". Halsbury's Statutes of England. (The Complete Statutes of England). First Edition. Butterworth & Co (Publishers) Limited. Bell Yard, Temple Bar, London. 1929. Volume 4: . Page 683 to 687.
- Lely, J M. "Public Stores". The Statutes of Practical Utility. (Chitty's Statutes). Fifth Edition. Sweet and Maxwell. Stevens and Sons. London. 1895. Volume 10. Title "Public Improvements". Pages 80 to 84.
- The Statutes: Third Revised Edition. HMSO. 1950. Volume 9. Page 395 et seq.
- The Statutes Revised: Northern Ireland. Second Edition. HMSO. Volume 2. Page 1033 et seq.
- "Public Stores Act, 1875" (1875) 39 The Justice of the Peace 755 (27 November)
- Jervis, John. "Offences relating to Public Stores". Archbold's Pleading and Evidence in Criminal Cases. Nineteenth Edition, by William Bruce. Henry Sweet. Stevens and Sons. London. 1878. Book II. Part II. Chapter I. Section 10. Pages 849 to 851.
