= Universities (Wine Licences) Act 1743 =

Act of the Parliament of Great Britain

Universities (Wine Licences) Act 1743 (Note: The citation of this act by this short title was authorised by section 1 of, and the first schedule to, the Short Titles Act 1896. Due to the repeal of those provisions it is now authorised by section 19(2) of the Interpretation Act 1978.)
- Act of Parliament
- Parliament of Great Britain
- Long title: An Act to continue the Laws therein mentioned, for preventing Theft and Rapine on the Northern Borders of England; for the more effectual punishing wicked and evil-disposed Persons going armed in Disguise, and doing Injuries and Violences to the Persons and Properties of His Majesty's Subjects, and for the more speedy bringing the Offenders to Justice; for continuing Two Clauses, to prevent the cutting or breaking down the Bank of any River or Sea Bank, and to prevent the malicious cutting of Hop-binds; and for the more effectual Punishment of Persons maliciously setting on Fire any Mine, Pit, or Delph, of Coal or Cannel Coal, and of Persons unlawfully hunting or taking any Red or Fallow Deer in Forests or Chases, or beating or wounding the Keepers or other Officers in Forests, Chases, or Parks; and for granting a Liberty to carry Sugars, of the Growth, Produce, or Manufacture, of any of His Majesty's Sugar Colonies in America, from the said Colonies, directly to Foreign Parts, in Ships built in Great Britain, and navigated according to Law; and to explain Two Acts, relating to the Prosecution of Offenders for embezzling Naval Stores or Stores of War; and to prevent the retailing of Wine within either of the Universities, in that Part of Great Britain called England, without a License.
- Citation: 17 Geo. 2. c. 40
- Territorial extent: Great Britain

Dates
- Royal assent: 12 May 1744
- Commencement: 1 December 1743 (Note: Start of session.)
- Repealed: 24 November 2005 (Note: The Licensing Act 2003 (Commencement No. 7 and Transitional Provisions) Order 2005 (SI 2005/3056).)
Other legislation
Amends	See § Continued enactments
Amended by	Continuance of Laws (No.2) Act 1750; Naval and Victualling Stores Act 1862; Public Stores Act 1875; Justices of the Peace Act 1968
Repealed by	Licensing Act 2003
Relates to	See Expiring laws continuance acts

Status: Repealed

Text of statute as originally enacted

Revised text of statute as amended

The Universities (Wine Licences) Act 1743 (17 Geo. 2. c. 40) was an act of the Parliament of Great Britain that continued various older enactments.

== Background ==
In the United Kingdom, acts of Parliament remain in force until expressly repealed. Many acts of parliament, however, contained time-limited sunset clauses, requiring legislation to revive enactments that had expired or to continue enactments that would otherwise expire.

== Provisions ==
=== Continued enactments ===
Section 1 of the act continued the Criminal Law Act 1722 (9 Geo. 1. c. 22), as continued by the Continuance of 9 Geo. 1. c. 22 Act 1725 (12 Geo. 1. c. 30) and the Perpetuation of Various Laws Act 1732 (6 Geo. 2. c. 37), from the expiration of the act until the end of the next session of parliament after 24 June 1751.

Section 2 of the act continued the clauses in the Perpetuation of Various Laws Act 1732 (6 Geo. 2. c. 37) as relates to the Moss Troopers Act 1662 (14 Cha. 2. c. 22) (Note: This is the chapter in The Statutes of the Realm.) or "for the more effectual prevention of theft and rapine upon the northern borders of England", from the expiration of those enactments until the end of the next session of parliament after 24 June 1751.

Section 3 of the act continued the Criminal Law Act 1722 (9 Geo. 1. c. 22), as continued by the Continuance of 9 Geo. 1. c. 22 Act 1725 (12 Geo. 1. c. 30), the Perpetuation of Various Laws Act 1732 (6 Geo. 2. c. 37) and the Offences Against Persons and Property Act 1736 (10 Geo. 2. c. 32), from the expiration of the act until the end of the next session of parliament after 24 June 1751.

Section 4 of the act continued section 5 of the Perpetuation of Various Laws Act 1732 (6 Geo. 2. c. 37) "that if any person or persons, during the continuance of the said act made in the said ninth year of the reign of his said late majesty King George the First, shall unlawfully and maliciously break or cut down the bank or banks of any river, or any sea banks, whereby any lands shall be overflowed or damaged, every such person being thereof lawfully convicted, shall be adjudged guilty of felony, and shall suffer death, without benefit of clergy", as continued by the Offences Against Persons and Property Act 1736 (10 Geo. 2. c. 32), from the expiration of that enactment until the end of the next session of parliament after 24 June 1751.

Section 5 of the act continued section 6 of the Perpetuation of Various Laws Act 1732 (6 Geo. 2. c. 37) "that if any person or persons, during the continuance of the said act made in the ninth year of the reign of his said late majesty King George the First, shall unlawfully and maliciously cut any hop-binds, growing on poles in any plantation of hops, every such person or persons, being thereof lawfully convicted, shall be guilty of felony, and shall suffer death without benefit of clergy", as continued by the Offences Against Persons and Property Act 1736 (10 Geo. 2. c. 32), from the expiration of that enactment until the end of the next session of parliament after 24 June 1751.

Section 6 of the act continued the clause in the Offences Against Persons and Property Act 1736 (10 Geo. 2. c. 32) "for extending, during the continuance of the said act made in the ninth year of the reign of his said late Majesty, all the provisions in the last mentioned act contained (for the more speedy and easy bringing the offenders against the said act to justice, and the persons who shall conceal, aid, abet, or succour such offenders; and for making satisfaction and amends to all and every the person and persons, their executors and administrators, for the damages they shall have sustained or suffered by any offender or offenders against the said act, and for the encouragement of persons to apprehend and secure such offender and offenders; and for the better and more impartial trial of any indictment or information which shall be found, commenced, or prosecuted for any of the offences committed against the said act, together with all restrictions, limitations, and mitigations by the said act directed) to all cases of offences committed by unlawfully and maliciously breaking down, or cutting down the bank or banks of any river, or any sea bank, whereby any lands shall be overflowed or damaged; or by unlawfully and maliciously cutting any hop binds, growing on poles, in any plantation of hops; or by wilfully and maliciously setting on fire, or causing to be set on fire, any ill mine, pit, or delph of coal, or cannel coal" from the expiration of that enactment until the end of the next session of parliament after 24 June 1751.

Section 7 of the act continued the Offences Against Persons and Property Act 1736 (10 Geo. 2. c. 32) "for the punishment of persons maliciously setting on fire, or causing to be set on fire at any mine, pit, or delph of coal, or cannel coal" from the expiration of that enactment until the end of the next session of parliament after 24 June 1751.

Section 8 of the act continued the Offences Against Persons and Property Act 1736 (10 Geo. 2. c. 32) "relating to the punishment, trial, and conviction of such persons as shall be guilty a felony in going armed, or coursing, hunting, taking in toils, killing, wounding, or taking any red or fallow deer, in any open or uninclosed forest or chace where deer are usually kept; and for the punishment of such persons who shall come into any forest, chace, or park wherein deer are usually kept (be the same inclosed or not inclosed) with an intent to course, hunt, take in toils, kill, wound, or take away any red or fallow deer, and shall there unlawfully beat or wound any keeper or keepers, page or pages of any such forest, chace, or park, where deer are usually kept; then servants or assistants, in the execution of his or their office from the expiration of that enactment until the end of the next session of parliament after 24 June 1751.

Section 9 of the act continued the Colonial Trade Act 1738 (12 Geo. 2. c. 30) from the expiration of the act until the end of the next session of parliament after 24 June 1751.

Section 10 of the act extended the provisions of the Embezzlement of Public Stores Act 1697 (9 Will. 3. c. 41) as continued by the Continuance of Laws Act 1722 (9 Geo. 1. c. 8), providing that judges, justices of assize, or justices of the peace at general quarter-sessions could hear, try and determine by indictment or otherwise all crimes and offences mentioned in the preceding acts, and could impose fines not exceeding £200 on offenders, with alternative punishments including imprisonment, public whipping, house of correction, or hard labour for up to three months if the penalty and forfeiture could not be made or mitigated.

Section 11 of the act provided that from 24 June 1744, no person could sell wine within either of the universities of Oxford or Cambridge or their precincts unless duly licensed or authorized by the respective chancellors, vice-chancellors, or university authorities, with penalties including forfeiture of £5 per pound and other money to His Majesty and informers, and established procedures for prosecution in the courts of the chancellors or vice-chancellors of the said universities.

Section 12 of the act provided that nothing in the act shall be construed to prejudice or confirm any of the liberties, privileges, franchises, jurisdictions, powers and authorities belonging to the mayor, bailiffs and commonalty of the city of Oxford, preserving their existing rights as though the act had never been made.

== Subsequent developments ==
Section 4 of the act "for the more speedy and easy bringing the offenders against the said act to justice, and the persons who shall conceal, aid, abet or succour such offenders; and for making satisfaction and amends to all and every the person and persons, their executors and administrators, for the damages they shall have sustained or suffered by any offender or offenders against the said act; and for the encouragement of persons to apprehend and secure such offender and offenders; and for the better and more impartial trial of any indictment or information which shall be found commenced or prosecuted for any of the offences committed against the said act, together with all restrictions, limitations and infringements by the said act directed, to all cases of offences committed by unlawfully and maliciously breaking down or cutting down the bank or banks of any river, or any sea bank, whereby any lands shall be overflowed or damaged; or by unlawfully and maliciously cutting any hop-binds growing on poles in any plantation of hops; or by wilfully and maliciously setting on fire, or causing to be set on fire, any mines, pit, or delph of coal, or cannel coal" was continued from the expiration of that enactment until the end of the next session of parliament after 1 September 1757 by section 4 of the Continuance of Laws (No.2) Act 1750 (24 Geo. 2. c. 57).

The Select Committee on Temporary Laws, Expired or Expiring, appointed in 1796, inspected and considered all temporary laws, observing irregularities in the construction of expiring laws continuance acts, making recommendations and emphasising the importance of the Committee for Expired and Expiring Laws.

Section 10 of the act was repealed by section 18 of, and the second schedule to, the Public Stores Act 1875 (38 & 39 Vict. c. 25), which came into force on 29 June 1875.

The whole act, so far as unrepealed, except the words "Within the university of Cambridge and the precincts thereof no person shall sell wine by retail unless such person shall be duly licensed so to do by the university" in section 11 of the act, was repealed by section 8(2) of, and part I of schedule 5 to, the Justices of the Peace Act 1968, which came into force on 25 October 1968.

The whole act ceased to have effect by section 201(2) of, and paragraph 1 of schedule 6 to, the Licensing Act 2003, and was repealed by section 199 of, and schedule 7 to, the Licensing Act 2003, which came into force on 24 November 2005.
