= Challenge 21 =

Age verification for UK drinking and retail establishments

Challenge 21 and Challenge 25 are part of a scheme in the United Kingdom, that was introduced by the British Beer and Pub Association (BBPA), with the intention of preventing young people gaining access to age restricted products including cigarettes and alcoholic beverages. Under the scheme, customers attempting to buy age-restricted products are asked to prove their age if in the retailer's opinion they look under 21 or 25, even though the minimum age to buy alcohol and cigarettes in the UK is 18.

== Overview ==
The scheme was launched in 2005 in a JD Wetherspoon outlet in Biddulph. The scheme has since been taken over by the Retail of Alcohol Standards Group (RASG).

According to government figures, the scheme has been successful in reducing the number of under-18s gaining access to alcohol.

In May 2007, it was reported that Asda stores in Scotland were operating a Challenge 25 scheme, whereby anyone who appeared to be below the age of 25, seven years above the age required to buy alcohol in the UK, could be asked to provide a form of ID such as a passport, driving licence or PASS-accredited proof of age card.

As of 2011, the four main supermarket chains (Asda, Tesco, Sainsbury’s and Morrisons), Marks & Spencer, Co-op Food, Bargain Booze and Waitrose all apply the Challenge 25 policy. Some have further rules, such as requiring ID from all members of a group in order to proceed with the sale (leading to adults well over 25 sometimes being refused service when shopping with a younger partner, friend or child). Furthermore, some supermarkets have trialled a policy of asking all alcohol purchasers for ID irrespective of apparent age, which has led to senior citizens as old as 86 being refused service.

In many of the large supermarket chains, including Marks & Spencer, The Co-operative and Waitrose, a shop assistant found selling alcohol to an underage person is liable to severe punishment by their employer, including possible dismissal, in addition to the standard legal penalties. In any of these companies, the 'Think 25' policy is drilled into all employees very stringently.

Many independent off-licences continue to apply Challenge 21; enforcement is less stringent in many of these establishments. Other off-licences such as the food halls of Selfridges and Harvey Nichols, Spirited Wines, and the long established shops around Soho are not currently members of the RASG.

Some Tesco stores have experimented with a Challenge 30 policy (i.e. requesting the I.D. of anyone who could be 11 or fewer years over the legal drinking age) dismissing the criticism that it could have an adverse effect on sales. Likewise, some supermarkets in the United States, such as Publix and Winn-Dixie, operate a "Challenge 40" policy, requesting the I.D. of anyone who looks 18 years or less over the legal drinking age. However, selling alcohol to minors is treated much more severely in the US than in the UK.

In recent years pubs and supermarkets have come under increasing pressure from the government to prevent the sale of alcohol to under 18s. Currently the law comes down much heavier on those selling the alcohol than those illegally buying it. The police regularly send young people who appear underage into pubs to try to purchase alcohol. Pubs, managers and staff members face fines for being caught. Repeat offenders face a risk of losing their licence. Pubs are responding by training their staff to ask people for proof of age if they can't immediately tell if a customer is old enough and as a way of encouraging vigilance are likely to fire staff members who get caught selling alcohol to underage people by the police.

== Scotland ==
The Alcohol etc. (Scotland) Act 2010 introduced a requirement for all licensed premises in Scotland to have an age verification policy, which requires the customer's age to be verified if it appears to the person selling alcohol that the customer is under 25.
