= List of acts of the Parliament of Great Britain from 1743 =

This is a complete list of acts of the Parliament of Great Britain for the year 1743.

For acts passed until 1707, see the list of acts of the Parliament of England and the list of acts of the Parliament of Scotland. See also the list of acts of the Parliament of Ireland.

For acts passed from 1801 onwards, see the list of acts of the Parliament of the United Kingdom. For acts of the devolved parliaments and assemblies in the United Kingdom, see the list of acts of the Scottish Parliament, the list of acts of the Northern Ireland Assembly, and the list of acts and measures of Senedd Cymru; see also the list of acts of the Parliament of Northern Ireland.

The number shown after each act's title is its chapter number. Acts are cited using this number, preceded by the year(s) of the reign during which the relevant parliamentary session was held; thus the Union with Ireland Act 1800 is cited as "39 & 40 Geo. 3. c. 67", meaning the 67th act passed during the session that started in the 39th year of the reign of George III and which finished in the 40th year of that reign. Note that the modern convention is to use Arabic numerals in citations (thus "41 Geo. 3" rather than "41 Geo. III"). Acts of the last session of the Parliament of Great Britain and the first session of the Parliament of the United Kingdom are both cited as "41 Geo. 3".

Acts passed by the Parliament of Great Britain did not have a short title; however, some of these acts have subsequently been given a short title by acts of the Parliament of the United Kingdom (such as the Short Titles Act 1896).

Before the Acts of Parliament (Commencement) Act 1793. came into force on 8 April 1793, acts passed by the Parliament of Great Britain were deemed to have come into effect on the first day of the session in which they were passed. Because of this, the years given in the list below may in fact be the year before a particular act was passed.

== 17 Geo. 2 ==
The third session of the 9th Parliament of Great Britain, which met from 1 December 1743 until 12 May 1744.

This session was also traditionally cited as 17 G. 2.

=== Public acts ===
Short title	Citation	Royal assent
Long title
Land Tax Act 1743 (repealed)	17 Geo. 2. c. 1	22 December 1743
An Act for granting an Aid to His Majesty, by a Land Tax, to be raised in Great Britain, for the Service of the Year One Thousand Seven Hundred and Forty-four. (Repealed by Statute Law Revision Act 1867 (30 & 31 Vict. c. 59))
Taxation Act 1743 (repealed)	17 Geo. 2. c. 2	2 March 1744
An Act for continuing the Duties upon Malt, Mum, Cyder, and Perry, in that Part of Great Britain called England; and for granting to His Majesty certain Duties upon Malt, Mum, Cyder, and Perry, in that Part of Great Britain called Scotland; for the Service of the Year One Thousand Seven Hundred and Forty-four. (Repealed by Statute Law Revision Act 1867 (30 & 31 Vict. c. 59))
Poor Rate Act 1743 (repealed)	17 Geo. 2. c. 3	2 March 1744
An Act to oblige Overseers of the Poor to give public Notice of Rates made for the Relief of the Poor, and to produce the same. (Repealed for England and Wales by Rating and Valuation Act 1925 (15 & 16 Geo. 5. c. 90) and for Scotland by Local Government Act 1948 (11 & 12 Geo. 6. c. 26))
Kent Roads Act 1743 (repealed)	17 Geo. 2. c. 4	2 March 1744
An Act for enlarging the Term and Powers granted by an Act, passed in the Third Year of the Reign of His present Majesty, (Note: Kent Roads Act 1729 (3 Geo. 2. c. 15)) for repairing and widening the Road from that Part of Chatham which lies next to the City of Rochester to Saint Dunstan's Cross, near the City of Canterbury, in the County of Kent. (Repealed by Chatham and Canterbury Road Act 1812 (52 Geo. 3. c. lxxxi))
Justices Commitment Act 1743 or the Vagrancy Act 1744 (repealed)	17 Geo. 2. c. 5	2 March 1744
An Act to amend and make more effectual the Laws relating to Rogues, Vagabonds, and other idle and disorderly Persons, and to Houses of Correction. (Repealed by Statute Law Revision Act 1867 (30 & 31 Vict. c. 59) and Statute Law Revision Act 1948 (11 & 12 Geo. 6. c. 62))
Habeas Corpus Suspension Act 1743 (repealed)	17 Geo. 2. c. 6	2 March 1744
An Act to empower His Majesty to secure and detain such Persons as His Majesty shall suspect are conspiring against His Person and Government. (Repealed by Statute Law Revision Act 1867 (30 & 31 Vict. c. 59))
Affidavits in County of Lancaster Act 1743 (repealed)	17 Geo. 2. c. 7	2 March 1744
An Act for taking and swearing Affidavits, to be made Use of in any of the Courts of the County Palatine of Lancaster. (Repealed by Commissioners for Oaths Act 1889 (52 & 53 Vict. c. 10))
New Malton, Yorkshire (Searching, Sealing, etc., of Butter) Act 1743 (repealed)	17 Geo. 2. c. 8	2 March 1744
An Act to prevent the committing of Abuses in the weighing and packing of Butter, in the Town and Borough of New Malton, in the County of York. (Repealed by Statute Law Revision Act 1948 (11 & 12 Geo. 6. c. 62))
Essex and Hertfordshire Roads Act 1743 (repealed)	17 Geo. 2. c. 9	2 March 1744
An Act for repairing and widening the Road leading from a Place called Harlow Bush Common, in the Parish of Harlow, in the County of Essex, to Stump Cross, in the Parish of Great Chesterford, in the said County. (Repealed by Road from Harlow Bush Common to Stump Cross Act 1829 (10 Geo. 4. c. xxi))
Oxford and Gloucester Roads Act 1743 (repealed)	17 Geo. 2. c. 10	2 March 1744
An Act for enlarging the Term and Powers granted by an Act, passed in the Fourth Year of the Reign of His present Majesty, (Note: Oxford and Gloucester Roads Act 1730 (4 Geo. 2. c. 23)) for repairing the Road leading from Chappel on the Heath, in the County of Oxon, to The Quarry above Bourton on the Hill, in the County of Gloucester. (Repealed by Statute Law (Repeals) Act 2013 (c. 2))
Ministers' Widows Fund (Scotland) Act 1743 (repealed)	17 Geo. 2. c. 11	2 March 1744
An Act for raising and establishing a Fund, for a Provision for the Widows and Children of the Ministers of the Church of Scotland, and of the Heads, Principals, and Masters, of the Universities of St. Andrews, Glasgow, and Edinburgh. (Repealed by Ministers' Widows Fund (Scotland) Act 1779 (19 Geo. 3. c. 20))
Warwick Roads Act 1743 (repealed)	17 Geo. 2. c. 12	2 March 1744
An Act for enlarging the Term and Powers granted by an Act, passed in the Third Year of the Reign of His present Majesty, intituled, "An Act for repairing the Roads leading from a Gate called Shipston Toll Gate, at Bridge Town, in the Parish of Old Stratford, in the County of Warwick, through Alderminster and Shipston upon Stower, to the Top of Long Compton Hill, in the said County;" (Note: Warwick Roads Act 1729 (3 Geo. 2. c. 9)) and to make the same more effectual. (Repealed by Old Stratford (Warwickshire) and Long Compton Hill Road Act 1818 (58 Geo. 3. c. xxxiv))
Worcester Roads Act 1743 (repealed)	17 Geo. 2. c. 13	2 March 1744
An Act for continuing the Term and Powers granted by an Act, passed in the First Year of His present Majesty's Reign, intituled, "An Act for repairing and amending several Roads leading to and from the Borough of Evesham, in the County of Worcester;" (Note: Evesham Roads Act 1727 (1 Geo. 2. St. 2. c. 11)) and for making the same more effectual. (Repealed by Evesham Roads Act 1822 (3 Geo. 4. c. lxix))
Middlesex and Hertford Roads Act 1743 (repealed)	17 Geo. 2. c. 14	2 March 1744
An Act for continuing and enlarging the Term and Powers granted by an Act, passed in the Third Year of the Reign of His present Majesty, (Note: Middlesex and Hertford Roads Act 1729 (3 Geo. 2. c. 10)) for repairing the Road leading from Galley Corner, adjoining to Enfield Chace, in the Parish of South Mims, in the County of Middlesex, to Lemsford Mill, in the County of Hertford. (Repealed by Enfield Chase Road Act 1831 (1 Will. 4. c. lx))
Recruiting Act 1743 (repealed)	17 Geo. 2. c. 15	22 March 1744
An Act for the speedy and effectual recruiting of His Majesty's Land Forces and Marines, for the Year One Thousand Seven Hundred and Forty-four. (Repealed by Statute Law Revision Act 1867 (30 & 31 Vict. c. 59))
Mutiny Act 1743 (repealed)	17 Geo. 2. c. 16	22 March 1744
An Act for punishing Mutiny and Desertion; and for the better Payment of the Army and their Quarters. (Repealed by Statute Law Revision Act 1867 (30 & 31 Vict. c. 59))
Supply, etc. Act 1743 (repealed)	17 Geo. 2. c. 17	22 March 1744
An Act for granting to His Majesty the Surplus or Remainder of the Monies arisen, or to arise, by the Duties on Spirituous Liquors, granted by an Act of the last Session of Parliament; (Note: Spirits Act 1742 (16 Geo. 2. c. 8)) and for explaining and amending the said Act, in relation to the Retailers of such Liquors; and for establishing an Agreement with the United Company of Merchants of England trading to The East Indies. (Repealed by Statute Law Revision Act 1867 (30 & 31 Vict. c. 59))
National Debt Act 1743 (repealed)	17 Geo. 2. c. 18	22 March 1744
An Act for raising, by Annuities and a Lottery, in Manner therein mentioned, the Sum of One Million Eight Hundred Thousand Pounds, at Three Pounds per Centum per Annum, for the Service of the Year One Thousand Seven Hundred and Forty-four. (Repealed by Statute Law Revision Act 1870 (33 & 34 Vict. c. 69))
Maidenhead Road Act 1743 (repealed)	17 Geo. 2. c. 19	22 March 1744
An Act for continuing and enlarging the Term and Powers granted by an Act of Parliament passed in the Thirteenth Year of the Reign of His late Majesty King George the First, (Note: Cranford to Maidenhead Road Act 1726 (13 Geo. 1. c. 31)) for repairing the Road from Cranford Bridge, in the County of Middlesex, to that End of Maidenhead Bridge which lies in the County of Bucks. (Repealed by Cranford Bridge and Maidenhead Bridge Road Act 1826 (7 Geo. 4. c. cxxxii))
Derby Roads Act 1743 (repealed)	17 Geo. 2. c. 20	22 March 1744
An Act for continuing and making more effectual an Act made in the Eleventh Year of His present Majesty's Reign, (Note: Derby Roads Act 1737 (11 Geo. 2. c. 33)) for repairing several Roads, leading to and from the Town of Derby, in the County of Derby. (Repealed by Road from Cavendish Bridge to Hulland Ward (Derbyshire) Act 1827 (7 & 8 Geo. 4. c. l))
Borrowstouness Beer Duties Act 1743 (repealed)	17 Geo. 2. c. 21	22 March 1744
An Act for laying a Duty of Two Pennies Scots, or a Sixth Part of a Penny Sterling, upon every Scots Pint of Ale and Beer which shall be brewed for Sale, brought into, tapped, or sold, within the Town of Burrowstouness and Liberties thereof, in the County of Linlithgow, for repairing the Harbour of the said Town. (Repealed by Borrowstouness Town and Harbour Act 1843 (6 & 7 Vict. c. lxix))
Middleton and Bowes Road Act 1743 (repealed)	17 Geo. 2. c. 22	22 March 1744
An Act for repairing the Road leading from the End of Middleton Tyas Lane, over Gatherly Moor, to Greetabridge, and from thence to Bowes, in the North Riding of the County of York. (Repealed by Middleton and Bowes Road Act 1814 (54 Geo. 3. c. xxxi) and Annual Turnpike Acts Continuance Act 1875 (38 & 39 Vict. c. cxciv))
Wiltshire Roads Act 1743 (repealed)	17 Geo. 2. c. 23	22 March 1744
An Act for more effectually repairing the Road from Cherill (through Calne) to Studley Bridge, and from Cherill to The Three Mile Borough, at the Top of Cherill Hill, in the County of Wilts. (Repealed by Road to Studley Bridge Act 1813 (53 Geo. 3. c. cxxviii) and Annual Turnpike Acts Continuance Act 1871 (34 & 35 Vict. c. 115))
Litchfield Roads Act 1743 (repealed)	17 Geo. 2. c. 24	22 March 1744
An Act for more effectually repairing the Roads from Coleshill, (Note: Coleshill, Warwickshire.) in the County of Warwick, through the City of Litchfield, (Note: Lichfield, Staffordshire.) to Stone, (Note: Stone, Staffordshire.) in the County of Stafford, and from thence to the City of Chester; (Note: Chester, Cheshire.) and for amending other Roads therein mentioned. (Repealed by Stafford and Warwick Roads Act 1789 (29 Geo. 3. c. 83))
Kingston-upon-Hull and Beverley Road Act 1743 (repealed)	17 Geo. 2. c. 25	22 March 1744
An Act for repairing the Road between the Town of Kingston upon Hull, and the Town of Beverley, in the East Riding of the County of York. (Repealed by Kingston-upon-Hull and Beverley, and Newland Bridge and Cottingham Roads (Yorkshire, East Riding) Act 1833 (3 & 4 Will. 4. c. xciii))
Recruiting (No. 2) Act 1743 (repealed)	17 Geo. 2. c. 26	3 April 1744
An Act to rectify a Mistake in an Act made this Session of Parliament, intituled, "An Act for the speedy and effectual recruiting His Majesty's Land Forces and Marines, for the Year One Thousand Seven Hundred and Forty-four." (Note: Recruiting Act 1743 (17 Geo. 2. c. 15)) (Repealed by Statute Law Revision Act 1867 (30 & 31 Vict. c. 59))
Wiltshire Roads (No. 2) Act 1743 (repealed)	17 Geo. 2. c. 27	12 May 1744
An Act for continuing an Act passed in the Thirteenth Year of the Reign of His late Majesty King George the First, (Note: Chippenham Roads Act 1726 (13 Geo. 1. c. 13)) so far as the same relates to the repairing the Road from Studley Bridge to Chippenham, in the County of Wilts, and for amending the Road from Chippenham to Pickwick, in the said County. (Repealed by Roads from Studley Bridge and from Chippenham Act 1818 (58 Geo. 3. c. xliii))
River Dee Navigation Act 1743	17 Geo. 2. c. 28	12 May 1744
An Act for explaining and amending an Act passed in the Sixth Year of His present Majesty's Reign, intituled, "An Act to recover and preserve the Navigation of the River Dee, in the County Palatine of Chester;" (Note: River Dee Navigation Act 1732 (6 Geo. 2. c. 30)) and another Act, passed in the Fourteenth Year of His present Majesty's Reign, intituled, "An Act for incorporating the Undertakers of the Navigation of the River Dee;" (Note: River Dee Navigation Act 1740 (14 Geo. 2. c. 8)) and for repealing the Tonnage Rates payable to the said Undertakers, and for granting to them other Tonnage or Keelage Rates in Lieu thereof; and for other Purposes therein mentioned.
London Street Lighting Act 1743 (repealed)	17 Geo. 2. c. 29	12 May 1744
An Act for making more effectual Provision for enlightening the Streets of the City of London. (Repealed by Paving, etc., of London Act 1768 (8 Geo. 3. c. 21))
Linen (Trade Marks) Act 1743 (repealed)	17 Geo. 2. c. 30	12 May 1744
An Act for the more effectual preventing of the affixing of counterfeit Stamps to Foreign or other Linens. (Repealed by Statute Law Revision Act 1959 (7 & 8 Eliz. 2. c. 68))
Duties, etc. Act 1743 (repealed)	17 Geo. 2. c. 31	12 May 1744
An Act for repealing the Duties payable upon Glass Beads, and for granting other Duties in Lieu thereof; and for allowing the same Drawbacks on the Exportation of refined Borax and Camphire which are allowed on the Exportation of unresined Borax and Camphire; and for preventing the fraudulent Exportation of British and Irish Linens, for the Sake of the Bounty allowed by an Act made in the Fifteenth and Sixteenth Year of His present Majesty's Reign; (Note: Duties on Foreign Cambrics, etc. Act 1741 (15 Geo. 2. c. 29)) and for explaining and amending the said Act, as to the Persons who are to receive the said Bounty. (Repealed by Statute Law Revision Act 1867 (30 & 31 Vict. c. 59))
Westminster Bridge Act 1743 (repealed)	17 Geo. 2. c. 32	12 May 1744
An Act to explain and make more effectual several Acts of Parliament, passed in the Reign of His present Majesty, for building a Bridge cross the River Thames, from the City of Westminster, to the opposite Shore in the County of Surrey; and for the better enabling the Commissioners for building the said Bridge to finish the same, and to perform the other Trusts reposed in them; as also for granting further Time for exchanging the Tickets unclaimed in the last Lottery for the said Bridge, and to make Provision for Tickets in the said Lottery, lost, burnt, or otherwise destroyed. (Repealed by Westminster Bridge Act 1853 (16 & 17 Vict. c. 46))
Supply, etc. (No. 2) Act 1743 (repealed)	17 Geo. 2. c. 33	12 May 1744
An Act for granting to His Majesty the Sum of One Million, out of the Sinking Fund; and for applying a Sum remaining in the Exchequer, arisen by the Coinage Duty, for the Service of the Year One Thousand Seven Hundred and Forty-four; and for the further appropriating the Supplies granted in this Session of Parliament; and for making forth Duplicates of Exchequer Bills, Lottery Tickets, Certificates, Annuity Orders, and other Orders, lost, burnt, or otherwise destroyed; and for giving further Time for the Payment of Duties omitted to be paid for the Indentures or Contracts of Clerks and Apprentices; and to enable the Reversioners of certain Annuities therein mentioned to receive such Annuties, if the same shall not be demanded within a certain Time by the Annuitants for Life, until Proof be made that such Annuitants are living. (Repealed by Statute Law Revision Act 1867 (30 & 31 Vict. c. 59))
Naval Prize Act 1743 (repealed)	17 Geo. 2. c. 34	12 May 1744
An Act for the better Encouragement of Seamen, in His Majesty's Service, and Privateers, to annoy the Enemy. (Repealed by Naval Prize Acts Repeal Act 1864 (27 & 28 Vict. c. 23))
Coals Act 1743 (repealed)	17 Geo. 2. c. 35	12 May 1744
An Act to explain, amend, and enlarge, an Act made in the Sixteenth and Seventeenth Year of the Reign of King Charles the Second, intituled, "An Act for regulating the Measures and Prices of Coals." (Note: Coal Trade, London Act 1664 (16 & 17 Cha. 2. c. 2)) (Repealed by Statute Law Revision Act 1867 (30 & 31 Vict. c. 59))
Importation Act 1743 (repealed)	17 Geo. 2. c. 36	12 May 1744
An Act for permitting certain Goods, therein enumerated, to be imported, during the War, in British-built Shipping, the Property of Foreigners; and for Relief of William Ord and others; and for obviating a Doubt which hath arisen, upon the Act of the Twelfth Year of the Reign of King Charles the Second, intituled, "An Act for the encouraging and increasing of Shipping and Navigation," (Note: Navigation Act 1660 (12 Cha. 2. c. 18)) as to the Importation, on the account of Aliens, of Goods of the Growth or Production of the Plantations of Spain and Portugal in English Ships duly navigated. (Repealed by Statute Law Revision Act 1867 (30 & 31 Vict. c. 59))
Land Drainage (Rating) Act 1743 (repealed)	17 Geo. 2. c. 37	12 May 1744
An Act to prevent Disputes touching the Parishes or Places where improved Wastes, and drained and improved Marsh Lands, shall be charged to Parochial Rates. (Repealed by Local Government Act 1966 (c. 42))
Poor Relief Act 1743 (repealed)	17 Geo. 2. c. 38	12 May 1744
An Act for remedying some Defects in the Act made in the Forty-third Year of the Reign of Queen Elizabeth, intituled, "An Act for the Relief of the Poor." (Note: Poor Relief Act 1601 (43 Eliz. 1. c. 2)) (Repealed by General Rate Act 1967 (c. 9))
Treason Act 1743 (repealed)	17 Geo. 2. c. 39	12 May 1744
An Act to make it High Treason to hold Correspondence with the Sons of the Pretender to His Majesty's Crown; and for attainting them of High Treason, in case they shall land, or attempt to land, in Great Britain, or any of the Dominions thereunto belonging; and for suspending the Operation and Effect of a Clause in the Act of the Seventh Year of the late Queen Anne, (Note: Treason Act 1708 (7 Ann. c. 21)) for improving the Union of the Two Kingdoms, relating to Forfeitures for High Treason, until after the Decease of the Sons of the said Pretender. (Repealed by Statute Law Revision Act 1867 (30 & 31 Vict. c. 59))
Universities (Wine Licences) Act 1743 (repealed)	17 Geo. 2. c. 40	12 May 1744
An Act to continue the Laws therein mentioned, for preventing Theft and Rapine on the Northern Borders of England; for the more effectual punishing wicked and evil-disposed Persons going armed in Disguise, and doing Injuries and Violences to the Persons and Properties of His Majesty's Subjects, and for the more speedy bringing the Offenders to Justice; for continuing Two Clauses, to prevent the cutting or breaking down the Bank of any River or Sea Bank, and to prevent the malicious cutting of Hop-binds; and for the more effectual Punishment of Persons maliciously setting on Fire any Mine, Pit, or Delph, of Coal or Cannel Coal, and of Persons unlawfully hunting or taking any Red or Fallow Deer in Forests or Chases, or beating or wounding the Keepers or other Officers in Forests, Chases, or Parks; and for granting a Liberty to carry Sugars, of the Growth, Produce, or Manufacture, of any of His Majesty's Sugar Colonies in America, from the said Colonies, directly to Foreign Parts, in Ships built in Great Britain, and navigated according to Law; and to explain Two Acts, relating to the Prosecution of Offenders for embezzling Naval Stores or Stores of War; and to prevent the retailing of Wine within either of the Universities, in that Part of Great Britain called England, without a License. (Repealed by Statute Law Revision Act 1867 (30 & 31 Vict. c. 59), Public Stores Act 1875 (38 & 39 Vict. c. 25), Statute Law Revision Act 1887 (50 & 51 Vict. c. 59), Oxford and St. Albans Wine Privileges (Abolition) Act 1922 (12 & 13 Geo. 5. c. xxxvi), Statute Law Revision Act 1948 (11 & 12 Geo. 6. c. 62), Justices of the Peace Act 1968 (1968 c. 69) and Licensing Act 2003 (c. 17))
Shoreditch Road Act 1743 (repealed)	17 Geo. 2. c. 41	12 May 1744
An Act for making more effectual several Acts passed for repairing the Road leading from The Stones End, in the Parish of St. Leonard, Shoreditch, in the County of Middlesex, to the furthermost Part of the Northern Road in the Parish of Enfield, in the same County, next to the Parish of Cheshunt, in the County of Hertford; and for amending the Road from the Watch-house in Edmonton to the Market-Place in Enfield. (Repealed by Middlesex Roads Act 1789 (29 Geo. 3. c. 96))
Bedford and Hertford Roads Act 1743 (repealed)	17 Geo. 2. c. 42	12 May 1744
An Act for amending and making more effectual an Act passed in the last Session of Parliament, (Note: Luton and Saint Albans Road Act 1742 (16 Geo. 2. c. 23)) for continuing an Act made in the Thirteenth Year of the Reign of His late Majesty King George the First, (Note: Luton and Saint Albans Road Act 1726 (13 Geo. 1. c. 17)) for repairing the Roads from Luton, in the County of Bedford, to Westwood Gate, in the said County, and from Luton to St. Albans, in the County of Hertford. (Repealed by Maulden Wood Corner and Westwood Gate Road (Bedfordshire) Act 1838 (1 & 2 Vict. c. xlix) and Luton District Road Act 1856 (19 & 20 Vict. c. cviii))
Buckingham to Warmington Road Act 1743 (repealed)	17 Geo. 2. c. 43	12 May 1744
An Act for repairing the Road from the Town of Buckingham, in the County of Bucks, to Warmington, in the County of Warwick. (Repealed by Buckingham to Hanwell Road Act 1811 (51 Geo. 3. c. ii))

=== Private acts ===
Short title	Citation	Royal assent
Long title
Naturalization of Andrew Lindegren and Abraham Spalding, merchants.	17 Geo. 2. c. 1 Pr.	22 December 1743
An Act for naturalizing Andrew Lindegren and Abraham Spalding, of London, Merchants.
Duke of Beaufort's Divorce Act 1743	17 Geo. 2. c. 2 Pr.	2 March 1744
An Act to dissolve the Marriage of Henry Duke of Beaufort with Frances Scudamore his now Wife; and to enable him to marry again; and for other Purposes therein mentioned.
Enabling His Majesty to grant the inheritance of part of Shotover and Stowood forest (Oxfordshire) to trustees for Augustus Schutz and his heirs, upon payment of full consideration.	17 Geo. 2. c. 3 Pr.	2 March 1744
An Act to enable His Majesty to grant the Inheritance of Part of the Forest of Shotover and Stowood, in the County of Oxford, to Trustees, in Trust for Augustus Schutz Esquire and his Heirs, upon a full and valuable Consideration to be paid for the same.
John Carre's Estate Act 1743	17 Geo. 2. c. 4 Pr.	2 March 1744
An Act to enable John Carre of Cavers, Advocate, to sell Lands, in the County of Roxburgh, for Payment of Debts charged thereon; and with the Surplus Money (if any) to purchase other Lands, to be settled to the same Uses as the Lands to be sold are settled.
Westonbirt Inclosure Act 1743	17 Geo. 2. c. 5 Pr.	2 March 1744
An Act for dividing and enclosing the Common Fields, called the North Field and South Field, in the Parish of Westonbirt, in the County of Gloucester.
Enabling Edward Clarke and James Stewart Clarke to take the surname Stewart, pursuant to the will of James Stewart.	17 Geo. 2. c. 6 Pr.	2 March 1744
An Act to enable Edward Stewart, lately called Edward Clarke, and James Stewart Stewart, lately called James Stewart Clarke, to take and use the Surname of Stewart, pursuant to the Will of James Stewart, deceased.
Enabling Randle Hopley of Overton (Cheshire) and his issue to take the surname Dod, pursuant to the will of William Dod.	17 Geo. 2. c. 7 Pr.	2 March 1744
An Act to enable Randle Hopley of Overton, in the County of Chester, Gentleman, and his Issue, to take and use the Surname of Dod, pursuant to the Will of William Dod Esquire, deceased.
Enabling John Caswall to take the Christian and surname of Giles Whitehall, and his sons and their heirs male to take the surname Whitehall, pursuant to the will of Giles Whitehall.	17 Geo. 2. c. 8 Pr.	2 March 1744
An Act to enable John Caswall Gentleman, now called Giles Whitehall, to take and use the Christian and Surname of Giles Whitehall; and also to enable his First and other Sons, and their Heirs Male, to take and use the Surname of Whitehall, in Pursuance of the Will of Giles Whitehall, deceased.
Countess of Holdernesse's Naturalization Act 1743	17 Geo. 2. c. 9 Pr.	2 March 1744
An Act for naturalizing Mary Countess of Holdernesse, Wife of Robert Earl of Holdernesse.
Naturalization of Andrew Templeman, John Darlon, Christian Moller, John Fries and Peter de la Rive, of London, merchants.	17 Geo. 2. c. 10 Pr.	2 March 1744
An Act for naturalizing Andrew Templeman, John Darlon, Christian Moller, John Friderick Fries, and Peter de la Rive, of London, Merchants.
Ritter's Naturalization Act 1743	17 Geo. 2. c. 11 Pr.	2 March 1744
An Act to naturalize Lorentz Bastian Ritter.
Thunn's Naturalization Act 1743	17 Geo. 2. c. 12 Pr.	2 March 1744
An Act for naturalizing John Rudolff Thunn, of London, Merchant.
Lord Abergavenny's Estate Act 1743	17 Geo. 2. c. 13 Pr.	22 March 1744
An Act for settling a Capital Messuage, Lands, and Hereditaments, in East Grinstead, in the County of Sussex, to divers Uses therein mentioned, for the Benefit of William Lord Abergavenny and his Family, as an Equivalent for a Sum of Money appointed by a former Act (Note: Lord Abergavenny's Estate Act 1732 (6 Geo. 2. c. 10 Pr.)) to be laid out in the Purchase of Lands for that Purpose.
Shipton Inclosure Act 1743	17 Geo. 2. c. 14 Pr.	22 March 1744
An Act for dividing and enclosing certain Common Fields, in the Hamlet of Shipton, in the Parish of Winslow, in the County of Bucks.
Bassledon Heath Inclosure Act 1743	17 Geo. 2. c. 15 Pr.	22 March 1744
An Act for enclosing the Common and Waste Ground called Bassledon Heath, in the County of Berks.
Flecknoe in Wolfhampcoat (Warwickshire) Inclosure Act 1743	17 Geo. 2. c. 16 Pr.	22 March 1744
An Act for enclosing and dividing the Common Fields called Flecknoe, in the Parish of Wolfhampcoat, in the County of Warwick.
Confirming an exchange agreement of certain rights of common in East Langton, West Langton, Church Langton and Thorpe Langton (Leicestershire) and payment of a yearly sum to rector in lieu of tithes.	17 Geo. 2. c. 17 Pr.	22 March 1744
An Act for confirming an Agreement made to exchange certain Rights of Common, in the Parish, Townships, or Hamlets, of East Langton, West Langton, Church Langton, and Thorpe Langton, in the County of Leicester, and for settling an Yearly Sum to be paid to the Rector of the said Parish, and his Successors, in Lieu of Tithes.
Mareham le Fenn Inclosure Act 1743	17 Geo. 2. c. 18 Pr.	22 March 1744
An Act for enclosing and dividing the Common called The Severals, and the Moor, lying in the Manor and Parish of Mareham Le Fenn, in the County of Lincoln.
Bagnall's Estate Act 1743	17 Geo. 2. c. 19 Pr.	22 March 1744
An Act for Sale of the Capital Messuage at Roughampton, and divers Lands and Hereditaments, in the County of Surrey, late the Estate of Joseph Bagnall Esquire, deceased; and for purchasing another Estate, to be settled to the Uses of his Will.
Bowater's Estate Act 1743	17 Geo. 2. c. 20 Pr.	22 March 1744
An Act for the Sale of certain Houses and Ground in Woolwich, Part of the settled Estate of Edward Bowater Esquire, pursuant to an Agreement with the Commissioners of the Navy; and for applying the Money arising by such Sale in the Purchase of another Estate, to be settled to the Uses of his Marriage Settlement.
Powys' Estate Act 1743	17 Geo. 2. c. 21 Pr.	22 March 1744
An Act for vesting Part of the settled Estate of Edward Powys Esquire and Katherine his Wife in Trustees, for raising Money, to pay Debts; and for securing an Equivalent for the same, for the Benefit of his said Wife, and their Issue; and of Thomas Powys Esquire, and his Heirs and Assigns.
Confirming to Henry Hervey, his wife and their issue male the surname and arms of Aston, pursuant to a settlement made by Sir Thomas Aston, deceased.	17 Geo. 2. c. 22 Pr.	22 March 1744
An Act for confirming to the Honourable Henry Hervey Clerk, his Wife, and their Issue Male, the Surname and Arms of Aston, pursuant to a Settlement made by Sir Thomas Aston Baronet, deceased.
Earl of Dalkeith's Estate Act 1743	17 Geo. 2. c. 23 Pr.	12 May 1744
An Act for confirming the Jointure made on the Marriage of Francis Scott Esquire, commonly called Earl of Dalkeith, Eldest Son and Heir Apparent to Francis Duke of Buccleuch, with Lady Caroline Campbell; and for empowering the Heirs of Entail succeeding to the Estate of Francis late Earl of Buccleuch to make Jointures, in such Manner as is therein mentioned.
Earl of Plymouth's Estate Act 1743	17 Geo. 2. c. 24 Pr.	12 May 1744
An Act to empower the Guardians of Other Lewis Earl of Plimouth, an Infant, to purchase the Estate of his Grandfather Thomas Lewis Esquire, in the County of Glamorgan.
Thomas Baron of Caher's estate in Ireland: sale of part for payment of debts and incumbrances.	17 Geo. 2. c. 25 Pr.	12 May 1744
An Act for Sale of Part of the Estate of Thomas Lord Baron of Caher in the Kingdom of Ireland, towards discharging the Debts and Encumbrances affecting the same.
Sutton's Estate Act 1743	17 Geo. 2. c. 26 Pr.	12 May 1744
An Act for vesting the settled Estate of Sir Robert Sutton, in the County of Nottingham, in Trustees, to be sold, for discharging several Mortgages and Encumbrances; and for laying out the Surplus of the Money arising by such Sale in the Purchase of other Lands, to be settled, together with his Estate in the County of Lincoln, to the Uses therein mentioned.
Extending time limited by Sir Francis Leicester's will for sale of real estate of Sir John Byrne in Ireland and enabling Sir Peter Byrne to use the surname Leicester.	17 Geo. 2. c. 27 Pr.	12 May 1744
An Act to enlarge the Time limited by the Will of Sir Francis Leicester Baronet, deceased, for Sale of the Real Estate late of Sir John Byrne Baronet, deceased, in the Kingdom of Ireland; and also enable Sir Peter Byrne Baronet and his Issue to take and use the Surname of Leicester only, pursuant to the said Will.
Empowering John Thornhagh to make a jointure and provision for younger children from a voluntary settlement made by his father Saint Andrew Thornhagh (deceased).	17 Geo. 2. c. 28 Pr.	12 May 1744
An Act for empowering John Thornhagh Esquire to make a Jointure and Provision for his Younger Children, out of an Estate comprized in a voluntary Settlement made by St. Andrew Thornhagh Esquire, his late Father, deceased.
Cliffe's Estate Estate Act 1743	17 Geo. 2. c. 29 Pr.	12 May 1744
An Act for vesting divers Lands and Hereditaments, devised by the Will of Richard Cliffe Esquire, deceased, in Trustees, to be sold, for paying the Debts and Legacies charged thereupon by the said Will; and for laying out the Surplus of the Money arising by such Sale (if any) in purchasing other Lands, to be settled to the Uses of the said Will.
Ayshcombe's Estate Act 1743	17 Geo. 2. c. 30 Pr.	12 May 1744
An Act for Sale of Part of the settled Estate of John Ayshcombe Gentleman, lying in the County of Warwick; and for settling another Estate, in the same County, of greater Value, to the same Uses, in Lieu thereof; and for other Purposes therein mentioned.
George Downes' Estate Act 1743	17 Geo. 2. c. 31 Pr.	12 May 1744
An Act for vesting the Estate late of George Downes Esquire, deceased, in the County of Wilts, in Edward Gale Gentleman and his Heirs, in Trust, to convey the same to Robert Neale Esquire, and his Heirs (pursuant to Articles of Agreement made for Sale thereof) towards Payment of the Encumbrances charged thereupon; and for other Purposes therein mentioned.
Cullum's Estate Act 1743	17 Geo. 2. c. 32 Pr.	12 May 1744
An Act for vesting Part of the settled Estate of John Cullum Esquire in Trustees, to be sold, towards discharging Encumbrances affecting the same; and for securing and providing an Equivalent for the same, out of another Part of his Estate, for the Uses and Purposes of his Marriage Settlement.
Enabling William Moore to sell an estate purchased under William Smythe's will and to purchase another for the uses of the will.	17 Geo. 2. c. 33 Pr.	12 May 1744
An Act to enable William Moore Esquire to sell an Estate purchased under the Will of William Smythe Esquire; and to lay out the Money thereby arising, with other Money therein mentioned, in the Purchase of another Estate, to be settled to the Uses of the said Will.
Fownes' Estate Act 1743	17 Geo. 2. c. 34 Pr.	12 May 1744
An Act for vesting the settled Estate of Thomas Fownes Esquire in Trustees, to be sold, together with his Fee-Simple Estate, for the Payment of the Debts of his Father and himself; and for laying out the Surplus Money in the Purchase of another Estate, to be settled to the Uses of his Marriage Settlement.
Hawker's Estate Act 1743	17 Geo. 2. c. 35 Pr.	12 May 1744
An Act for vesting the settled Estate of Peter Hawker Esquire, in the County of Dorset, in Trustees, to be sold; and for providing and securing an Equivalent for the same, to be settled to the same Uses.
North Stoneham Common Inclosure Act 1743	17 Geo. 2. c. 36 Pr.	12 May 1744
An Act for confirming Agreements made for enclosing and dividing Part of North Stoneham Common, in the County of Southampton.
Ripon, &c. Inclosure Act 1743	17 Geo. 2. c. 37 Pr.	12 May 1744
An Act for extinguishing a Right of Common claimed by, and belonging to, the Owners and Proprietors of ancient Burgages and Tenements, in Ripon, Littlethorpe, and Bondgate, in the County of York; and for settling and providing an Equivalent for the said Common Right.
Boetefeur's Naturalization Act 1743	17 Geo. 2. c. 38 Pr.	12 May 1744
An Act for naturalizing Bernard Joachim Boeteseur.
Naville's Naturalization Act 1743	17 Geo. 2. c. 39 Pr.	12 May 1744
An Act for naturalizing Stephen Naville.

=== Sources ===
- Pickering, Danby, ed. (1765). The Statutes at Large. Vol. 18: From the 15th to the 20th Year of King George II. Cambridge: Joseph Bentham – via Internet Archive.
- Pickering, Danby, ed. (1765). The Statutes at Large. Vol. 18: From the 15th to the 20th Year of King George II. Cambridge: Joseph Bentham – via Google Books.
- Journals of the House of Commons. Vol. 24. London: His Majesty's Stationery Office. 1803. pp. 482–688 – via Google Books.
- Chronological Table of and Index to the Statutes. Vol. 1: To the End of the Session 59 Vict. Sess. 2 (1895) (13th ed.). London: Her Majesty's Stationery Office. 1896. p. 108 – via Google Books.
- "Acts of the Parliament of Great Britain from 1743". legislation.gov.uk. The National Archives.

== See also ==
- List of acts of the Parliament of Great Britain
