= Black Act 1723 =

Act of the Parliament of Great Britain

Criminal Law Act 1722
- Act of Parliament
- Parliament of Great Britain
- Long title: An Act for the more effectual punishing wicked and evil disposed Persons going armed in Disguise and doing Injuries and Violence to the Persons and Properties of His Majesty's Subjects, and for the more speedy bringing the Offenders to Justice.
- Citation: 9 Geo. 1. c. 22
- Territorial extent: Great Britain

Dates
- Royal assent: 27 May 1723
- Commencement: 1 June 1723 (Note: Section 1.)
- Repealed: 1 July 1827
Other legislation
Amended by	Continuance of 9 Geo. 1. c. 22 Act 1725; Perpetuation of Various Laws Act 1732; Offences Against Persons and Property Act 1736; Universities (Wine Licences) Act 1743; Continuance of Laws (No.2) Act 1750; Continuance, etc., of Acts, 1757
Repealed by	Criminal Statutes Repeal Act 1827, s 1
Relates to	Building Act 1774

Status: Repealed

Text of statute as originally enacted

The act 9 Geo. 1. c. 22, commonly known as the Black Act, or the Waltham Black Act, and sometimes called the Black Act 1722, the Black Act 1723, the Waltham Black Act 1722, the Criminal Law Act 1722, or the Criminal Law Act 1723, was an act of the Parliament of Great Britain. It was passed in 1723 in response to a series of raids against landowners by two groups of poachers, known as the Blacks from their habit of blacking their faces when they undertook the raids. The act was expanded over the years and greatly strengthened the criminal law by specifying over 200 capital crimes, many with intensified punishment. Arson, for example, had its definition expanded to include the new crime of burning (or threatening to burn) haystacks.

The legal rights of suspects and defendants under the act were strictly limited. For example, suspects who did not surrender within 40 days could be summarily judged guilty and sentenced to execution, so that if they were apprehended at a later date they could be executed without delay. Villages were punished if they failed to find, prosecute and convict alleged criminals.

The act originated in the aftermath of the South Sea Bubble collapse and the ensuing economic downturn. The Blacks quickly demonstrated both "a calculated programme of action, and a conscious social resentment", and their activities led to the introduction of the Black Act to Parliament on 26 April 1723. The act came into force on 27 May and introduced the death penalty for over 350 criminal offences, including being found disguised in a forest and carrying a weapon; "no other single statute passed during the eighteenth century equalled [the Black Act] in severity, and none appointed the punishment of death in so many cases". A criminal law reform campaign in the early 19th century caused it to be largely repealed on 8 July 1823, when a reform bill introduced by Robert Peel came into force.

The Building Act 1774 (14 Geo. 3. c. 78), which imposed restrictions on exterior decoration, was also known as the Black Act.

== Background ==
The Waltham Blacks in Lives of the Most Remarkable Criminals 1735 ed. Arthur L. Hayward

Following the 1720 South Sea Bubble collapse, Britain suffered an economic downturn that led to heightened social tensions. A small element of the social unrest was the activity of two groups of poachers that were based in Hampshire and Windsor Forest respectively. The first flurry of activity came from the Hampshire group and began in October 1721 when 16 poachers assembled in Farnham to raid the park of the Bishop of Winchester. Three deer were carried off and two others killed. Four of the poachers were later caught, with two released for lack of evidence and the others pilloried and sentenced to a year and a day in prison. The poachers became known as the "Blacks", because of their practice of blackening their faces to prevent identification; most famously, a Hampshire group became known as the "Waltham Blacks". After the convictions, the poachers decided to attack the Bishop's property again, which demonstrated "a calculated programme of action, and a conscious social resentment" that distinguished them from normal poachers. In reprisal for the earlier arrests and sentences, they took 11 deer and killed many more, which led to a royal proclamation offering £100 (equivalent to £19,000 in 2025) for information that led to the arrest of the gang.

More raids followed, highlighting a "fairly direct class hatred", culminating in the raid of a shipment of wine ordered for Frederick, Prince of Wales. That proved to be the final straw, with Sir Francis Page, a "notorious hanging judge", sent to the Winchester Assizes to preside over any prosecutions; this forced the Hampshire Blacks underground. The Windsor Blacks then began their activities, copying the Hampshire group. Their main target was Caversham Park, owned by the Earl of Cadogan, with a series of increasingly-audacious raids in 1722 and 1723, including one in which a gamekeeper's son was killed. As a response to the apparent spread of purposeful and organized raids by groups of poachers, the government introduced the Black Act, formally "An Act for the more effectual punishing wicked and evil disposed Persons going armed in Disguise and doing Injuries and Violence to the Persons and Properties of His Majesty's Subjects, and for the more speedy bringing the Offenders to Justice", to Parliament on 26 April 1723. It came into force on 27 May.

At the time, it was thought that the Blacks were Jacobites, and Sir Robert Walpole encouraged the spread of that idea to advance his own interests. The rationale for the act has been described as "at least as much to do with the hysteria induced by Walpole ... as with any need for new powers to fight deer-stealing".

In March 1723, Philip Caryll was arrested by the government for drinking to the Old Pretender's health in the home of the latter's former nurse in Portsea, Portsmouth. An innkeeper of Horndean testified that Caryll held meetings at his inn with the former Tory MP Sir Henry Goring, who fled to France after the Jacobite Atterbury Plot had been discovered in August 1722. It quickly became known to the Dutch ambassador that Goring had requested the Waltham Blacks' support for a Jacobite rising. The ambassador wrote that the Blacks were originally a group of smugglers and that their Jacobite allegiance was the primary reason for the passing of the Black Act. Goring wrote to the Pretender on 6 May 1723:

I had settled an affair with five gentlemen of that country who were each of them to raise a regiment of dragoons well mounted and well armed which I knew they could easily do for the men had horses and homes of their own, and were, to say the truth most of them, the persons who some time since robbed the late Bishop of Winchester's Park, and have increased in their number ever since. They go by the name of the Waltham Blacks (tho few of them live there) which is a most loyal little town. ... I once saw two hundred and upwards of these Blacks in a body within half a mile of my house. They had been running brandy. There was 24 customs officers following them who they abused heartily and carried off their cargo. I am told there is no less than a thousand of them and indeed I believe they have now taken loyalty into their heads, and will I hope prove very useful.

== Provisions ==
The act dealt with any offender who was armed and with a blacked face, armed and otherwise disguised, merely blacked, merely disguised, accessories after the fact or "any other person or persons". Anyone in one of the above categories found in a forest, chase, down or Royal Park could be sentenced to death. Similarly, it was an offence to hunt, kill, wound or steal deer in those locations, with the first offence punishable by a fine and the second by penal transportation. Other criminalised activities included fishing, the hunting of hares, the destruction of fish-ponds, the destruction of trees and the killing of cattle in those locations, the last of which was punishable by death. An offender could also be executed for setting fire to corn, hay, straw, wood, houses or barns or shooting another person. The same penalties applied to attempting to rescue anyone imprisoned under the Black Act or attempting to solicit other people to participate in crimes that violated it. In total, the act introduced the death penalty for over 350 criminal acts.

== Aftermath ==
Three of the Blacks' leaders had already been captured during the passage of the act although one later escaped, and a series of government raids captured a total of 32 Blacks who were tried after the act's passage in Reading. Four were sentenced to death for the killing of the gamekeeper's son, and were executed on 15 June 1723. Trials for the others continued into 1724, and seven more were captured and tried on 7 December. That marked the effective end of the Blacks as an organised group.

As late as the Jacobite rising of 1745–46, newspapers reported that the Blacks had reappeared in Hampshire, where they had stolen deer and robbed parks.

Modern scholars have differed in their view of whether the Blacks were Jacobites. Some argue that the links between the Blacks and the Jacobites were "fantasies" and that the Blacks were "simply a mixed group of foresters: labourers, yeomen and some gentry defending their customary rights". Others, however, have claimed that the Blacks were closely connected with Jacobitism and that the Black Act was designed to combat that political threat. Sir Geoffrey Elton claimed that the act was "passed not in order to suppress legitimate protest but because organized gangs were destroying deer and planning a Jacobite rising".

The act has been described as "severe and sanguinary", and L. Radzinowicz noted in the Cambridge Law Journal that "no other single statute passed during the eighteenth century equalled [the Black Act] in severity, and none appointed the punishment of death in so many cases". Efforts to repeal it started in 1810, with comments by William Grant as part of a wider debate on penal reform. A formal recommendation for its repeal took almost a decade to appear, with the publication of the Report on Criminal Laws in 1819 that marked the first "official" suggestion that the law be removed from the statute books. Following the publication of that Report, Sir James Mackintosh introduced a law reform bill that would have repealed the act, but although it passed through the House of Commons, it was strongly opposed in the House of Lords. In 1823, he submitted a memo to the House of Commons, again to suggest the repeal of the act, and a few months later, Robert Peel, the Home Secretary, introduced a bill to repeal most of the Black Act, while maintaining the parts that criminalised setting fire to houses and shooting a person. That repeal passed and came into effect on 8 July 1823. The act was entirely repealed by the Criminal Statutes Repeal Act 1827.

== See also ==
- Bloody Code

== Bibliography ==
- Broad, John (1988). "Whigs and deer-stealers in other guises: A return to the origins of the Black Act". Past & Present (119). Oxford University Press: 56–72. doi:10.1093/past/119.1.56. ISSN 1477-464X.
- Paul Kleber Monod, Jacobitism and the English People, 1688–1788 (Cambridge University Press, 1993).
- Radzinowicz, L. (1945). "The Waltham Black Act: A study of the legislative attitude towards crime in the eighteenth century". Cambridge Law Journal. 9 (1): 56–81. doi:10.1017/S0008197300122639. ISSN 0008-1973. S2CID 144547451.
- Rogers, Pat (1974). "The Waltham blacks and the Black Act". The Historical Journal. 17 (3): 465–486. doi:10.1017/S0018246X00005252. ISSN 0018-246X. S2CID 159741413.
- Vann, Richard T. (1977). "Reviews". American Journal of Legal History. 21 (2). Temple University Beasley School of Law. ISSN 0002-9319.
