= List of acts of the Parliament of Great Britain from 1732 =

This is a complete list of acts of the Parliament of Great Britain for the year 1732.

For acts passed until 1707, see the list of acts of the Parliament of England and the list of acts of the Parliament of Scotland. See also the list of acts of the Parliament of Ireland.

For acts passed from 1801 onwards, see the list of acts of the Parliament of the United Kingdom. For acts of the devolved parliaments and assemblies in the United Kingdom, see the list of acts of the Scottish Parliament, the list of acts of the Northern Ireland Assembly, and the list of acts and measures of Senedd Cymru; see also the list of acts of the Parliament of Northern Ireland.

The number shown after each act's title is its chapter number. Acts are cited using this number, preceded by the year(s) of the reign during which the relevant parliamentary session was held; thus the Union with Ireland Act 1800 is cited as "39 & 40 Geo. 3. c. 67", meaning the 67th act passed during the session that started in the 39th year of the reign of George III and which finished in the 40th year of that reign. Note that the modern convention is to use Arabic numerals in citations (thus "41 Geo. 3" rather than "41 Geo. III"). Acts of the last session of the Parliament of Great Britain and the first session of the Parliament of the United Kingdom are both cited as "41 Geo. 3".

Acts passed by the Parliament of Great Britain did not have a short title; however, some of these acts have subsequently been given a short title by acts of the Parliament of the United Kingdom (such as the Short Titles Act 1896).

Before the Acts of Parliament (Commencement) Act 1793 came into force on 8 April 1793, acts passed by the Parliament of Great Britain were deemed to have come into effect on the first day of the session in which they were passed. Because of this, the years given in the list below may in fact be the year before a particular act was passed.

== 6 Geo. 2 ==
The sixth session of the 7th Parliament of Great Britain, which met from 16 January 1733 until 13 June 1733.

This session was also traditionally cited as 6 G. 2.

=== Public acts ===
Short title	Citation	Royal assent
Long title
Taxation Act 1732 (repealed)	6 Geo. 2. c. 1	22 February 1733
An Act for continuing the Duties upon Malt, Mum, Cyder, and Perry, in that Part of Great Britain called England; and for granting to His Majesty certain Duties upon Malt, Mum, Cyder, and Perry, in that Part of Great Britain called Scotland, for the Service of the Year One Thousand Seven Hundred and Thirty-three; and for giving further Time to Clerks and Apprentices to pay Duties omitted to be paid for their Indentures and Contracts. (Repealed by Statute Law Revision Act 1867 (30 & 31 Vict. c. 59))
Charitable Corporation Act 1732 (repealed)	6 Geo. 2. c. 2	22 February 1733
An Act to allow a further Time to John Thomson to appear, and produce the Books, and discover the Effects, of the Charitable Corporation for Relief of industrious Poor, by assisting them with small Sums upon Pledges, at legal Interest; and to be examined thereupon at the Times and Places fixed in the Bill; and for allowing the said John Thomson a Proportion out of the Effects of the said Corporation which he shall discover; and for preventing fraudulent releasing or assigning any Debt due from George Robinson or the said John Thomson, or either of them. (Repealed by Statute Law Revision Act 1948 (11 & 12 Geo. 6. c. 62))
Mutiny Act 1732 (repealed)	6 Geo. 2. c. 3	21 March 1733
An Act for punishing Mutiny and Desertion, and for the better Payment of the Army and their Quarters. (Repealed by Statute Law Revision Act 1867 (30 & 31 Vict. c. 59))
Indemnity Act 1732 (repealed)	6 Geo. 2. c. 4	21 March 1733
An Act to indemnify Persons who have omitted to qualify themselves for Employments or Offices, by taking the Oaths, and making and subscribing the Declaration against Transubstantiation, and receiving the Sacrament; and allowing them further Time for that Purpose. (Repealed by Statute Law Revision Act 1867 (30 & 31 Vict. c. 59))
Papists Act 1732 (repealed)	6 Geo. 2. c. 5	21 March 1733
An Act for allowing further Time for the Enrolment of Deeds and Wills made by Papists; and for Relief of Protestant Purchasers and Lessees. (Repealed by Statute Law Revision Act 1867 (30 & 31 Vict. c. 59))
Receipt of the Exchequer Act 1732 (repealed)	6 Geo. 2. c. 6	21 March 1733
An Act for obviating a Doubt which may arise, upon an Act made in the Fourth Year of His present Majesty's Reign, intituled, "An Act that all Proceedings in the Courts of Justice, within that Part of Great Britain called England, and in the Court of Exchequer in Scotland, shall be in the English Language," (Note: Proceedings in Courts of Justice Act 1730 (4 Geo. 2. c. 26)) so far as the same Act doth or may relate to the Court of the Receipt of His Majesty's Exchequer, or to any Members or Branches thereof. (Repealed by Office of Receipt of Exchequer Act 1834 (4 & 5 Will. 4. c. 15))
Importation Act 1732 (repealed)	6 Geo. 2. c. 7	21 March 1733
An Act for the free Importation and Exportation of Diamonds, Pearls, Rubies, Emeralds, and all other Jewels and precious Stones. (Repealed by Repeal of Acts Concerning Importation (No. 2) Act 1822 (3 Geo. 4. c. 42))
Church of Saint George, Southwark Act 1732 (repealed)	6 Geo. 2. c. 8	21 March 1733
An Act for re-building the Parish Church of St. George the Martyr, in the Borough of Southwark, in the County of Surrey, as One of the Fifty new Churches directed to be built by Two Acts of Parliament, One made in the Ninth, the other in the Tenth, Year of the Reign of Her late Majesty Queen Anne. (Repealed by Statute Law (Repeals) Act 2013 (c. 2))
River Dun Navigation Act 1732	6 Geo. 2. c. 9	21 March 1733
An Act to explain and amend Two Acts of Parliament, One made in the Twelfth, (Note: River Dun Navigation Act 1725 (12 Geo. 1. c. 38)) and the other in the Thirteenth, (Note: River Dun Navigation Act 1726 (13 Geo. 1. c. 20)) Year of His late Majesty's Reign, for making navigable the River Dun, in the County of York; and for the better persecting and maintaining the said Navigation; and for uniting the several Proprietors thereof into One Company.
Land Tax Act 1732 (repealed)	6 Geo. 2. c. 10	17 May 1733
An Act for granting an Aid to His Majesty, by a Land Tax, to be raised in Great Britain, for the Service of the Year One Thousand Seven Hundred and Thirty-three. (Repealed by Statute Law Revision Act 1867 (30 & 31 Vict. c. 59))
Horsleydown Parish Act 1732 (repealed)	6 Geo. 2. c. 11	17 May 1733
An Act for providing a Maintenance for the Minister of the new Church of Horslydown, in the Borough of Southwark, in the County of Surrey; and for making the District assigned to the same a distinct Parish; and for other Purposes therein mentioned. (Repealed by St. John Southwark Vestry Voting Act 1824 (5 Geo. 4. c. lxxiv) and London Government (Borough of Bermondsey) Order in Council 1901 (SR&O 1901/264))
Littlehampton Harbour Act 1732 (repealed)	6 Geo. 2. c. 12	17 May 1733
An Act for erecting Piers in, and for repairing and keeping in Repair, the Harbour of Little Hampton, called Arundell Port, in the County of Sussex. (Repealed by Littlehampton Harbour and Arun Drainage Outfall Act 1927 (17 & 18 Geo. 5. c. lxvii))
Trade of Sugar Colonies Act 1732 or the Molasses Act 1733 (repealed)	6 Geo. 2. c. 13	17 May 1733
An Act for the better securing and encouraging the Trade of His Majesty's Sugar Colonies in America. (Repealed by Statute Law Revision Act 1867 (30 & 31 Vict. c. 59))
Courts in Wales and Chester Act 1732 (repealed)	6 Geo. 2. c. 14	17 May 1733
An Act for the more effectual preventing frivolous and vexatious Arrests; and for the more easy Recovery of Debts and Damages, in the Courts of Great Sessions in the Principality of Wales, and in the Court of Assize in the County Palatine of Chester; and for the obviating a Doubt which has arisen upon an Act made in the Fourth Year of His present Majesty's Reign, intituled, "An Act that all Proceedings in Courts of Justice, within that Part of Great Britain called England, and in the Court of Exchequer in Scotland, shall be in the English Language," (Note: Proceedings in Courts of Justice Act 1730 (4 Geo. 2. c. 26)) so far as the same Act doth or may relate to the Courts of Justice holden within the said Principality; and for explaining and amending the said Act. (Repealed by Civil Procedure Acts Repeal Act 1879 (42 & 43 Vict. c. 59))
Hertford and Ware Roads Act 1732 (repealed)	6 Geo. 2. c. 15	17 May 1733
An Act for making more effectual an Act passed in the Eleventh Year of the Reign of His late Majesty King George the First, (Note: Hertford and Ware Roads Act 1724 (11 Geo. 1. c. 11)) for repairing the Roads therein mentioned, from the Parish of Enfield, in the County of Middlesex, to the Town of Hertford, and to the great Bridge in Ware, in the County of Hertford; and for amending the Road from the said great Bridge, to the South End of the great Bridge at Wade's Mill; and from the great Road at Cheshunt, to the West End of Small Lea Bridge, in the said County of Hertford. (Repealed by Roads from Hertford and Ware Act 1813 (53 Geo. 3. c. xxvii) and Roads from Hertford and Ware Act 1833 (3 & 4 Will. 4. c. xlii))
Fyfield and St. John's Bridge Road Act 1732 (repealed)	6 Geo. 2. c. 16	17 May 1733
An Act for repairing the Roads leading from a Place called St. John's Bridge, in the County of Berks, to a Place called Fyfield, in the said County. (Repealed by Fyfield and St. John's Bridge, and Kingston Bagpuize and Newbridge Roads Act 1833 (3 & 4 Will. 4. c. xci))
Spirit Duties Act 1732 (repealed)	6 Geo. 2. c. 17	17 May 1733
An Act for repealing an Act (Note: Taxation (No. 2) Act 1728 (2 Geo. 2. c. 17)) for laying a Duty on Compound Waters or Spirits, and for licensing the Retailers thereof; and for determining certain Duties on French Brandy, and for granting other Duties in Lieu thereof; and for enforcing the Laws for preventing the Running of Brandies. (Repealed by Statute Law Revision Act 1867 (30 & 31 Vict. c. 59))
Linlithgow Beer Duties Act 1732 (repealed)	6 Geo. 2. c. 18	17 May 1733
An Act for continuing a Duty of Two Pennies Scots, or One Sixth Part of a Penny Sterling, upon every Scots Pint of Ale and Beer brewed and sold within the Town of Linlithgow, and Liberties thereof, in the County of West Lothian, for paying the Debts of the said Town, and other Purposes therein mentioned. (Repealed by Statute Law Revision Act 1948 (11 & 12 Geo. 6. c. 62))
Tiverton Chapel Act 1732	6 Geo. 2. c. 19	17 May 1733
An Act for making a Chapel in the Town of Tiverton, in the County of Devon, a perpetual Cure; and for providing a Maintenance for the Ministers who shall officiate therein.
Suffolk Roads Act 1732 (repealed)	6 Geo. 2. c. 20	17 May 1733
An Act for enlarging the Term and Powers granted by an Act passed in the Tenth Year of the Reign of Her late Majesty Queen Anne, intituled, "An Act for the better repairing and amending the Road leading from Ipswich to Cleydon, and the Road called The Pye Road, in the County of Suffolk;" (Note: Suffolk Roads Act 1711 (10 Ann. c. 42)) and for amending the Roads leading from Yaxley Bull, through Eye, to Lanthorn Green, in the said County. (Repealed by Ipswich and Yaxley Roads Act 1793 (33 Geo. 3. c. 128))
Cripplegate Church Building Act 1732 (repealed)	6 Geo. 2. c. 21	17 May 1733
An Act for providing a Maintenance for the Rector of the new Church near Old Street, in the Parish of St. Giles, Cripplegate; and for making that Part of the said Parish which is called The Lordship Part a distinct Parish; and for empowering the Commissioners for building of the Fifty new Churches to apply a Sum of Money, to wall-in the said Church and Church-yard, and to erect a House for the Habitation of the Rector of the said Church, out of the Money appropriated for the Endowment of the said Fifty new Churches. (Repealed by St. Luke, Middlesex, Poor Relief Act 1808 (48 Geo. 3. c. xcvii) and London Government (Borough of Finsbury) Order in Council 1901 (SR&O 1901/266))
Fleet Ditch Act 1732	6 Geo. 2. c. 22	17 May 1733
An Act for filling up such Part of the Channel of Bridewell Dock and Fleet Ditch as lies between Holborn Bridge and Fleet Bridge; and for converting the Ground, when filled up, to the Use of the City of London.
Holdings of County Courts Act 1732 (repealed)	6 Geo. 2. c. 23	17 May 1733
An Act to explain and amend an Act made in the Seventh and Eighth Years of the Reign of King William the Third, intituled, "An Act for the further regulating Elections of Members to serve in Parliament; and for the preventing irregular Proceedings of Sheriffs and other Officers, in the electing and returning such Members," (Note: Parliamentary Elections Act 1695 (7 & 8 Will. 3. c. 25)) so far as the same relates to the holding of County Courts. (Repealed by Statute Law Revision Act 1867 (30 & 31 Vict. c. 59))
Hertfordshire Roads Act 1732 (repealed)	6 Geo. 2. c. 24	17 May 1733
An Act for the more effectual repairing the Roads leading from Wade's Mill, in the County of Hertford, to Barley and Royston, in the said County. (Repealed by Roads from Wadesmill to Barley and Royston Act 1821 (1 & 2 Geo. 4. c. xvii) and Annual Turnpike Acts Continuance Act 1872 (35 & 36 Vict. c. 85))
Supply, etc. Act 1732 (repealed)	6 Geo. 2. c. 25	13 June 1733
An Act for enabling His Majesty to apply Five Hundred Thousand Pounds, out of the Sinking Fund, for the Service of the Year One Thousand Seven Hundred and Thirty-three; and for the further Disposition of the said Fund, by paying off One Million of South Sea Annuities; and for enabling His Majesty, out of the Monies arisen by Sale of Lands in the Island of St. Christopher, to pay the Sum of Eighty Thousand Pounds for the Marriage Portion of the Princess Royal, and Ten Thousand Pounds to the Trustees for establishing the Colony of Georgia in America; and for making good all Deficiencies and Charges by taking of Broad Pieces into the Mint, out of the Coinage Duty; and for appropriating the Supplies granted in this Session of Parliament; and for issuing to the Sub-dean, Treasurer, and Steward, of the Collegiate Church of St. Peter, Westminster, out of the Monies reserved for building Fifty New Churches within the Cities of London and Westminster, and the Suburbs thereof, and for making Provisions for the Ministers of the same, Four Thousand Pounds for the Repair of the said Collegiate Church, and Twelve Hundred Pounds for finishing the Dormitory belonging thereunto. (Repealed by Statute Law Revision Act 1867 (30 & 31 Vict. c. 59))
Coin Act 1732 (repealed)	6 Geo. 2. c. 26	13 June 1733
An Act to prevent the coining or counterfeiting any of the Gold Coins commonly called Broad Pieces. (Repealed by Statute Law Revision Act 1867 (30 & 31 Vict. c. 59))
Attorneys and Solicitors Act 1732 (repealed)	6 Geo. 2. c. 27	13 June 1733
An Act to explain and amend an Act made in the Second Year of His present Majesty's Reign, intituled, "An Act for the better Regulation of Attornies and Solicitors." (Note: Attorneys and Solicitors Act 1728 (2 Geo. 2. c. 23)) (Repealed by Solicitors Act 1843 (6 & 7 Vict. c. 73))
National Debt Act 1732 (repealed)	6 Geo. 2. c. 28	13 June 1733
An Act for the converting a further Part of the Capital Stock of the South Sea Company into Annuities, redeemable by Parliament; and for settling the remaining Part of the said Stock in the said Company. (Repealed by Statute Law Revision Act 1870 (33 & 34 Vict. c. 69))
River Thames (Lastage and Ballastage) Act 1732 (repealed)	6 Geo. 2. c. 29	13 June 1733
An Act for the better Regulation of Lastage and Ballastage in the River Thames. (Repealed by Thames Lastage and Ballastage Act 1805 (45 Geo. 3. c. xcviii))
River Dee Navigation Act 1732	6 Geo. 2. c. 30	13 June 1733
An Act to recover and preserve the Navigation of the River Dee, in the County Palatine of Chester.
Bastard Children Act 1732 (repealed)	6 Geo. 2. c. 31	13 June 1733
An Act for the Relief of Parishes, and other Places, from such Charges as may arise from Bastard Children born within the same. (Repealed by Statute Law Revision Act 1867 (30 & 31 Vict. c. 59))
Richard Norton's Will Act 1732 (repealed)	6 Geo. 2. c. 32	13 June 1733
An Act to enable certain Persons to propound the Papers, importing to be the last Will, Codicils, and Testamentary Schedules, of Richard Norton, late of Southwick, in the County of Southampton, Esquire, deceased, in the Prerogative Court of Canterbury; and to sue for Administration with the same annexed. (Repealed by Statute Law (Repeals) Act 1977 (c. 18))
Whale Fishery Act 1732 (repealed)	6 Geo. 2. c. 33	13 June 1733
An Act for the further Encouragement of the Whale Fishery carried on by His Majesty's British Subjects. (Repealed by Statute Law Revision Act 1867 (30 & 31 Vict. c. 59))
Quarantine Act 1732 (repealed)	6 Geo. 2. c. 34	13 June 1733
An Act for reviving so much of the Act made in the First Year of His Majesty's Reign, intituled, "An Act to oblige Ships coming from Places infected more effectually to perform their Quarantine; and for the better preventing the Plague being brought from Foreign Parts into Great Britain or Ireland, or the Isles of Guernsey, Jersey, Alderney, Sark, or Man; and to hinder the spreading of Infection," (Note: Quarantine Act 1727 (1 Geo. 2. St. 2. c. 13)) as relates to the performing of Quarantine, and preventing the spreading of Infection; and to enable His Majesty to prohibit Commerce with any Country or Place infected with the Plague, for a certain Time therein limited. (Repealed by Statute Law Revision Act 1867 (30 & 31 Vict. c. 59))
Lotteries Act 1732 (repealed)	6 Geo. 2. c. 35	13 June 1733
An Act for appointing Commissioners, to examine, state, and report, who of the Sufferers in the Charitable Corporation are Objects of Compassion, according to the Descriptions therein mentioned; and for giving Relief to such Sufferers; and for enforcing the Laws made against Foreign Lotteries; and for empowering the said Commissioners to hear and determine the Claims of such Creditors and Proprietors of the said Corporation as have not made their Claims within the Time limited by an Act made in the last Session of Parliament, (Note: Charitable Corporation (Claims and Disputes) Act 1731 (5 Geo. 2. c. 31)) for taking, stating, and determining, all the Claims and Demands of the Creditors of the said Corporation, and of all Persons claiming any Share or Interest in the Stock or Fund of the said Corporation. (Repealed for England and Wales and Scotland by Betting and Lotteries Act 1934 (24 & 25 Geo. 5. c. 58) and for Northern Ireland by Betting and Lotteries Act (Northern Ireland) 1957 (c. 19 (N.I.)))
Charitable Corporation (Arrangements with Creditors) Act 1732 (repealed)	6 Geo. 2. c. 36	13 June 1733
An Act for making effectual such Agreement as shall be made between the Charitable Corporation for Relief of industrious Poor, by assisting them with small Sums upon Pledges, at legal Interest, and their Creditors. (Repealed by Statute Law Revision Act 1948 (11 & 12 Geo. 6. c. 62))
Perpetuation of Various Laws Act 1732 (repealed)	6 Geo. 2. c. 37	13 June 1733
An Act for making perpetual the several Acts (Note: Juries Act 1729 (3 Geo. 2. c. 25)) (Note: Juries Act 1730 (4 Geo. 2. c. 7)) therein mentioned, for the better Regulation of Juries; and for empowering the Justices of Session or Assizes, for the Counties Palatine of Chester, Lancaster, and Durham, to appoint a Special Jury, in Manner therein mentioned; and for continuing the Act (Note: Cloth Manufacturer Act 1724 (11 Geo. 1. c. 24)) for regulating the Manufacture of Cloth in the West Riding of the County of York, except a Clause therein contained; and for continuing an Act (Note: Criminal Law Act 1722 (9 Geo. 1. c. 22)) for the more effectual punishing wicked and evil-disposed Persons going armed in Disguise, and for other Purposes therein mentioned; and to prevent the cutting or breaking down the Bank of any River, or any Sea Bank; and to prevent the malicious cutting of Hop-binds; and for continuing an Act made in the Thirteenth and Fourteenth Years of the Reign of King Charles the Second, (Note: Moss Troopers Act 1662 (14 Cha. 2. c. 22)) for preventing Theft and Rapine on the Northern Borders of England; and for reviving and continuing certain Clauses in Two other Acts, (Note: Moss Troopers Act 1666 (18 & 19 Cha. 2. c. 3)) (Note: Moss Troopers Act 1677 (29 & 30 Cha. 2. c. 2)) made for the same Purpose. (Repealed for England and Wales by Criminal Statutes Repeal Act 1827 (7 & 8 Geo. 4. c. 27) and for India by Criminal Law (India) Act 1828 (9 Geo. 4. c. 74))
Exportation Act 1732 (repealed)	6 Geo. 2. c. 38	13 June 1733
An Act for enlarging the Time for Exportation of Tea. (Repealed by Statute Law Revision Act 1867 (30 & 31 Vict. c. 59))

=== Private acts ===
Short title	Citation	Royal assent
Long title
Welsborne Hastings and Newbold Pacy (Warwickshire) Inclosures Act 1732	6 Geo. 2. c. 1 Pr.	22 February 1733
An Act for enclosing several large Common Fields, within the Parishes of Wellsbourne Hastings and Newbold Pacy, in the County of Warwick.
Exemplifying the marriage settlements of Henry late Earl of Thomond and the present Earl of Thomond and making them evidence in all Irish courts.	6 Geo. 2. c. 2 Pr.	21 March 1733
An Act for exemplifying Two Marriage Settlements, made on the Marriage of Henry late Earl of Thomond, and the present Earl of Thomond; and for making the same Evidence in all Courts of Law and Equity in Ireland.
Barston Inclosure Act 1732	6 Geo. 2. c. 3 Pr.	21 March 1733
An Act for dividing and enclosing the Common Fields and Common Meadows, in the Parish of Barston, in the County of Warwick.
Sheldon's Estate Act 1732	6 Geo. 2. c. 4 Pr.	21 March 1733
An Act for discharging divers Lands and Hereditaments at Aberton, in the County of Worcester, Part of the Estate of Francis Sheldon Esquire, a Lunatic, from the Trusts of a former Act of Parliament, (Note: Francis Sheldon's Estate Act 1727 (1 Geo. 2. St. 2. c. 27 Pr.)) made for Payment of the Debts of the said Francis Sheldon; and for vesting another Estate of the said Lunatic, in the County of Gloucester, in Trustees, for the same Purpose.
Naturalization of Justus Gerhard, Paul L'Hospital, William Hamburger and others.	6 Geo. 2. c. 5 Pr.	21 March 1733
An Act to naturalize Justus Gerhard, Paul L'Hospital, William Christian Hamburger, and others.
Chipping Warden Inclosure Act 1732	6 Geo. 2. c. 6 Pr.	17 May 1733
An Act for enclosing and dividing the Common Fields and Common Grounds, lying in the Manor and Parish of Chipping Warden, in the County of Northampton.
Buckland Newton Inclosure Act 1732	6 Geo. 2. c. 7 Pr.	17 May 1733
An Act for enclosing and dividing the Common Fields and Common Grounds, in the Tithing of Buckland Newton, Mineterne Parva, and Knowle, in the Parish of Buckland Newton, alias Buckland Abbas, in the County of Dorset.
Aston Magna Inclosure Act 1732	6 Geo. 2. c. 8 Pr.	17 May 1733
An Act for dividing and enclosing the Hamlet of Aston Magna, in the Parish of Blockley, in the County of Worcester.
Enabling Viscountess Gage and her trustees and Thomas Whorwood to purchase lands of inheritance with proceeds of sale of estates in Berkshire.	6 Geo. 2. c. 9 Pr.	17 May 1733
An Act to enable the Lady Viscountess Gage and her Trustees, and Thomas Whorwood Esquire, to purchase Lands of Inheritance with the Money arising by Sale of their Estate in the County of Bucks.
Lord Abergavenny's Estate Act 1732	6 Geo. 2. c. 10 Pr.	17 May 1733
An Act for Sale of the Manors of Kidderminster Borough and Kidderminster Forren, Part of the entailed Estate of William Lord Abergavenny; and for laying out the Money arising by such Sale in the Purchase of another Estate, to be settled to the same Uses.
Griffith Davies' and Arthur Dagget's Estate Act 1732	6 Geo. 2. c. 11 Pr.	17 May 1733
An Act for vesting divers Lands and Tithes in Hothorpe, in the County of Northampton, the Estate late of Griffith Davies deceased, and of Arthur Dagget, in Trustees, to such Uses as the Manor of Hothorpe aforesaid stands settled; and for other Purposes therein mentioned.
Confirmation of articles of agreement between Lord Archibald Hamilton, George Earl of Macclesfield and others, trustees of a charity, for vesting in George Earl of Orkney lands in Berkshire upon certain trusts.	6 Geo. 2. c. 12 Pr.	17 May 1733
An Act to confirm Articles of Agreement, entered into between Archibald Hamilton Esquire, commonly called Lord Archibald Hamilton, and others, and George Earl of Macclesfield and others, Trustees of a Charity, for vesting in George Earl of Orkney and his Heirs, certain Lands in the County of Berks, to the several Uses, and upon the Trusts, therein mentioned.
Enabling William Lord Widdrington to sue or maintain any action despite his attainder, and removing any disability in him to inherit any real or personal estate which may come to him, or which he was entitled to in reversion or remainder before his attainder.	6 Geo. 2. c. 13 Pr.	17 May 1733
An Act to enable William Widdrington, late Lord Widdrington, to sue or maintain any Action or Suit, notwithstanding his Attainder; and to remove any Disability in him, by reason of his said Attainder, to take and inherit any Real or Personal Estate that may or shall hereafter descend or come to him, or which he was entitled unto, in Reversion or Remainder, before his Attainder.
Duke of Atholl's Estate (Amendment) Act 1732	6 Geo. 2. c. 14 Pr.	17 May 1733
An Act to explain and amend an Act passed in the First Year of the Reign of His late Majesty King George the First, intituled, "An Act for vesting the Honour and Estate of John Duke of Atholl in James Murray (commonly called Lord James Murray), after the Death of the said Duke." (Note: Vesting Duke of Atholl in James Murray Act 1715 (1 Geo. 1. St. 2. c. 34 Pr.))
William Savory's Estate Act 1732	6 Geo. 2. c. 15 Pr.	17 May 1733
An Act for Sale of Part of the Paternal Estate of William Savery Esquire, comprized in his Marriage Settlement, to discharge the Incumbrances on other the more valuable Parts of his Estate, in the same Settlement comprized, for the Benefit of his Issue by Mary his late Wife.
Rendering more useful and preventing potential inconveniences arising from a covenant in George Pitt's marriage settlement and for making effectual the agreements made by parties for that purpose contained in a recent indenture of settlement.	6 Geo. 2. c. 16 Pr.	17 May 1733
An Act for rendering more useful, and preventing the Inconveniencies likely to arise from a Covenant in, the Marriage Settlement made by George Pitt Esquire; and for making good and effectual the Agreements, Limitations, and Provisions, made by the Parties for that Purpose, contained in an Indenture of Settlement lately made.
Prestwood's Estate Act 1732	6 Geo. 2. c. 17 Pr.	17 May 1733
An Act for Sale of Part of the Estate of Thomas Prestwood Esquire, in the County of Devon, for discharging an Incumbrance affecting the same; and other Purposes therein mentioned.
Thomas Warden's Name Act 1732	6 Geo. 2. c. 18 Pr.	17 May 1733
An Act to enable Thomas Warden Esquire and the Heirs of his Body, and the several other Persons therein named, and the Heirs of their respective Bodies, to take and use the Surname of Sergison, as therein mentioned.
Empowering Sir John and Charles Tynte and their sons to make leases of estates in Sir Halswell Tynte's settlement.	6 Geo. 2. c. 19 Pr.	17 May 1733
An Act for empowering Sir John Tynte Baronet and Charles Tynte Esquire, and their Sons respectively, to make Leases of the Estates comprized in the late Sir Halswell Tynte's Settlement, for Lives, or Years determinable on Deaths, according to the Custom of the Country.
Drax's Estate Act 1732	6 Geo. 2. c. 20 Pr.	17 May 1733
An Act to enable Thomas Erle Drax Esquire, an Infant, and others, to grant Leases of several Manors and Lands in the County of Wilts, in such Manner as is therein mentioned.
Rudd's Divorce Act 1732	6 Geo. 2. c. 21 Pr.	17 May 1733
An Act to dissolve the Marriage of Sir John Rudd Baronet, with Lettice Vaughan, and to enable him to marry again; and for other Purposes therein mentioned.
Bawtry's Estate Act 1732	6 Geo. 2. c. 22 Pr.	17 May 1733
An Act for settling the Estate of Thomas Bawtry, late of Foston, in the County of York, Esquire, deceased, in his Surname and Blood; and making his Will more effectual for that Purpose.
Division of site of dissolved monastery of Bellalanda, alias Byland, and other lands in Yorkshire amongst Thomas Holles Duke of Newcastle, Philip Dorner Earl of Chesterfield and Gervase Scrope.	6 Geo. 2. c. 23 Pr.	17 May 1733
An Act for dividing the Scite of the late dissolved Monastery of Bellalanda, alias Byland, and divers Messuages, Lands, Tenements, and Hereditaments, in the County of York, amongst Thomas Holles Duke of Newcastle, Philip Dormer Earl of Chesterfield, and Gervase Scrope Esquire, in the Manner therein mentioned.
Hadleigh (Suffolk) Inclosure and Poor Relief (Amendment) Act 1732	6 Geo. 2. c. 24 Pr.	17 May 1733
An Act for explaining and amending Part of an Act made in the Second Year of the Reign of His present Majesty, intituled, "An Act for enclosing Aldham and Boyne Commons, belonging to the Parish of Hadleigh, in the County of Suffolk, for the better Maintenance of the Poor of the said Parish." (Note: Hadleigh (Suffolk) Inclosure and Poor Relief Act 1728 (2 Geo. 2. c. 25 Pr.))
Naturalization of Jean Lamotte and George Hasenfeller Act 1732	6 Geo. 2. c. 25 Pr.	17 May 1733
An Act to naturalize Jean Lagier Lamotte and George Godfried Hasenseller.
Confirmation of an exchange between Earl Cowper and Sir George Oxenden of lands and hereditaments in Kent.	6 Geo. 2. c. 26 Pr.	13 June 1733
An Act for confirming an Exchange agreed to be made, between William Earl Cowper and Sir George Oxenden Baronet, of certain Lands and Hereditaments, in the County of Kent.
Lord Castlemain's Name Act 1732	6 Geo. 2. c. 27 Pr.	13 June 1733
An Act to enable Richard Child Esquire (commonly called Lord Castlemain) and the Heirs of his Body, and such other Persons who, by virtue of a Settlement made by Frederick Tylney Esquire deceased, shall be in the Possession of the Estates therein limited, to take and use the Surname of Tylney.
Robert late Lord Bingley's will: enabling beneficiaries to make leases of 21 years at the best improved rents without taking fines.	6 Geo. 2. c. 28 Pr.	13 June 1733
An Act to enable the several Persons claiming under the Will or Codicil of Robert late Lord Bingley, when they shall be entitled to the Estates comprized therein, or directed to be purchased thereby, to make Leases for One and Twenty Years, at the best improved Rents, without taking Fines.
Cholmondeley's Estate Act 1732	6 Geo. 2. c. 29 Pr.	13 June 1733
An Act for vesting Part of the Estate of Charles Cholmondeley Esquire, in the County of Chester, in Trustees, to be sold, to raise Money, for the Payment of Debts, and other Purposes therein mentioned.
Making certain articles of an agreement made by Thomas Asheton on behalf of his son Thomas, concerning Robert Cholmondely of Holford's estate in Cheshire, obligatory on his son and vesting said estate in trustees for sale.	6 Geo. 2. c. 30 Pr.	13 June 1733
An Act for making certain Articles of Agreement, entered into by Thomas Asheton Esquire, in Behalf of his Son Thomas Asheton an Infant, touching the Estate late of Robert Cholmondeley, of Holford, in the County of Chester, Esquire, obligatory on the said Infant; and vesting the said Estate in Trustees, to be sold, for the Purposes therein expressed.
Dowdeswell's Estate Act 1732	6 Geo. 2. c. 31 Pr.	13 June 1733
An Act for enabling Richard Dowdeswell Esquire to raise Money, by Sale or Mortgage of his Estates in the Counties of Gloucester and Worcester, to pay off the Portion of his Niece, Anne Wylde the Younger, charged thereon.
Henley's Estate Act 1732	6 Geo. 2. c. 32 Pr.	13 June 1733
An Act for vesting Part of the settled Estates of Anthony Henley Esquire in Trustees, to be sold, for Discharge of the several Debts and Incumbrances affecting the same; and for making a further separate Provision for the Lady Elizabeth his Wife, during their joint Lives.
Roberts' Estate Act 1732	6 Geo. 2. c. 33 Pr.	13 June 1733
An Act for selling Part of the settled Estate of David Roberts Esquire, for discharging the Debts and Incumbrances of himself and his late Father; and for settling an Equivalent for the same, for the Benefit of the several Persons claiming under his Marriage Settlement.
Brandon's Estate Act 1732	6 Geo. 2. c. 34 Pr.	13 June 1733
An Act for vesting in Trustees the unsettled Estates of William Brandon deceased, to be sold, for Payment of a Debt due from him to the Crown; and for applying the Residue of the Money arising by such Sale for the Benefit of his Family.
Harvest's Estate Act 1732	6 Geo. 2. c. 35 Pr.	13 June 1733
An Act for enabling Trustees to make Leases of certain Messuages, Houses, and Buildings, in Mark Lane, in the City of London, the Estate of George Harvest, an Infant.
Hamilton's Restoration Act 1732	6 Geo. 2. c. 36 Pr.	13 June 1733
An Act for restoring Bazil Hamilton in Blood.

=== Sources ===
- Pickering, Danby, ed. (1765). "Anno sexto Georgii II". The Statutes at Large. Vol. 16: From the Second to the 9th Year of King George II. Cambridge: Joseph Bentham. pp. 364–440 – via Internet Archive.
- Pickering, Danby, ed. (1765). "Anno sexto Georgii II". The Statutes at Large. Vol. 16: From the Second to the 9th Year of King George II. Cambridge: Joseph Bentham. pp. 364–440 – via Google Books.
- Journals of the House of Commons. Vol. 22. London: His Majesty's Stationery Office. 1803. pp. 3–204 – via Google Books.
- Chronological Table of and Index to the Statutes. Vol. 1: To the End of the Session 59 Vict. Sess. 2 (1895) (13th ed.). London: Her Majesty's Stationery Office. 1896. p. 102 – via Google Books.

== See also ==
- List of acts of the Parliament of Great Britain
