= List of acts of the Parliament of the United Kingdom from 1985 =

This is a list of acts of the Parliament of the United Kingdom passed in 1985.

Acts passed since 1963 are cited by calendar year, as opposed to the convention used for earlier acts of citing the regnal year(s) in which the relevant parliamentary session was held. Each act passed in a respective year is given a chapter number (abbreviated "c."), denoted by Arabic numerals in the case of public general acts, lowercase Roman numerals in the case of local acts, or italicised Arabic numerals in the case of personal acts. These run as separate series.

125 acts of Parliament were passed in 1985: 76 public general acts, 48 local acts and 1 personal act.

indicates that an act has been transcribed on Wikisource, indicates that an act is available to view at legislation.gov.uk, and indicates the location of the original act in the Parliamentary Archives.

== Public general acts ==
Short title	Citation	Royal assent
Long title
Consolidated Fund Act 1985	1985 c. 1	24 January 1985
An Act to apply a sum out of the Consolidated Fund to the service of the year ending on 31st March 1985.
Elections (Northern Ireland) Act 1985	1985 c. 2	24 January 1985
An Act to make further provision for preventing personation at elections in Northern Ireland.
Brunei and Maldives Act 1985	1985 c. 3	11 March 1985
An Act to make provision in connection with the admission of Brunei and Maldives to membership of the Commonwealth.
Milk (Cessation of Production) Act 1985 (repealed)	1985 c. 4	11 March 1985
An Act to provide for payments to be made for the purpose of compensating persons, who are or have been registered in the direct sales register or a wholesale register maintained under the Dairy Produce Quotas Regulations 1984, (Note: Dairy Produce Quotas Regulations 1984 (SI 1984/1047)) for discontinuing or reducing milk production and to make provision in connection with payments to such persons whenever made. (Repealed by Environment, Food and Rural Affairs (Miscellaneous Amendments and Revocations) (Scotland) Regulations 2018 (SSI 2018/391))
New Towns and Urban Development Corporations Act 1985	1985 c. 5	11 March 1985
An Act to make provision with respect to certain matters connected with new towns; to amend paragraph 8(1) of Schedule 31 to the Local Government, Planning and Land Act 1980; (Note: Local Government, Planning and Land Act 1980 (c. 65)) and for connected purposes.
Companies Act 1985	1985 c. 6	11 March 1985
An Act to consolidate the greater part of the Companies Acts.
Business Names Act 1985 (repealed)	1985 c. 7	11 March 1985
An Act to consolidate certain enactments relating to the names under which persons may carry on business in Great Britain. (Repealed by Companies Act 2006 (c. 46))
Company Securities (Insider Dealing) Act 1985 (repealed)	1985 c. 8	11 March 1985
An Act to consolidate the enactments relating to insider dealing in company securities. (Repealed by Criminal Justice Act 1993 (c. 36))
Companies Consolidation (Consequential Provisions) Act 1985 (repealed)	1985 c. 9	11 March 1985
An Act to make, in connection with the consolidation of the Companies Acts 1948 to 1983 and other enactments relating to companies, provision for transitional matters and savings, repeals (including the repeal, in accordance with recommendations of the Law Commission, of certain provisions of the Companies Act 1948 (Note: Companies Act 1948 (11 & 12 Geo. 6. c. 38)) which are no longer of practical utility) and consequential amendments of other Acts. (Repealed by Companies Act 2006 (Consequential Amendments and Transitional Provisions) Order 2011 (SI 2011/1265))
London Regional Transport (Amendment) Act 1985 (repealed)	1985 c. 10	11 March 1985
An Act to specify as £258,179,588 the amount which the Greater London Council are to pay to London Regional Transport under section 49 of the London Regional Transport Act 1984. (Note: London Regional Transport Act 1984 (c. 32)) (Repealed by Statute Law (Repeals) Act 2008 (c. 12))
Consolidated Fund (No. 2) Act 1985	1985 c. 11	27 March 1985
An Act to apply certain sums out of the Consolidated Fund to the service of the years ending on 31st March 1984 and 1985.
Mineral Workings Act 1985	1985 c. 12	27 March 1985
An Act to repeal certain provisions of the Mineral Workings Acts 1951 (Note: Mineral Workings Act 1951 (14 & 15 Geo. 6. c. 60)) and 1971, (Note: Mineral Workings Act 1971 (c. 71)) to transfer the assets of the Ironstone Restoration Fund to the British Steel Corporation, to make further provision about agricultural ironstone land and forestry on ironstone land, to confer powers in connection with the reclamation, improvement or bringing into use of certain land, and for connected purposes.
Cinemas Act 1985	1985 c. 13	27 March 1985
An Act to consolidate the Cinematograph Acts 1909 to 1982 and certain related enactments, with an amendment to give effect to a recommendation of the Law Commission.
Shipbuilding Act 1985 (repealed)	1985 c. 14	27 March 1985
An Act to extend the period in relation to which schemes under the Shipbuilding (Redundancy Payments) Act 1978 (Note: Shipbuilding (Redundancy Payments) Act 1978 (c. 11)) have effect and to extinguish all outstanding liabilities in respect of the loan made to Upper Clyde Shipbuilders Limited by the Shipbuilding Industry Board. (Repealed by Statute Law (Repeals) Act 1993 (c. 50))
Hong Kong Act 1985	1985 c. 15	4 April 1985
An Act to make provision for and in connection with the ending of British sovereignty and jurisdiction over Hong Kong.
National Heritage (Scotland) Act 1985	1985 c. 16	4 April 1985
An Act to transfer responsibility for the Royal Scottish Museum and the National Museum of Antiquities of Scotland to a new Board of Trustees of the National Museums of Scotland, to establish a Board of Trustees of the Royal Botanic Garden, Edinburgh, to make provision as to the status, functions and powers of the new Boards, and as to the property to be held by them, to make further provision as to the Boards of Trustees of the National Galleries of Scotland and the National Library of Scotland, to confer on the Secretary of State power to make grants for cultural and scientific purposes, to amend the Public Records (Scotland) Act 1937 (Note: Public Records (Scotland) Act 1937 (1 Edw. 8 & 1 Geo. 6. c. 43)) and the Historic Buildings and Ancient Monuments Act 1953 (Note: Historic Buildings and Ancient Monuments Act 1953 (1 & 2 Eliz. 2. c. 49)) and for connected purposes.
Reserve Forces (Safeguard of Employment) Act 1985	1985 c. 17	9 May 1985
An Act to consolidate certain enactments as to the reinstatement in civil employment of members of the reserve and auxiliary forces who have been called into whole-time service in the armed forces of the Crown, and for the protection of the employment of those liable to be called into such service.
Betting, Gaming and Lotteries (Amendment) Act 1985 (repealed)	1985 c. 18	9 May 1985
An Act to remove restrictions under the Betting, Gaming and Lotteries Acts 1963 to 1984 as to the occasions on which betting may take place on racecourses and other tracks and as to the events in connection with which betting may take place on dog racecourses; and to make further provision with respect to the operation of totalisators on such racecourses. (Repealed by Gambling Act 2005 (c. 19))
Town and Country Planning (Compensation) Act 1985 (repealed)	1985 c. 19	9 May 1985
An Act to restrict the circumstances in which compensation is payable under sections 165 and 169 of the Town and Country Planning Act 1971 (Note: Town and Country Planning Act 1971 (c. 78)) and sections 154 and 158 of the Town and Country Planning (Scotland) Act 1972. (Note: Town and Country Planning (Scotland) Act 1972 (c. 52)) (Repealed by Planning (Consequential Provisions) (Scotland) Act 1997 (c. 11))
Charities Act 1985 (repealed)	1985 c. 20	23 May 1985
An Act to make further provision with respect to charities in England and Wales. (Repealed by Charities Act 1992 (c. 41))
Films Act 1985	1985 c. 21	23 May 1985
An Act to repeal the Films Acts 1960 to 1980; to make further provision with respect to the financing of films; and for connected purposes.
Dangerous Vessels Act 1985	1985 c. 22	23 May 1985
An Act to empower harbour masters to give directions to prohibit vessels from entering the areas of jurisdiction of their respective harbour authorities or to require the removal of vessels from those areas where those vessels present a grave and imminent danger to the safety of any person or property, or risk of obstruction to navigation; to enable the Secretary of State to give further directions countermanding those first-mentioned directions; and for connected purposes.
Prosecution of Offences Act 1985	1985 c. 23	23 May 1985
An Act to provide for the establishment of a Crown Prosecution Service for England and Wales; to make provision as to costs in criminal cases; to provide for the imposition of time limits in relation to preliminary stages of criminal proceedings; to amend section 42 of the Senior Courts Act 1981 (Note: Senior Courts Act 1981 (c. 54)) (Note: The reference to the Senior Courts Act 1981 was originally to the Supreme Court Act 1981, but that act was renamed by the Constitutional Reform Act 2005 (c. 4) on 1 October 2009 (along with consequential amendments to this act).) and section 3 of the Children and Young Persons Act 1969; (Note: Children and Young Persons Act 1969 (c. 54)) to make provision with respect to consents to prosecutions; to repeal section 9 of the Perjury Act 1911; (Note: Perjury Act 1911 (1 & 2 Geo. 5. c. 6)) and for connected purposes.
Rent (Amendment) Act 1985	1985 c. 24	23 May 1985
An Act to make further provision as to the circumstances in which possession of a dwelling-house is recoverable under Case 11 in Schedule 15 to the Rent Act 1977 (Note: Rent Act 1977 (c. 42)) and Case 11 in Schedule 2 to the Rent (Scotland) Act 1984 (Note: Rent (Scotland) Act 1984 (c. 58)) and as to the parliamentary procedure applicable to an Order in Council under paragraph 1(1) of Schedule 1 to the Northern Ireland Act 1974 (Note: Northern Ireland Act 1974 (c. 28)) which states that it is made for corresponding purposes.
Industrial Development Act 1985	1985 c. 25	13 June 1985
An Act to make provision with respect to the English Industrial Estates Corporation and to extend the borrowing powers of the Welsh Development Agency.
Intoxicating Substances (Supply) Act 1985 (repealed)	1985 c. 26	13 June 1985
An Act to prohibit the supply to persons under the age of eighteen of certain substances which may cause intoxication if inhaled. (Repealed by Psychoactive Substances Act 2016 (c. 2))
Coal Industry Act 1985	1985 c. 27	13 June 1985
An Act to make new provision for grants by the Secretary of State to the National Coal Board in respect of group deficits and further provision with respect to certain grants and payments by the Secretary of State under the Coal Industry Act 1977. (Note: Coal Industry Act 1977 (c. 39))
Motor-Cycle Crash-Helmets (Restriction of Liability) Act 1985 (repealed)	1985 c. 28	13 June 1985
An Act to exempt persons other than the actual offender from criminal liability in respect of the offence of driving or riding on a motor cycle in contravention of regulations requiring the wearing of crash-helmets. (Repealed by Road Traffic (Consequential Provisions) Act 1988 (c. 54))
Enduring Powers of Attorney Act 1985 (repealed)	1985 c. 29	26 June 1985
An Act to enable powers of attorney to be created which will survive any subsequent mental incapacity of the donor and to make provision in connection with such powers. (Repealed by Mental Capacity Act 2005 (c. 9))
Ports (Finance) Act 1985	1985 c. 30	26 June 1985
An Act to provide for grants to be made to the National Dock Labour Board; to increase the limit on the amount of financial assistance to the Port of London Authority and the Mersey Docks and Harbour Company; to make further provision relating to borrowing by and the audit of the accounts of certain harbour authorities; and to repeal section 9 of the Harbours Act 1964. (Note: Harbours Act 1964 (c. 40))
Wildlife and Countryside (Amendment) Act 1985	1985 c. 31	26 June 1985
An Act to amend sections 28 and 43 of the Wildlife and Countryside Act 1981, (Note: Wildlife and Countryside Act 1981 (c. 69)) sections 1 and 2 of the Badgers Act 1973 (Note: Badgers Act 1973 (c. 57)) and section 1 of the Forestry Act 1967. (Note: Forestry Act 1967 (c. 10))
Hill Farming Act 1985	1985 c. 32	26 June 1985
An Act to extend provision made in section 20 of the Hill Farming Act 1946 (Note: Hill Farming Act 1946 (9 & 10 Geo. 6. c. 73)) for regulating or prohibiting the burning of heather and grass so as to include bracken, gorse and vaccinium.
Rating (Revaluation Rebates) (Scotland) Act 1985	1985 c. 33	26 June 1985
An Act to provide, as respects Scotland, for rebates in respect of rates on certain lands and heritages.
Road Traffic (Production of Documents) Act 1985 (repealed)	1985 c. 34	16 July 1985
An Act to amend certain provisions relating to the production of documents under the Road Traffic Act 1972 (Note: Road Traffic Act 1972 (c. 20)) and the Transport Act 1982. (Note: Transport Act 1982 (c. 49)) (Repealed by Road Traffic (Consequential Provisions) Act 1988 (c. 54))
Gaming (Bingo) Act 1985 (repealed)	1985 c. 35	16 July 1985
An Act to amend the Gaming Act 1968 (Note: Gaming Act 1968 (c. 65)) in respect of games which are played on bingo club premises and in which the players may be on different bingo club premises. (Repealed by Gambling Act 2005 (c. 19))
Agricultural Training Board Act 1985 (repealed)	1985 c. 36	16 July 1985
An Act to make provision with respect to the functions of the Agricultural Training Board. (Repealed by Statute Law (Repeals) Act 2004 (c. 14))
Family Law (Scotland) Act 1985	1985 c. 37	16 July 1985
An Act to make fresh provision in the law of Scotland regarding aliment; regarding financial and other consequences of decrees of divorce and of declarator of nullity of marriage; regarding property rights and legal capacity of married persons; and for connected purposes.
Prohibition of Female Circumcision Act 1985 (repealed)	1985 c. 38	16 July 1985
An Act to prohibit female circumcision. (Repealed by Prohibition of Female Genital Mutilation (Scotland) Act 2005 (asp 8))
Controlled Drugs (Penalties) Act 1985	1985 c. 39	16 July 1985
An Act to increase the penalties for certain offences relating to controlled drugs within the meaning of the Misuse of Drugs Act 1971. (Note: Misuse of Drugs Act 1971 (c. 38))
Licensing (Amendment) Act 1985 (repealed)	1985 c. 40	16 July 1985
An Act to amend the Licensing Act 1964 (Note: Licensing Act 1964 (c. 26)) in relation to orders for extended hours at premises providing entertainment and in relation to special hours certificates. (Repealed by Licensing Act 2003 (c. 17))
Copyright (Computer Software) Amendment Act 1985 (repealed)	1985 c. 41	16 July 1985
An Act to amend the Copyright Act 1956 (Note: Copyright Act 1956 (4 & 5 Eliz. 2. c. 74)) in its application to computer programs and computer storage. (Repealed by Copyright, Designs and Patents Act 1988 (c. 48))
Hospital Complaints Procedure Act 1985	1985 c. 42	16 July 1985
An Act to oblige health authorities in England and Wales and Health Boards in Scotland to establish a complaints procedure for hospital patients and to draw such a procedure to the attention of patients.
Local Government (Access to Information) Act 1985	1985 c. 43	16 July 1985
An Act to provide for greater public access to local authority meetings, reports and documents subject to specified confidentiality provisions; to give local authorities duties to publish certain information; and for related purposes.
Sexual Offences Act 1985 (repealed)	1985 c. 44	16 July 1985
An Act to make, as respects England and Wales, provision for penalising in certain circumstances the soliciting of women for sexual purposes by men, and to increase the penalties under the Sexual Offences Act 1956 (Note: Sexual Offences Act 1956 (4 & 5 Eliz. 2. c. 69)) for certain offences against women. (Repealed by Policing and Crime Act 2009 (c. 26))
Charter Trustees Act 1985	1985 c. 45	16 July 1985
An Act to provide for the continuation of the charter trustees of any city or town and for the preservation of their powers and of the privileges and rights of the inhabitants of their area upon that area becoming comprised in a borough.
Insurance (Fees) Act 1985 (repealed)	1985 c. 46	16 July 1985
An Act to provide for the payment of certain fees by insurance companies and the Council of Lloyd's. (Repealed by Financial Services and Markets Act 2000 (Consequential Amendments) Order 2002 (SI 2002/1555))
Further Education Act 1985	1985 c. 47	16 July 1985
An Act to empower local education authorities to supply goods and services through further education establishments and to make loans to certain other persons to enable them to do so; to repeal section 28(b) of the Sex Discrimination Act 1975; (Note: Sex Discrimination Act 1975 (c. 65)) and for connected purposes.
Food and Environment Protection Act 1985	1985 c. 48	16 July 1985
An Act to authorise the making in an emergency of orders specifying activities which are to be prohibited as a precaution against the consumption of food rendered unsuitable for human consumption in consequence of an escape of substances; to replace the Dumping at Sea Act 1974 (Note: Dumping at Sea Act 1974 (c. 20)) with fresh provision for controlling the deposit of substances and articles in the sea; to make provision for the control of the deposit of substances and articles under the sea-bed; to regulate pesticides and substances, preparations and organisms prepared or used for the control of pests or for protection against pests; and for connected purposes.
Surrogacy Arrangements Act 1985	1985 c. 49	16 July 1985
An Act to regulate certain activities in connection with arrangements made with a view to women carrying children as surrogate mothers.
Representation of the People Act 1985	1985 c. 50	16 July 1985
An Act to amend the law relating to parliamentary elections in the United Kingdom and local government elections in Great Britain, to provide for combining polls taken on the same date at such elections and elections to the Assembly of the European Communities, to extend the franchise at elections to that Assembly, to amend the law relating to the effect of the demise of the Crown on the summoning and duration of a new Parliament and to repeal section 21(3) of the Representation of the People Act 1918. (Note: Representation of the People Act 1918 (7 & 8 Geo. 5. c. 64))
Local Government Act 1985	1985 c. 51	16 July 1985
An Act to abolish the Greater London Council and the metropolitan county councils; to transfer their functions to the local authorities in their areas and, in some cases, to other bodies; and to provide for other matters consequential on, or connected with, the abolition of those councils.
Town and Country Planning (Amendment) Act 1985 (repealed)	1985 c. 52	22 July 1985
An Act to extend section 62 of the Town and Country Planning Act 1971 and section 60 of the Town and Country Planning (Scotland) Act 1972 to trees in woodlands. (Repealed by Planning (Consequential Provisions) (Scotland) Act 1997 (c. 11))
Social Security Act 1985	1985 c. 53	22 July 1985
An Act to amend the law relating to occupational pensions, social security and statutory sick pay; to empower the Secretary of State to amend section 1 of the Vaccine Damage Payments Act 1979 (Note: Vaccine Damage Payments Act 1979 (c. 17)) and extend the Pneumoconiosis etc. (Workers' Compensation) Act 1979; (Note: Pneumoconiosis etc. (Workers' Compensation) Act 1979 (c. 41)) to make provision for pensions and gratuities for members of the Horserace Totalisator Board, the Horserace Betting Levy Board and the Gaming Board for Great Britain; and for connected purposes.
Finance Act 1985	1985 c. 54	25 July 1985
An Act to grant certain duties, to alter other duties, and to amend the law relating to the National Debt and the Public Revenue, and to make further provision in connection with Finance.
Appropriation Act 1985	1985 c. 55	25 July 1985
An Act to apply a sum out of the Consolidated Fund to the service of the year ending on 31st March 1986, to appropriate the supplies granted in this Session of Parliament, and to repeal certain Consolidated Fund and Appropriation Acts.
Interception of Communications Act 1985 (repealed)	1985 c. 56	25 July 1985
An Act to make new provision for and in connection with the interception of communications sent by post or by means of public telecommunication systems and to amend section 45 of the Telecommunications Act 1984. (Note: Telecommunications Act 1984 (c. 12)) (Repealed by Regulation of Investigatory Powers Act 2000 (c. 23))
Sporting Events (Control of Alcohol etc.) Act 1985	1985 c. 57	25 July 1985
An Act to make provision for punishing those who cause or permit intoxicating liquor to be carried on public service vehicles and railway passenger vehicles carrying passengers to or from designated sporting events or who possess intoxicating liquor on such vehicles and those who possess intoxicating liquor or certain articles capable of causing injury at designated sports grounds during the period of designated sporting events, for punishing drunkenness on such vehicles and, during the period of designated sporting events, at such grounds and, where licensed premises or premises in respect of which a club is registered (for the purposes of the Licensing Act 1964) are within designated sports grounds, to make provision for regulating the sale or supply of intoxicating liquor and for the closure of bars.
Trustee Savings Banks Act 1985	1985 c. 58	25 July 1985
An Act to make provision for the purposes of or in connection with the reorganisation into companies incorporated under the Companies Acts of the institutions regulated by or existing under the Trustee Savings Banks Act 1981 (Note: Trustee Savings Banks Act 1981 (c. 65)) and for the treatment for the purposes of the Banking Act 1979 (Note: Banking Act 1979 (c. 37)) of any Scottish savings bank established before 28th July 1863 which has not since become a trustee savings bank.
Wildlife and Countryside (Service of Notices) Act 1985	1985 c. 59	25 July 1985
An Act to apply section 283 of the Town and Country Planning Act 1971 and section 269 of the Town and Country Planning (Scotland) Act 1972 to notices and other documents required or authorised to be served or given under the Wildlife and Countryside Act 1981.
Child Abduction and Custody Act 1985	1985 c. 60	25 July 1985
An Act to enable the United Kingdom to ratify two international Conventions relating respectively to the civil aspects of international child abduction and to the recognition and enforcement of custody decisions.
Administration of Justice Act 1985	1985 c. 61	30 October 1985
An Act to make further provision with respect to the administration of justice and matters connected therewith; to amend the Solicitors Act 1974; (Note: Solicitors Act 1974 (c. 47)) to regulate the provision of solicitors' services in the case of incorporated practices; to regulate the provision of conveyancing services by persons practising as licensed conveyancers; to make further provision with respect to complaints relating to the provision of legal aid services; to amend the law relating to time limits for actions for libel and slander; and to make further provision with respect to arbitrations and proceedings in connection with European patents.
Oil and Pipelines Act 1985	1985 c. 62	30 October 1985
An Act to provide for the establishment and functions of a body corporate to be called the Oil and Pipelines Agency, for the vesting in that Agency of the property, rights and liabilities of the British National Oil Corporation and for the subsequent dissolution of that Corporation.
Water (Fluoridation) Act 1985	1985 c. 63	30 October 1985
An Act to make provision with respect to the fluoridation of water supplies.
European Communities (Finance) Act 1985	1985 c. 64	30 October 1985
An Act to amend the definition of "the Treaties" and "the Community Treaties" in section 1(2) of the European Communities Act 1972 (Note: European Communities Act 1972 (c. 68)) so as to include the decision, of 7th May 1985, of the Council of the Communities on the Communities' system of own resources and the undertaking made by the Representatives of the Governments of the member States, meeting within the Council on 23rd and 24th April 1985 in Brussels, to make payments to finance the Communities' general budget for the financial year 1985.
Insolvency Act 1985	1985 c. 65	30 October 1985
An Act to make provision with respect to the insolvency of companies and individuals, the winding up of companies, the disqualification and personal liability of persons involved in the management of companies and the avoidance of certain transactions at an undervalue; and for connected purposes.
Bankruptcy (Scotland) Act 1985 (repealed)	1985 c. 66	30 October 1985
An Act to reform the law of Scotland relating to sequestration and personal insolvency; and for connected purposes. (Repealed by Bankruptcy (Scotland) Act 2016 (asp 21))
Transport Act 1985	1985 c. 67	30 October 1985
An Act to amend the law relating to road passenger transport; to make provision for the transfer of the operations of the National Bus Company to the private sector; to provide for the reorganisation of passenger transport in the public sector; to provide for local and central government financial support for certain passenger transport services and travel concessions; to make further provision with respect to the powers of London Regional Transport; to make new provision with respect to the constitution, powers and proceedings of the Transport Tribunal; to make provision with respect to grants payable under section 92 of the Finance Act 1965; (Note: Finance Act 1965 (c. 25)) to establish a Disabled Persons Transport Advisory Committee; and for connected purposes.
Housing Act 1985	1985 c. 68	30 October 1985
An Act to consolidate the Housing Acts (except those provisions consolidated in the Housing Associations Act 1985 (Note: Housing Associations Act 1985 (c. 69)) and the Landlord and Tenant Act 1985 (Note: Landlord and Tenant Act 1985 (c. 70))), and certain related provisions, with amendments to give effect to recommendations of the Law Commission.
Housing Associations Act 1985	1985 c. 69	30 October 1985
An Act to consolidate certain provisions of the Housing Acts relating to housing associations, with amendments to give effect to recommendations of the Law Commission and of the Scottish Law Commission.
Landlord and Tenant Act 1985	1985 c. 70	30 October 1985
An Act to consolidate certain provisions of the law of landlord and tenant formerly found in the Housing Acts, together with the Landlord and Tenant Act 1962, (Note: Landlord and Tenant Act 1962 (10 & 11 Eliz. 2. c. 50)) with amendments to give effect to recommendations of the Law Commission.
Housing (Consequential Provisions) Act 1985	1985 c. 71	30 October 1985
An Act to make provision for repeals, consequential amendments, transitional matters and savings in connection with the consolidation of enactments in the Housing Act 1985, (Note: Housing Act 1985 (c. 68)) the Housing Associations Act 1985 and the Landlord and Tenant Act 1985.
Weights and Measures Act 1985	1985 c. 72	30 October 1985
An Act to consolidate certain enactments relating to weights and measures.
Law Reform (Miscellaneous Provisions) (Scotland) Act 1985	1985 c. 73	30 October 1985
An Act to amend the law of Scotland in respect of certain leases, other contracts and obligations; certain courts and their powers; evidence and procedure; certain criminal penalties; the care of children; the functions of the Commissioner for Local Administration; solicitors; and certain procedures relating to crofting and the valuation of sheep stocks; and to make, as respects Scotland, certain other miscellaneous reforms of the law.
Consolidated Fund (No. 3) Act 1985	1985 c. 74	19 December 1985
An Act to apply certain sums out of the Consolidated Fund to the service of the years ending on 31st March 1986 and 1987.
European Communities (Spanish and Portuguese Accession) Act 1985 (repealed)	1985 c. 75	19 December 1985
An Act to extend the meaning in Acts, Measures and subordinate legislation of "the Treaties" and "the Community Treaties" in connection with the accession of the Kingdom of Spain and the Portuguese Republic to the European Communities. (Repealed by European Union (Withdrawal) Act 2018 (Consequential Modifications and Repeals and Revocations) (EU Exit) Regulations 2019 (SI 2019/628))
Northern Ireland (Loans) Act 1985 (repealed)	1985 c. 76	19 December 1985
An Act to increase the limit imposed by section 1 of the Northern Ireland (Loans) Act 1975. (Note: Northern Ireland (Loans) Act 1975 (c. 83)) (Repealed by Northern Ireland (Miscellaneous Provisions) Act 2006 (c. 33))

== Local acts ==
Short title	Citation	Royal assent
Long title
London Transport (Tower Hill) Act 1985	1985 c. i	24 January 1985
An Act to empower London Regional Transport to construct works and to acquire lands; to confer further powers on London Regional Transport; and for other purposes.
Highland Region (Kinlochbervie) Order Confirmation Act 1985	1985 c. ii	11 March 1985
An Act to confirm a Provisional Order under the Private Legislation Procedure (Scotland) Act 1936, (Note: Private Legislation Procedure (Scotland) Act 1936 (26 Geo. 5 & 1 Edw. 8. c. 52)) relating to Highland Region (Kinlochbervie).
	Highland Region (Kinlochbervie) Order 1985 Provisional Order to confer powers on the Highland Regional Council with respect to their pier at Loch Clash and their harbour at Loch Bervie; to authorise the construction of works; to provide for new harbour limits within which the Council shall have jurisdiction; and for other purposes.	
Surrey Act 1985	1985 c. iii	27 March 1985
An Act to re-enact with amendments and to extend certain local enactments in force within the county of Surrey; to confer further powers on the Surrey County Council and local authorities in the county; to make further provision in regard to the environment, local government, improvement and finances of the county and those local authorities; and for other purposes.
Lerwick Harbour Order Confirmation Act 1985	1985 c. iv	4 April 1985
An Act to confirm a Provisional Order under the Private Legislation Procedure (Scotland) Act 1936, relating to Lerwick Harbour.
	Lerwick Harbour Order 1985 Provisional Order to confer powers on the Trustees of the port and harbour of Lerwick as to lands; to authorise the Trustees to construct new works for the improvement of the harbour and the facilities thereat; to make provision with respect to dangerous goods; to confer powers on the Trustees and the harbour master to give directions to vessels in the port and harbour; to provide for an increase in the Trustees' powers to borrow money; and for other purposes.	
Bournemouth Borough Council Act 1985	1985 c. v	4 April 1985
An Act to re-enact with amendments certain local enactments in force within the borough of Bournemouth; to confer further powers on the Bournemouth Borough Council; and for other purposes.
London Docklands Railway Act 1985	1985 c. vi	4 April 1985
An Act to empower London Regional Transport to construct works and to acquire lands; to confer further powers on London Regional Transport; and for other purposes.
Gosport Borough Council Act 1985	1985 c. vii	9 May 1985
An Act to provide for the further alteration of the public passenger transport routes prescribed by the Gosport and Fareham Omnibus Services Act 1929; (Note: Gosport and Fareham Omnibus Services Act 1929 (19 & 20 Geo. 5. c. lxv)) and for other purposes.
National Bank of New Zealand Limited Act 1985	1985 c. viii	9 May 1985
An Act to provide for the cesser of incorporation in England of The National Bank of New Zealand, Limited.
Lloyds Bank (Merger) Act 1985	1985 c. ix	9 May 1985
An Act to provide for the vesting in Lloyds Bank Plc of the undertaking of Lloyds Bank International Limited; and for other purposes.
Glensanda Harbour Order Confirmation Act 1985	1985 c. x	23 May 1985
An Act to confirm a Provisional Order under the Private Legislation Procedure (Scotland) Act 1936, relating to Glensanda Harbour.
	Glensanda Harbour Order 1985 Provisional Order to empower Foster Yeoman Limited to construct works at Glensanda in the district of Lochaber in the Highland Region and to exercise harbour jurisdiction in the area adjoining such works; and for other purposes.	
Luton Borough Council Act 1985	1985 c. xi	13 June 1985
An Act to re-enact with amendments certain local enactments in force within the borough of Luton; and for other purposes.
Greater Manchester Act 1985	1985 c. xii	13 June 1985
An Act to amend the Shops Act 1950 (Note: Shops Act 1950 (14 Geo. 6. c. 28)) in its application to certain premises in the city of Manchester; to confer further powers upon the Greater Manchester County Council; and for other purposes.
Royal Bank of Scotland Act 1985	1985 c. xiii	13 June 1985
An Act to provide for the transfer of the undertakings of certain subsidiaries of The Royal Bank of Scotland Group public limited company to RBSG public limited company; and for purposes connected therewith.
Bath City Council Act 1985	1985 c. xiv	13 June 1985
An Act to authorise the Bath City Council to appropriate a portion of Royal Victoria Park for the purpose of constructing an access to a parking place for motor vehicles.
Nottinghamshire County Council Act 1985	1985 c. xv	26 June 1985
An Act to re-enact with amendments and to extend certain local statutory provisions in force within the county of Nottinghamshire; to confer further powers on the Nottinghamshire County Council and local authorities in the county; to make further provision with respect to the improvement, health and local government of the county; and for other purposes.
King's College London Act 1985	1985 c. xvi	26 June 1985
An Act to unite The Principal and Governors of Queen Elizabeth College and Chelsea College, University of London with King's College London; to transfer all rights, properties and liabilities from the first two mentioned colleges to King's College London; and for connected and other purposes.
Leicestershire Act 1985	1985 c. xvii	26 June 1985
An Act to re-enact with amendments and to extend certain local enactments in force within the county of Leicestershire; to confer further powers on the Leicestershire County Council and local authorities in the county; to make further provision with regard to the environment, local government, improvement, health and finances of the county; and for other purposes.
Associated British Ports Act 1985	1985 c. xviii	26 June 1985
An Act to empower Associated British Ports to construct works and to acquire lands; to confer further powers on A.B. Ports; and for other purposes.
Nottinghamshire County Council (Superannuation) Act 1985	1985 c. xix	26 June 1985
An Act to make further provision for the administration of the Nottinghamshire County Council Superannuation Fund.
Royal Holloway and Bedford New College Act 1985	1985 c. xx	16 July 1985
An Act to incorporate the Royal Holloway and Bedford New College; to transfer to the Royal Holloway and Bedford New College all rights, properties, assets and liabilities of the Royal Holloway College and Bedford College and to dissolve those colleges; to enact provisions with regard to the Royal Holloway and Bedford New College; and for other purposes.
Streatham Park Cemetery Act 1985	1985 c. xxi	16 July 1985
An Act to authorise The Great Southern Cemetery and Crematorium Company Limited to sell or develop certain lands forming part of Streatham Park Cemetery belonging to the said Company free from restrictions; and for other purposes.
Harrogate Stray Act 1985	1985 c. xxii	16 July 1985
An Act to re-enact with amendments certain local enactments in force within the borough of Harrogate; to confer further powers on the Council of the Borough of Harrogate with respect to the management of the Stray; and for other purposes.
Alexandra Park and Palace Act 1985	1985 c. xxiii	16 July 1985
An Act to amend the Alexandra Park and Palace (Public Purposes) Act 1900, (Note: Alexandra Park and Palace (Public Purposes) Act 1900 (63 & 64 Vict. c. cclix)) the Alexandra Park and Palace Act 1913 (Note: Alexandra Park and Palace Act 1913 (3 & 4 Geo. 5. c. cxi)) and the Alexandra Park and Palace Order 1966; (Note: Alexandra Park and Palace Order 1966 (SI 1966/199)) to confer powers on the Council of the London Borough of Haringey as trustees with respect to the Alexandra Park and Palace; and for other purposes.
C-Poultry Company Limited Act 1985	1985 c. xxiv	16 July 1985
An Act to make provision for the transfer to the State of Delaware in the United States of America of the incorporation of C-Poultry Company Limited; for the cesser of application to that company of provisions of the Companies Act 1985; (Note: Companies Act 1985 (c. 6)) and for purposes incidental thereto.
Plymouth Marine Events Base Act 1985	1985 c. xxv	16 July 1985
An Act to authorise the council of the city of Plymouth and Dean and Dyball (Plymouth) Limited to construct works in the Cattewater at Plymouth; to constitute a pier authority; and for other purposes.
Greater London Council (Money) Act 1985	1985 c. xxvi	16 July 1985
An Act to regulate prescribed expenditure and expenditure on lending to other persons by the Greater London Council during the financial period from 1st April 1985 to 30th September 1986; and for other purposes.
Shetland Islands Council (Omnibus Services) Order Confirmation Act 1985	1985 c. xxvii	22 July 1985
An Act to confirm a Provisional Order under the Private Legislation Procedure (Scotland) Act 1936, relating to Shetland Islands Council (Omnibus Services).
	Shetland Islands Council (Omnibus Services) Order 1985 Provisional Order to empower the Shetland Islands Council to operate an omnibus undertaking.	
Scarborough Borough Council Act 1985	1985 c. xxviii	22 July 1985
An Act to empower The Scarborough Borough Council to maintain and work a cliff lift undertaking at Whitby and to maintain and work a cliff railway undertaking at Scarborough; and for other purposes.
Durham City Council Act 1985	1985 c. xxix	22 July 1985
An Act to re-enact with amendments certain local enactments in force in the city of Durham; to empower the Durham City Council to acquire land or rights therein or thereover for altering, adding to and extending the town hall in that city; to make further provision with regard to the freedom of that city; and for other purposes.
British Railways (Trowse Bridge) Act 1985	1985 c. xxx	22 July 1985
An Act to empower the British Railways Board to construct works and to purchase or use land in the city of Norwich, in the county of Norfolk; to confer further powers on the Board; and for other purposes.
East Lothian District Council (Musselburgh Links, etc.) Order Confirmation Act 1985	1985 c. xxxi	25 July 1985
An Act to confirm a Provisional Order under the Private Legislation Procedure (Scotland) Act 1936, relating to East Lothian District Council (Musselburgh Links, etc.).
	East Lothian District Council (Musselburgh Links, etc.) Order 1985 Provisional Order to repeal and to re-enact with amendments certain provisions relating to the administration and regulation of Musselburgh Links and other burgh lands adjoining Musselburgh Links; to make further provision for the administration, regulation and control of Musselburgh Links and those lands; to put beyond doubt the extent of an interdict affecting Musselburgh Links; and for other purposes.	
Shetland Islands Council Order Confirmation Act 1985	1985 c. xxxii	25 July 1985
An Act to confirm a Provisional Order under the Private Legislation Procedure (Scotland) Act 1936, relating to Shetland Islands Council.
	Shetland Islands Council Order 1985 Provisional Order to extend the provisions of the Zetland County Council Act 1974 (Note: Zetland County Council Act 1974 (c. viii)) to certain areas in the Shetland Islands Area; to repeal enactments relating to piers and harbours in the said Area; and for other purposes.	
Hastings Pier Act 1985	1985 c. xxxiii	25 July 1985
An Act to repeal, and re-enact with amendments, the Hastings Pier Acts and Orders 1867 to 1960; (Note: Hastings Pier Act 1867 (30 & 31 Vict. c. clxxxvii)) (Note: Hastings Pier Act 1960 (c. xxxviii)) and to make further provision with respect to the Hastings Pier Company; and for other purposes.
Oxfordshire Act 1985	1985 c. xxxiv	25 July 1985
An Act to re-enact with amendments and extend certain local statutory provisions in force within the county of Oxfordshire; to confer further powers on the Oxfordshire County Council and local authorities and parish councils in the county; to make further provision with respect to the improvement, health and local government of the county; and for other purposes.
Associated British Ports (Port of Ayr) Order Confirmation Act 1985	1985 c. xxxv	30 October 1985
An Act to confirm a Provisional Order under the Private Legislation Procedure (Scotland) Act 1936, relating to Associated British Ports (Port of Ayr).
	Associated British Ports (Port of Ayr) Order 1985 Provisional Order to empower Associated British Ports to construct works and acquire lands at the port of Ayr; to confer further powers on A.B. Ports; and for other purposes.	
Church of Scotland Trust (Amendment) Order Confirmation Act 1985 (repealed)	1985 c. xxxvi	30 October 1985
An Act to confirm a Provisional Order under the Private Legislation Procedure (Scotland) Act 1936, relating to Church of Scotland Trust (Amendment). (Repealed by Statute Law (Repeals) Act 1998 (c. 43))
	Church of Scotland Trust (Amendment) Order 1985 Provisional Order to extend the powers of the Church of Scotland Trust with respect to the investment of the funds belonging to or held by it, and for other purposes.	
Dartmoor Commons Act 1985	1985 c. xxxvii	30 October 1985
An Act to constitute the Dartmoor Commoners' Council for the maintenance of and the promotion of proper standards of livestock husbandry on the commons in and about the Dartmoor National Park; to regulate public access to the commons; to confer powers on that Council and on the county council of Devon with reference to those commons; and for connected and other purposes.
Lincoln City Council Act 1985	1985 c. xxxviii	30 October 1985
An Act to re-enact with amendments certain local enactments in force within the city of Lincoln; to make further provision with regard to the Commons and fairs of the city, the seizing of stray horses, the prevention of flooding and for the maintenance of the omnibus undertaking; and for other purposes.
Merseyside Development Corporation Act 1985	1985 c. xxxix	30 October 1985
An Act to empower The Merseyside Development Corporation to make byelaws for the good rule and government of its land; to secure that certain enactments have no application to, or to the Corporation with respect to, land vested in the Corporation; to extinguish certain rights of public navigation; to control or prevent pollution in areas of water vested in the Corporation; and for other purposes.
Cambridge City Council Act 1985	1985 c. xl	30 October 1985
An Act to re-enact with amendments certain local enactments in force within the City of Cambridge; to confer further powers on the Council of the City of Cambridge; and for other purposes.
Birmingham City Council Act 1985	1985 c. xli	30 October 1985
An Act to authorise motor racing on certain streets in the city of Birmingham; to confer powers on the City of Birmingham District Council in relation thereto; and for other purposes.
Hereford City Council Act 1985	1985 c. xlii	30 October 1985
An Act to re-enact with amendments certain local enactments in force within the city of Hereford; to confer further powers on the Council of the city of Hereford; to make provision with regard to the health, local government and improvement of the city; and for other purposes.
Worcester City Council Act 1985	1985 c. xliii	30 October 1985
An Act to re-enact with amendments and to extend certain local enactments in force within the city of Worcester; to confer further powers on the Council of the city of Worcester; to make provision with regard to health, safety and public order within the city, the amenity of the river Severn, local government and improvement of the city; and for other purposes.
Clwyd County Council Act 1985	1985 c. xliv	30 October 1985
An Act to re-enact with amendments and to extend certain local statutory provisions in force within the county of Clwyd; to confer further powers on the local authorities in that county; to make further provision with respect to the improvement, health and local government of the county; and for other purposes.
Fraserburgh Harbour Order Confirmation Act 1985	1985 c. xlv	19 December 1985
An Act to confirm a Provisional Order under the Private Legislation Procedure (Scotland) Act 1936, relating to Fraserburgh Harbour.
	Fraserburgh Harbour Order 1985 Provisional Order to enact new provisions with respect to the constitution of the Fraserburgh Harbour Commissioners; to repeal and to re-enact with amendments the Fraserburgh Harbour Acts 1878 (Note: Fraserburgh Harbour Act 1878 (41 & 42 Vict. c. cii)) to 1975; to extend the limits of Fraserburgh Harbour; to make other provision with reference to Fraserburgh Harbour; and for purposes connected therewith.	
Fraserburgh Harbour (No. 2) Order Confirmation Act 1985 (repealed)	1985 c. xlvi	19 December 1985
An Act to confirm a Provisional Order under the Private Legislation Procedure (Scotland) Act 1936, relating to Fraserburgh Harbour (No. 2). (Repealed by Fraserburgh Harbour Revision (Constitution) Order 2001 (SSI 2001/457))
	Fraserburgh Harbour (No. 2) Order 1985 Provisional Order to authorise the Fraserburgh Harbour Commissioners to carry out works for the improvement of Fraserburgh Harbour and to borrow money; and for other purposes.	
Fraserburgh Harbour (No. 3) Order Confirmation Act 1985 (repealed)	1985 c. xlvii	19 December 1985
An Act to confirm a Provisional Order under the Private Legislation Procedure (Scotland) Act 1936, relating to Fraserburgh Harbour (No. 3). (Repealed by Fraserburgh Harbour Order Confirmation Act 1990 (c. xxxii))
	Fraserburgh Harbour (No. 3) Order 1985 Provisional Order to authorise the Fraserburgh Harbour Commissioners to carry out works for the improvement of Fraserburgh Harbour; and for other purposes.	
Okehampton Bypass (Confirmation of Orders) Act 1985	1985 c. xlviii	19 December 1985
An Act to confirm, for the purposes of the Statutory Orders (Special Procedure) Act 1945, (Note: Statutory Orders (Special Procedure) Act 1945 (9 & 10 Geo. 6. c. 18)) two compulsory purchase orders made by the Secretary of State under the Highways Act 1980 (Note: Highways Act 1980 (c. 66)) and the Acquisition of Land Act 1981 (Note: Acquisition of Land Act 1981 (c. 67)) for purposes connected with the construction of the Okehampton Bypass.
	Exeter–Launceston–Bodmin Trunk Road (Okehampton Bypass) Compulsory Purchase Order (No. CSW 1) 1984 (Note: Although passed in 1985, the short title specifies the year 1984.)	
	Exeter–Launceston–Bodmin Trunk Road (Okehampton Bypass Supplementary No. 1) Compulsory Purchase Order (No. CSW 2) 1984	

== Private and personal acts ==
Short title	Citation	Royal assent
Long title
Valerie Mary Hill and Alan Monk (Marriage Enabling) Act 1985	1985 c. 1 Pr.	27 March 1985
An Act to enable Valerie Mary Hill and Alan Monk to be married to each other.

== See also ==
- List of acts of the Parliament of the United Kingdom
