= Licensing Act 1988 =

Act of the Parliament of the United Kingdom

Licensing Act 1988 (Note: Section 20(1).)
- Act of Parliament
- Parliament of the United Kingdom
- Long title: An Act to amend the Licensing Act 1964.
- Citation: 1988 c. 17
- Territorial extent: England and Wales (Note: Section 20(4).)

Dates
- Royal assent: 19 May 1988
- Commencement: various (Note: Section 20(3).)
- Repealed: 24 November 2005 (Note: The Licensing Act 2003 (Commencement No. 7 and Transitional Provisions) Order 2005 (SI 2005/3056).)
Other legislation
Amends	Licensing Act 1964
Repeals/revokes	Licensing (Restaurant Meals) Act 1987
Amended by	Licensing (Sunday Hours) Act 1995; Licensing (Young Persons) Act 2000
Repealed by	Licensing Act 2003

Status: Repealed

Text of statute as originally enacted

Revised text of statute as amended

The Licensing Act 1988 (c. 17) was an act of the Parliament of the United Kingdom applying to England and Wales, which among other things, extended permissible opening hours for public houses to 11 am to 11 pm. Previously pubs were not generally allowed to open between 3:00 pm and 5:30 pm.

== Provisions ==
The act amended the Licensing Act 1964, which it calls "the principal Act". Section 1 of the act, on the permitted hours in licensed premises, amended section 60 of the 1964 act so that the weekday hours ended at 11 pm rather than half past ten and the afternoon break of two and a half hours was removed, and shortened the Sunday afternoon break to four hours beginning at three. It made corresponding changes to the permitted hours in clubs and under special hours certificates, and schedule 1 made consequential amendments. Section 2 of the act extended the period for the consumption of intoxicating liquor after the end of the permitted hours from ten minutes to twenty minutes.

Section 3 of the act inserted sections 67A to 67D into the 1964 act, allowing licensing justices (for licensed premises) or a magistrates' court (for clubs) to make a "restriction order" removing from the permitted hours any time between half past two and half past five in the afternoon, for up to twelve months, on the application of the chief officer of police, local residents or businesses, or the head teacher of a nearby educational establishment. The grounds were the avoidance of disturbance or annoyance in the neighbourhood, or of disorderly conduct. Schedule 2 inserted a new schedule 8A on the procedure for restriction orders. Section 4 of the act abolished the renewal of extended hours orders. Section 5 of the act made the grant of a special hours certificate discretionary rather than a duty, and allowed a certificate to be limited to particular times, days or periods of the year.

Section 6 of the act allowed fees to be charged for exemption orders and for certificates of suitability of club premises, and section 7 made a technical amendment to the 1964 act on general orders of exemption in London. Section 8 allowed licensing justices to vary the permitted hours in on-licensed vineyard premises where the sale of liquor was ancillary to the production of wine from grapes grown in the vineyard.

Section 9 of the act allowed a provisional grant of a licence to be declared final before the premises were completed, and section 10 disqualified premises primarily used as a garage from receiving a justices' licence, while preserving existing licences. Section 11 of the act extended the duration of justices' licences and of canteen licences, introducing three-year licensing periods beginning on 5 April 1989. Section 12 allowed licensing justices to revoke justices' licences and canteen licences at any licensing sessions other than those at which renewal fell to be considered, and section 13 allowed the clerk to the licensing justices to grant unopposed renewals.

Section 14 of the act allowed licensing justices to sit in divisions, and raised the maximum size of a licensing committee from fifteen to twenty justices, with power for the Secretary of State to direct a larger number. Section 15 of the act gave the licensing justices power to award costs on applications relating to licensed premises.

Section 16 of the act amended section 169 of the 1964 act on the sale of intoxicating liquor on licensed premises to persons under eighteen, removing the word "knowingly" from the offence in section 169(1) and providing a defence of due diligence. Section 17 of the act dealt with sales to or by persons under eighteen on wholesale premises, and section 18 prohibited unsupervised off-sales by persons under eighteen. Section 19 gave effect to schedule 3 (minor amendments) and schedule 4 (repeals), which repealed the whole of the Licensing (Restaurant Meals) Act 1987 and parts of the 1964 act, the Finance Act 1967, the Criminal Law Act 1977 and the Magistrates' Courts Act 1980. Section 20 of the act provided the short title, brought the act into force on days appointed by the Secretary of State by order, and extended it to England and Wales only.

== Subsequent developments ==
Section 1(2) of the act and paragraphs 1 and 4 of schedule 1 to it were repealed by the Licensing (Sunday Hours) Act 1995, and section 16 and paragraph 17 of schedule 3 were repealed by section 2(4) of, and the schedule to, the Licensing (Young Persons) Act 2000.

The whole act was repealed by section 201(2) of, and schedule 7 to, the Licensing Act 2003, which came into force on 24 November 2005.

== See also ==
- Licensing Act 1872
- Licensing Act 2003
