= Zoo Bar =

Zoo Bar may refer to:

- Zoo Bar (Lincoln, Nebraska), United States, a blues music venue and nightclub
- Zoo Bar (Halifax, West Yorkshire), England, a nightclub
