= Companies Consolidation (Consequential Provisions) Act 1985 =

Act of the Parliament of the United Kingdom

Companies Consolidation (Consequential Provisions) Act 1985 (Note: Section 35.)
- Act of Parliament
- Parliament of the United Kingdom
- Long title: An Act to make, in connection with the consolidation of the Companies Acts 1948 to 1983 and other enactments relating to companies, provision for transitional matters and savings, repeals (including the repeal, in accordance with recommendations of the Law Commission, of certain provisions of the Companies Act 1948 which are no longer of practical utility) and consequential amendments of other Acts.
- Citation: 1985 c. 9
- Territorial extent: England and Wales; Scotland; (Note: Section 33: except so far as it has effect for maintaining the continuity of the law, repeals an enactment extending to Northern Ireland, or amends an enactment extending to Northern Ireland (otherwise than by the insertion of provisions expressed not so to extend), the act does not extend to Northern Ireland.)

Dates
- Royal assent: 11 March 1985
- Commencement: 1 July 1985 (Note: Section 34.)
- Repealed: 12 May 2011

Other legislation
- Amends: See § Repealed enactments
- Repeals/revokes: See § Repealed enactments
- Repealed by: The Companies Act 2006 (Consequential Amendments and Transitional Provisions) Order 2011
- Relates to: Companies Act 1985; Business Names Act 1985; Company Securities (Insider Dealing) Act 1985

Status: Repealed

Text of statute as originally enacted

Revised text of statute as amended

The Companies Consolidation (Consequential Provisions) Act 1985 (c. 9) was an act of the Parliament of the United Kingdom that made transitional provisions and savings, effected repeals (including, on the recommendation of the Law Commission, the repeal of provisions of the Companies Act 1948 (11 & 12 Geo. 6. c. 38) that were no longer of practical use) and made consequential amendments to other enactments, in connection with the 1985 consolidation of the Companies Acts 1948 to 1983 into the Companies Act 1985, the Business Names Act 1985 and the Company Securities (Insider Dealing) Act 1985.

== Provisions ==
=== Repeal of obsolete provisions ===
Section 28, acting on a recommendation of the Law Commission, repealed a number of provisions of the Companies Act 1948 (11 & 12 Geo. 6. c. 38) relating to stannaries and cost-book companies (an old form of mining company peculiar to Cornwall and Devon) that were no longer of practical utility.

==== Repealed enactments ====
Section 29 of the act repealed 32 enactments, listed in schedule 1 to the act.

Citation	Short title	Extent of repeal
1948 c. 38	Companies Act 1948	The whole act.
1952 c. 33	Finance Act 1952	In section 30, subsections (2) and (3); in subsection (5) the words "(2) or (3)"; and in subsection (6) the words from " and subsection (3)" to the end.
1961 c. 46	Companies (Floating Charges) (Scotland) Act 1961	Section 7.
1966 c. 18	Finance Act 1966	In Schedule 6, in paragraph 14, the words " section 319(1)(a)(ii) of the Companies Act 1948 and in ".
1966 c. 29	Singapore Act 1966	In the Schedule, paragraph 14.
1967 c. 81	Companies Act 1967	The whole act, except so much of Part II as remains unrepealed immediately before the commencement of this act.
1970 c. 8	Insolvency Services (Accounting and Investment) Act 1970	In section 1(3), paragraph (c) (with the " and " immediately preceding it).
1972 c. 67	Companies (Floating Charges and Receivers) (Scotland) Act 1972	The whole act.
1972 c. 68	European Communities Act 1972	Section 9.
1973 c. 38	Social Security Act 1973	In Schedule 27, paragraph 9.
1973 c. 48	Pakistan Act 1973	In Schedule 3, paragraph 3(1) and (4).
1973 c. 51	Finance Act 1973	In Schedule 19, paragraph 14.
1974 c. 37	Health and Safety at Work etc. Act 1974	Section 79.
1975 c. 18	Social Security (Consequential Provisions) Act 1975	In Schedule 2, paragraph 7.
1975 c. 45	Finance (No. 2) Act 1975	In Part IV of Schedule 12, paragraph 6(1)(e).
1975 c. 60	Social Security Pensions Act 1975	In Schedule 4, paragraph 3.
1976 c. 47	Stock Exchange (Completion of Bargains) Act 1976	Sections 1 to 4. Section 7(3),
1976 c. 60	Insolvency Act 1976	In section 1(1), the words " the winding up of companies and ". Section 9. Section 14(3). In section 14(6), the word " 9 ". In Part I of Schedule 1, the heading " The Companies Act 1948 " and the entries under that heading; and in Part II of that Schedule in paragraph 1, sub-paragraph (c), in paragraph 2, sub-paragraph (c), paragraph 6, and in paragraph 7, sub-paragraph (b). In Schedule 2, paragraphs 3 and 4.
1976 c. 69	Companies Act 1976	The whole act.
1979 c. 53	Charging Orders Act 1979	In section 4, the words " and in section 325 of the Companies Act 1948", and the words " in each case ".
1980 c. 22	Companies Act 1980	The whole act.
1981 c. 54	Supreme Court Act 1981 (Note: Renamed the Senior Courts Act 1981 with effect from 1 October 2009 by section 59(5) of, and paragraph 1 of schedule 11 to, the Constitutional Reform Act 2005.)	In Schedule 5, the entry relating to the Companies Act 1948.
1981 c. 62	Companies Act 1981	The whole act.
1981 c. 63	Betting and Gaming Duties Act 1981	In section 30(1), the word " or" at the end of paragraph (b), and paragraph (c). In section 30(2), paragraph (c).
1981 c. 65	Trustee Savings Banks Act 1981	In Schedule 6, the entry under " COMPANIES ACT 1948 ".
1982 c. 4	Stock Transfer Act 1982	In Schedule 2, paragraphs 4 and 5.
1982 c. 46	Employment Act 1982	Section 1.
1982 c. 48	Criminal Justice Act 1982	In section 46(4)(a) the words from " except" to " 1981 ".
1982 c. 50	Insurance Companies Act 1982	In Schedule 4, paragraph 14.
1983 c. 50	Companies (Beneficial Interests) Act 1983	The whole act.
1983 c. 53	Car Tax Act 1983	In Schedule 1, in paragraph 4(1), the word " or " at the end of sub-paragraph (b), and sub-paragraph (c); and in that Schedule, in paragraph 4(2), sub-paragraph (c).
1983 c. 55	Value Added Tax Act 1983	In Schedule 7, in paragraph 12(1), the word " or " at the end of sub-paragraph (b), and sub-paragraph (c); and in that Schedule, in paragraph 12(2), sub-paragraph (c).

== Subsequent developments ==
The whole act was repealed by article 2 of the Companies Act 2006 (Consequential Amendments and Transitional Provisions) Order 2011 (SI 2011/1265), which came into force on 12 May 2011, as part of the transition to the Companies Act 2006.
