= Tramshed =

Tramsheds may refer to a tram depot. It may also refer to:

== Entertainment venues ==
- Tramshed, Cardiff, a music and arts venue in Cardiff, Wales
- Tramshed, a side-by-side nightclub to the Zoo Bar (Halifax, West Yorkshire)
- The Tramshed, a theatre, arts and music venue in Woolwich, London
- The Tramshed, part of Swansea Museum (and formerly part of the Maritime and Industrial Museum)

== See also ==
- Rozelle Tram Depot, now called Tramsheds, a food-focused retail venue
