= Company Securities (Insider Dealing) Act 1985 =

Act of the Parliament of the United Kingdom

Company Securities (Insider Dealing) Act 1985 (Note: Section 19.)
- Act of Parliament
- Parliament of the United Kingdom
- Long title: An Act to consolidate the enactments relating to insider dealing in company securities.
- Citation: 1985 c. 8
- Territorial extent: England and Wales; Scotland; (Note: Section 17.)

Dates
- Royal assent: 11 March 1985
- Commencement: 1 July 1985 (Note: Section 18.)
- Repealed: 1 March 1994 (Note: The Criminal Justice Act 1993 (Commencement No. 5) Order 1994 (SI 1994/242).)

Other legislation
- Amends: Companies Act 1980; Companies Act 1981
- Repealed by: Criminal Justice Act 1993
- Relates to: Companies Consolidation (Consequential Provisions) Act 1985

Status: Repealed

Text of statute as originally enacted

The Company Securities (Insider Dealing) Act 1985 (c. 8) was an act of the Parliament of the United Kingdom that consolidated the enactments relating to insider dealing in the securities of companies.

== Subsequent developments ==
The whole act was repealed by section 79(14) of, and part I of schedule 6 to, the Criminal Justice Act 1993, which came into force on 1 March 1994. The act was replaced with a new insider dealing offence under part V of that act, implementing the EC Insider Dealing Directive (89/592/EEC).
