= Controlled Drugs (Penalties) Act 1985 =

Act of the Parliament of the United Kingdom

Controlled Drugs (Penalties) Act 1985 (Note: Section 3(1).)
- Act of Parliament
- Parliament of the United Kingdom
- Long title: An Act to increase the penalties for certain offences relating to controlled drugs within the meaning of the Misuse of Drugs Act 1971.
- Citation: 1985 c. 39
- Territorial extent: United Kingdom

Dates
- Royal assent: 16 July 1985
- Commencement: 16 September 1985 (Note: Section 2(1).)
Other legislation
Amends	Misuse of Drugs Act 1971; Customs and Excise Management Act 1979
Amended by	Statute Law (Repeals) Act 2004

Status: Amended

Text of statute as originally enacted

Revised text of statute as amended

Text of the Controlled Drugs (Penalties) Act 1985 as in force today (including any amendments) within the United Kingdom, from legislation.gov.uk.

The Controlled Drugs (Penalties) Act 1985 (c. 39) is an act of the Parliament of the United Kingdom. It amended the Misuse of Drugs Act 1971 and the Customs and Excise Management Act 1979 to increase the maximum penalty for importing, producing or supplying Class A drugs, or possessing them with intent to supply, from 14 years to life imprisonment.
