= Live Music Act 2012 =

Act of the Parliament of the United Kingdom

Live Music Act 2012 (Note: Section 4(1).)
- Act of Parliament
- Parliament of the United Kingdom
- Long title: An Act to amend the Licensing Act 2003 with respect to the performance of live music entertainment; and for connected purposes.
- Citation: 2012 c. 2
- Introduced by: Donald Michael Ellison Foster (Commons); Lord Clement-Jones (Lords)
- Territorial extent: England and Wales (Note: Section 4(3).)

Dates
- Royal assent: 8 March 2012
- Commencement: 1 October 2012 (Note: Section 4(2). The Live Music Act 2012 (Commencement) Order 2012 (SI 2012/2115).)
Other legislation
Amends	Licensing Act 2003

Status: Current legislation

Text of statute as originally enacted

Text of the Live Music Act 2012 as in force today (including any amendments) within the United Kingdom, from legislation.gov.uk.

The Live Music Act 2012 (c. 2) is an act of the Parliament of the United Kingdom. The act reduces regulation surrounding live music in small venues. The audience limit has now been extended to 500 people.

At the time the act was passed, the industry body, UK Music, estimated that it would enable 13,000 more venues to start to hold live music events.

== Passage ==
The act was passed as a private member's bill.

== Provisions ==
The act allows for licence exemptions for live music between 8am and 11pm to audiences of up to 200.

== Reception ==
The Noise Abatement Society criticised the legislation, saying it would "set residents at odds with local businesses". The act was supported by the British Beer and Pub Association describing many of the regulations before the act was passed as unnecessary.
