= Licensing Act 1953 =

Act of the Parliament of the United Kingdom

Licensing Act 1953 (Note: Section 169(1).)
- Act of Parliament
- Parliament of the United Kingdom
- Long title: An Act to consolidate certain enactments relating to justices' licences for the sale by retail of intoxicating liquor and to the registration of clubs and to matters connected therewith with corrections and improvements made under the Consolidation of Enactments (Procedure) Act, 1949.
- Citation: 1 & 2 Eliz. 2. c. 46
- Territorial extent: England and Wales (Note: Section 169(2).)

Dates
- Royal assent: 31 July 1953
- Commencement: 1 November 1953 (Note: Section 169(3).)
- Repealed: 1 January 1965 (except section 130); 31 July 1965 (section 130)
Other legislation
Amends	See § Repealed enactments
Repeals/revokes	See § Repealed enactments
Amended by	Licensing Act 1961; London Government Act 1963
Repealed by	Weights and Measures Act 1963; Licensing Act 1964

Status: Repealed

Text of statute as originally enacted

The Licensing Act 1953 (1 & 2 Eliz. 2. c. 46) was an act of the Parliament of the United Kingdom that consolidated enactments related to justices' licences for the sale by retail of intoxicating liquor and the registration of clubs in England and Wales.

== Provisions ==
=== Repealed enactments ===
Section 168(1) of the act repealed 28 enactments, listed in the tenth schedule to the act.

Citation	Short title	Extent of repeal
35 Geo. 3. c. 113	Sale of Beer Act 1795	The whole act.
2 & 3 Vict. c. 47	Metropolitan Police Act 1839	Section forty-five.
2 & 3 Vict. c. 93	County Police Act 1839	Section sixteen.
10 & 11 Vict. c. 89	Town Police Clauses Act 1847	Section thirty-four.
2 Edw. 7. c. 28	Licensing Act 1902	Section seven.
10 Edw. 7 & 1 Geo. 5. c. 8	Finance (1909–10) Act 1910	Section eighty-seven.
10 Edw. 7 & 1 Geo. 5. c. 24	Licensing (Consolidation) Act 1910	The whole act.
11 & 12 Geo. 5. c. 42	Licensing Act 1921	The whole act.
13 & 14 Geo. 5. c. 28	Intoxicating Liquor (Sale to Persons under Eighteen) Act 1923	The whole act.
15 & 16 Geo. 5. c. 90	Rating and Valuation Act 1925	In section twenty, in subsection (1), the words from "and for the purpose of determining" to "1910" and the words "or the value of the premises is to be determined" and subsection (2).
23 & 24 Geo. 5. c. 12	Children and Young Persons Act 1933	Section six.
24 & 25 Geo. 5. c. 26	Licensing (Permitted Hours) Act 1934	The whole act.
26 Geo. 5 & 1 Edw. 8. c. 51	Housing Act 1936	Section forty-seven.
5 & 6 Geo. 6. c. 21	Finance Act 1942	In section ten, in subsection (1), the words "this and" and "and in the Sixth Schedule to this Act" and subsections (2) to (6). Part I of the Sixth Schedule.
7 & 8 Geo. 6. c. 23	Finance Act 1944	Sections eight and nine.
7 & 8 Geo. 6. c. 47	Town and Country Planning Act 1944	Section fifteen.
8 & 9 Geo. 6. c. 15	Licensing Planning (Temporary Provisions) Act 1945	The whole act.
9 & 10 Geo. 6. c. 53	Licensing Planning (Temporary Provisions) Act 1946	The whole act.
9 & 10 Geo. 6. c. 64	Finance Act 1946	Section twelve. The First Schedule.
10 & 11 Geo. 6. c. 35	Finance Act 1947	Section seventy-three.
10 & 11 Geo. 6. c. 51	Town and Country Planning Act 1947	In section forty-four, subsection (3). So much of the Eighth Schedule as amends section fifteen of the Town and Country Planning Act 1944, and the Licensing Planning (Temporary Provisions) Acts, 1945 and 1946. So much of the Eleventh Schedule as reprints section fifteen of the Town and Country Planning Act 1944.
12, 13 & 14 Geo. 6. c. lv	London County Council (General Powers) Act 1949	In section forty-five, in subsection (1), the words from "and for the purpose of determining" to "Act 1910" and the words "or the value of the premises is to be determined" and paragraph (6) of the proviso.
12, 13 & 14 Geo. 6. c. 59	Licensing Act 1949	The whole act except subsection (1) of section four and sections twenty-six, twenty-seven, forty-two and forty-three.
12, 13 & 14 Geo. 6. c. 84	War Damaged Sites Act 1949	In section forty-two, in subsection (1), the definitions of "Act of 1921", "Act of 1945", "canteen", "London", "mess" and "registered", and subsection (3). Section fourteen.
12, 13 & 14 Geo. 6. c. 101	Justices of the Peace Act 1949	Section twelve.
15 & 16 Geo. 6 & 1 Eliz. 2. c. 44	Customs and Excise Act 1952	In section nineteen, subsection (13). In section one hundred and fifty, paragraph (5) of the proviso to subsection (1). In section one hundred and fifty-one, in subsection (2), paragraph (a) and the proviso. In section three hundred and seven, in subsection (1), in the definition of "justices' licence or certificate", the words "licence or" and the words from "a justices' licence" to "1910, or".
15 & 16 Geo. 6 & 1 Eliz. 2. c. 65	Licensed Premises in New Towns Act 1952	The whole act.
1 & 2 Eliz. 2. c. 5	Expiring Laws Continuance Act 1952	In the Schedule, the entry relating to the Licensing Planning (Temporary Provisions) Act, 1945.

== Subsequent developments ==
Section 130 of the act was repealed by section 63(1) of, and part II of schedule 9 to, the Weights and Measures Act 1963, which came into force on 31 July 1965.

The whole act, except section 130, was repealed by section 203(3) of, and schedule 15 to, the Licensing Act 1964, which came into force on 1 January 1965.
