= Licensing Act 2003 =

Act of the Parliament of the United Kingdom

Licensing Act 2003 (Note: Section 201(1).)
- Act of Parliament
- Parliament of the United Kingdom
- Long title: An Act to make provision about the regulation of the sale and supply of alcohol, the provision of entertainment and the provision of late night refreshment, about offences relating to alcohol and for connected purposes.
- Citation: 2003 c. 17
- Territorial extent: England and WalesNorthern Ireland (section 155(1).; (Note: Sections 201(3)–(5).)

Dates
- Royal assent: 10 July 2003
- Commencement: Various (Note: Section 201(2).)
Other legislation
Amends	Disorderly Houses Act 1751; Metropolitan Police Act 1839; Town Police Clauses Act 1847; Inebriates Act 1898; Civic Restaurants Act 1947; Common Informers Act 1951; Obscene Publications Act 1959; Hypnotism Act 1952; London Government Act 1963; Administration of Justice Act 1964; Courts Act 1971; Lotteries and Amusements Act 1976; Rent Act 1977; Customs and Excise Management Act 1979; Magistrates' Courts Act 1980; Senior Courts Act 1981; Sporting Events (Control of Alcohol etc.) Act 1985; Fire Safety and Safety of Places of Sport Act 1987; Town and Country Planning Act 1990; Sunday Trading Act 1994; Coal Industry Act 1994; Cinemas Act 1985; Confiscation of Alcohol (Young Persons) Act 1997; Access to Justice Act 1999
Repeals/revokes	Universities (Wine Licences) Act 1743; Sunday Observance Act 1780; Sunday Entertainments Act 1932; Licensing Act 1964; Refreshment Houses Act 1964; Private Places of Entertainment (Licensing) Act 1967; Licensing (Amendment) Act 1967; Late Night Refreshment Houses Act 1969; Sunday Theatre Act 1972; Licensing (Amendment) Act 1976; Licensing (Amendment) Act 1977; Licensing (Amendment) Act 1980; Licensing (Amendment) Act 1981; Licensing (Occasional Permissions) Act 1983; Licensing (Amendment) Act 1985; Licensing Act 1988; Licensing (Retail Sales) Act 1988; Licensing (Amendment) Act 1989; Sporting Events (Control of Alcohol etc.) (Amendment) Act 1992; Licensing (Sunday Hours) Act 1995; Public Entertainments Licences (Drug Misuse) Act 1997; Licensing (Young Persons) Act 2000
Amended by	Mental Capacity Act 2005; Violent Crime Reduction Act 2006; National Health Service (Consequential Provisions) Act 2006; Statute Law (Repeals) Act 2008; Charities Act 2011; Live Music Act 2012; Co-operative and Community Benefit Societies Act 2014; Policing and Crime Act 2017; Digital Markets, Competition and Consumers Act 2024; Terrorism (Protection of Premises) Act 2025; Licensing Hours Extensions Act 2026
Relates to	Licensing (Scotland) Act 2005; Licensing (Northern Ireland) Order 1996

Status: Amended

Text of statute as originally enacted

Revised text of statute as amended

The Licensing Act 2003 (c. 17) is an act of the Parliament of the United Kingdom. The act establishes a single integrated scheme for licensing premises in England and Wales used to sell or supply of alcohol, provide regulated entertainment, or provide late night refreshment. It allows some or all of these licensable activities to be contained in a single licence, a "premises licence", which replaced other schemes. Responsibility for issuing licences is given to local authorities, specifically London boroughs, metropolitan boroughs, unitary authorities, and district councils, who took over this power from the justices of the peace under a system of licensing committees. It came into effect midnight, 24 November 2005.

== Key measures ==
Key measures contained in the act include:

Flexible opening hours
Flexible opening hours for licensed premises, with the potential for up to 24 hour opening, seven days a week, are available. As well as the flexibility, the granting of these new type of licences is to be subject to consideration of the impact on local residents, businesses, and the expert opinion of a range of authorities in relation to the licensing objectives. This flexibility is intended to minimise public disorder resulting from a set closing time whereby numerous intoxicated individuals may leave licensed premises simultaneously at 23:00. It is also an effort to decrease the culture of "binge-drinking".
Single premises licences
The single integrated premises licence, bringing together the six existing licensing regimes (for alcohol, public entertainment, cinemas, theatres, late night refreshment houses, and night cafés) to cut down on bureaucracy and simplify such provisions.
Personal licences
A new system of personal licences relating to the supply of alcohol that enables licence holders to move more freely between premises where a premises licence is in force than is currently the case.

== Licensing committee ==
Each local authority must set up a licensing committee with between ten and fifteen members; it is assumed that most member level decisions will be made by a sub-committee of three. The committee can and is expected to have a scheme of delegation for different types of decision; this means that many applications will be decided by officers. The full committee is expected to receive monitoring reports.

The committee is not regarded as quasi-judicial (Hope and Glory Public House Ltd, R v City of Westminster Magistrates Court & Ors [2011] EWCA Civ 31), and should make its decisions in accordance with the principles of natural justice and with regard to the Human Rights Act 1998 (Articles 1, 6 and 8 of the European Convention on Human Rights are likely to be engaged). It has been suggested that councillors should not be involved in any way in decisions on premises in their ward, and the Standards Board for England has advised that only councillors who are members of the committee should have any role in considering applications.

The Licensing Act sets out four licensing objectives of no preferential order which must be taken into account and adhered to:

- The prevention of crime and disorder,
- public safety,
- prevention of public nuisance, and
- the protection of children from harm

In Scotland there is a fifth licensing objective: protecting and improving public health.

== Licensable activities ==
The act defines "licensable activities" as:

- The retail sale of alcohol,
- the supply of alcohol in clubs,
- the provision of late night refreshment, and
- the provision of regulated entertainment

In turn, "regulated entertainment" is defined as:

- A performance of a play,
- an exhibition of a film,
- an indoor sporting event,
- a boxing or wrestling entertainment (both indoors and outdoors),
- a performance of live music,
- any playing of recorded music, or
- a performance of dance

in the presence of an audience (which may be just one person). There are exceptions (e.g., Morris dancing and similar) and refinements (e.g., karaoke is considered to be music).

"Late night refreshment" is defined as the supply of hot food or drink (i.e., food or drink that is either served at, or has been heated on the premises to, a point above ambient temperature) to the public for consumption, both on or off the premises, between 23:00 and 05:00.

== Premises licences ==
A premises licence is required for any premises offering licensable activities. Once a licence is granted, it is valid until it is either surrendered or lapses in accordance with the act, in contrast to previous schemes, where the licence generally had to be renewed annually. The application for a premises licence requires the completion of an operating schedule, and the offering of conditions to be included on the premises licence and a plan of the premises.

A premises licence that includes the sale of alcohol must name an individual who holds a personal licence granted under the act. This person is known as the designated premises supervisor (DPS) and must sign a consent form agreeing to being named as the DPS. Applicants must serve a copy of the application on responsible authorities, which include: the licensing authority (the council), the police, the fire authority, the body of responsible for health and safety enforcement, the body responsible for dealing with pollution (environmental health), a body responsible for advising on child protection issues, the planning authority, and the weights and measures/trading standards authority. Responsible authorities can make representations to the licensing authority about an application. The application must also be advertised by way of a blue notice displayed on or near to the premises for 28 days and in a local newspaper on one working day within ten working days of making the application. In addition to the responsible authorities, the act allows for any "other person" to make representations. If representation is made, the licensing authority must hold a hearing in most cases.

After the hearing, the authority can make one of five decisions:

- Grant the licence with conditions that match the operating schedule (and conditions can be added)
- Exclude some licensable activities from the application
- Refuse to accept the person specified as DPS (only on police advice)
- Approve different part of the premises for different activities
- Reject the application entirely. An unsuccessful applicant can appeal to the magistrates' court; an interested third party who disagrees with a decision to grant a licence can also appeal against the council's decision.

Any person or responsible authority can apply to the licensing authority for a review of an existing premises licence, with the aim of amending its conditions or revoking it entirely.

== Cumulative impact policy ==
Although not specifically referred to in the original act, guidance is provided for the establishment of cumulative impact zones (CIZ), which allows licensing authorities to designate an area as such when there is evidence that the accumulation of licensed premises within it may cause one or more of the licensing objectives to be undermined if further licences are granted.

A research study in the London Borough of Southwark found no evidence that CIZ establishment reduced the number of successful applications nor impacted on the relative proportion of licence applications receiving objections.

Cumulative impact assessments were formally included in the Licensing Act 2003 (as section 5A) by the Policing and Crime Act 2017.

== Personal licences ==
A personal licence allows a person to sell or authorise the sale of alcohol under the authority of a premises license. Anyone can apply for a personal licence to the licensing authority for the area in which they live. They must show a licensing qualification and a criminal record clean of relevant offences. The local authority can only refuse such an application on police advice. The licence lasts indefinitely after changes to legislation were made, where it had to be renewed every 10 years.

Anyone who already had a licence under the previous licensing schemes in their name – typically a pub landlord – were grandfathered without applying for a qualification.

If an applicant does not live within a local authority's area, they can apply to any authority of their choice.

== Temporary event notices ==
Any person over 18 can serve the local authority and local police with a temporary event notice (TEN) for an event which would normally need a premises licence, but which would be for a maximum period of 168 hours, and for a maximum number of 499 people. Examples of events that could be covered by a TEN include a pub wants to stay open all weekend for a special occasion, but does not want to apply for, or cannot get, a licence allowing this all the time; or a beer tent in a summer fair. TENs also cover licensing over alcohol to clubs, entertainment or late night refreshment (serving hot food between 23:00 and 05:00). A notice currently costs £21.00.

TENs must be submitted at least ten working days before an event is due to start. Notice is given to the council responsible for the area in which the event is to be held. A copy of this notice must be sent to the police that cover that area and the Environmental Health department. The police and Environmental Health have three working days to make an objection. Anyone who does not have a personal licence can give only five notices a year, while a personal licence holder can give 50. A TEN can only be given in respect of the same premises fifteen times in a calendar year. On 25 April 2012 a late TEN was introduced, which can be submitted between five and nine working days before the event and should only be used when unforeseen circumstances lead to short notice.

There is no need for permission for a temporary event; the prospective premises user only has to formally notify the council and police that the event will take place. So long as the criteria noted above are met (as well as any others that may apply, for example, if alcohol is being sold, that provisions are in place to stop persons under the age of 18 from buying it) and the police have no objections, the event can proceed. The council cannot impose any further conditions, limitations or restrictions, but if the authority is convinced that any of the above limits will be exceeded, or they uphold a police objection (which can only be made on the grounds of crime prevention), they will issue a counter-notice which effectively cancels the TEN.

== Children and the act ==
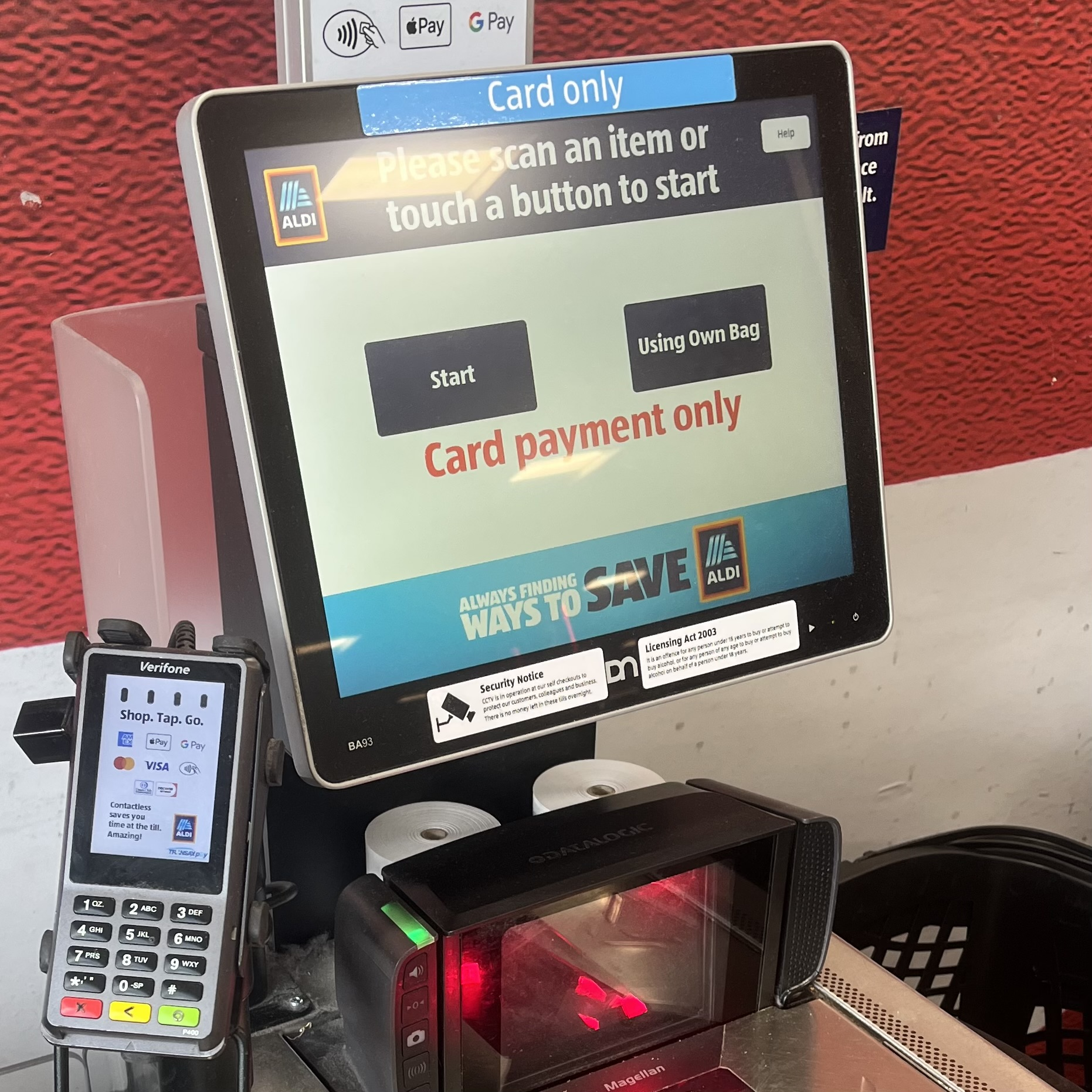
Aldi self-checkout in England with a label referring to the 2003 act stating "It is an offence for any person under 18 years to buy or attempt to buy alcohol or for any person of any age to buy or attempt to buy alcohol on behalf of a person under 18 years."

The act made a few important changes to the current law regarding children and alcohol, although they were not publicised at the time. For instance, a rule allowing children under eighteen years of age to sell alcohol in supermarkets is extended to all licensees, as long as "the sale or supply has been specifically approved by that or another responsible person", thus making it legal for people under 18 to work in a bar. However, children working behind bars are monitored by other legislative acts such as the Children and Young Persons Act 1933.

Someone under the age of eighteen attempting to purchase alcohol for the first time in English law is considered a criminal offence, and is punishable by a fine of up to £1,000 (or level 3 on the standard scale). Prior to the act, children aged 5 and over were legally able to drink alcohol in a beer garden but not in the bar as long as it had been bought by an adult.

== Effects and reactions ==
=== Licensing hours ===
The act has caused some controversy. Some British drinkers and many tourists are frustrated with the traditional closing time of 23:00, as opposed to the more liberal drinking regulations elsewhere in Europe and further afield, and believe extending drinking times will reduce "drinking against the clock", a precursor to binge drinking. Conversely, those against the legislation believe that binge drinking will increase, as drinkers will have more time to get drunk. One retired chief superintendent reflected that the act had “placed extraordinary demands on already stretched police resources”.

=== Impact on live music ===
The new requirement that there be a licence for the playing of live music in any venue, no matter how small, has been criticised for reducing the number of places where artists can play to tiny audiences. There have been press stories about how the law unreasonably singles out the playing of musical instruments when compared to other forms of entertainment, such as circus performances.

To deal with the concerns raised, the Live Music Forum was set up, chaired by Feargal Sharkey. Its report, issued in July 2007, reported that overall "the Licensing Act has had a neutral effect on the UK’s live music scene", but recommended there should be more flexibility of the application of the act on smaller premises. However, the introduction of Form 696 by the Metropolitan Police Service as part of the licensing system for live music has been criticised by Sharkey and others for the restrictions imposed on music promoters in London.

The concerns raised led to the Live Music Act 2012, which exempted live music performances at licensed premises with a capacity of 500 or fewer between 08:00 and 23:00 from requiring a separate entertainment licence.

=== Loophole ===
Licensing officials highlighted a fault in the provisions of the act in 2026 which enables a licence holder to transfer their licence to another person. This provision has highlighted a concern that when a license holder is under investigation they can evade this process and continue with any illicit activities. The government is said to have plans in place to address this deficiency.

== Implementation of the act ==
Any premises that had an old-scheme licence were able to apply for that licence to be converted; provided there was no material change in the use of the premises, the local authority was effectively bound to agree to the conversion. Licensees had to apply for this by 6 August 2005. By that date, it was reported that most pubs had applied, but many off-licences had not. Although the right to convert current licences expired on 6 August, premises could still apply as "new" premises, without benefiting from a grandfather clause. The new licensing laws came into effect at midnight on 24 November 2005.

In a report on the new legislation in November 2006, the Institute of Alcohol Studies reported that one year after implementation "opinions were divided, as expected, leading to the unavoidable polarisation of the debate, increasingly centred upon the misguided notion of ‘24 hour drinking’".

On 8 November 2007, the Department for Culture, Media and Sport reported that there were 176,400 licensed premises in England and Wales. Only 5,100 premises have 24 hour licences, most of which (65 per cent) are hotel bars. Only 460 pubs, bars, or nightclubs have 24 hour licences.

== Further developments ==
Licensing Hours Extensions Act 2026 (Note: Section 2(3).)
- Act of Parliament
- Parliament of the United Kingdom
- Long title: An Act to amend the Licensing Act 2003 so that licensing hours orders can be made by negative resolution statutory instrument.
- Citation: 2026 c. 4
- Introduced by: Andrew Ranger (Commons); Lord Watson of Wyre Forest (Lords)
- Territorial extent: England and Wales (Note: Section 2(1).)

Dates
- Royal assent: 12 February 2026
- Commencement: 12 February 2026 (Note: Section 2(2).)
Other legislation
Amends	Licensing Act 2003

Status: Current legislation

History of passage through Parliament

Text of statute as originally enacted

In 2026, the act was amended by the Licensing Hours Extensions Act 2026 (c. 4), to change the procedure for approving statutory instruments easing restrictions under the act relating to allowing last orders from the affirmative procedure to the annulment procedure.

The 2026 legislation was supported by the British Beer & Pub Association.

== See also ==
- Zoo Bar (Halifax, West Yorkshire)
