= Business Names Act 1985 =

Act of the Parliament of the United Kingdom

Business Names Act 1985 (Note: Section 11.)
- Act of Parliament
- Parliament of the United Kingdom
- Long title: An Act to consolidate certain enactments relating to the names under which persons may carry on business in Great Britain.
- Citation: 1985 c. 7
- Territorial extent: England and Wales; Scotland; (Note: Section 9.)

Dates
- Royal assent: 11 March 1985
- Commencement: 1 July 1985 (Note: Section 10.)
- Repealed: 1 October 2009 (Note: The Companies Act 2006 (Commencement No. 5, Transitional Provisions and Savings) Order 2007 (SI 2007/3495).)
Other legislation
Amended by	Statute Law (Repeals) Act 1993; Scotland Act 1998 (Consequential Modifications) (No. 2) Order 1999; Limited Liability Partnerships Regulations 2001; Government of Wales Act 2006 (Consequential Modifications and Transitional Provisions) Order 2007
Repealed by	Companies Act 2006

Status: Repealed

Text of statute as originally enacted

Revised text of statute as amended

The Business Names Act 1985 (c. 7) was an act of the Parliament of the United Kingdom. It has since been repealed.

== See also ==
- Companies Act 2006
- Company, Limited Liability Partnership and Business (Names and Trading Disclosures) Regulations 2015
