= Zoo Bar (Halifax, West Yorkshire) =

Nightclub in Halifax, West Yorkshire, England

The Empire Bar and Zoo Bar were two adjoining night clubs in Halifax, West Yorkshire, England. First called The Zoo Bar, followed by the Rock Shed founded by Local Rock DJ - Jon Ingle, in the early 1980s, Ian Dobbs sold the venue in the latter part of the 1980s and then became "Theo's Zoo bar", in the early 1990s, and named after the head bouncer, the original venue was a standalone nightclub. The Tramshed and Zoo Bar were brought to national attention by the media as a "haven" for underage drinkers, when they became among the first establishments to be closed under the auspices of the Licensing Act 2003, which came into effect in England and Wales at midnight on 23 November 2005.

== Background ==
Originally named the zoo bar ( Hopwood Lane entrance) and Empire night club ( Lord Street entrance), it was founded by a local Rock DJ called Jon Ingle to serve the local bikers and heavy rock fans, the two night clubs were merged by Jon Ingle into one venue called the Rock Shed; The owner of the premises (Ian Dobbs) sold the business in the latter part of the 1980s when it was renamed "Theo's Zoo bar" after the head bouncer and before the reputation of an underage venue the Zoo bar was one of the first "indie" clubs in Halifax. It was classed as an alternative club where people classed the customers as slightly weird. The Djs played classics like the Doors' "Light My Fire" and the Rolling Stones' "Sympathy for the Devil" etc. later filling the dance-floor to tunes by the latest indie gods such as Suede, Pulp etc. Characters always filled the club. There was "roller guy" who wore roller boots and took photos all night, "daddy Acid" who used to walk around with a bowl of fruit (apparently laced with acid tabs). It was a real hive and buzzing place of individual clubbers.

The tramshed which opened later was home to the upcoming dance scene and often played hours of trance with old black and white movies playing on a huge screen.

Drugs became a huge problem within the clubs and that was the start of the demise. Theo sold up and it was then that the clubs took on a new crowd mainly underage drinkers.

The Tramshed and Zoo Bars were side-by-side nightclubs in Halifax featuring rock, emo, indie, punk and ska music. They were located on Lord Street close to the former site of Samuel Webster's Fountain Head Brewery. The property the clubs were located in has now been demolished and the land used for social housing.

Police officers raided the nightclub on 18 November 2005. During the raid, police reportedly identified 420 of the 500 people in the club to be underage drinkers. More than a dozen youths were arrested following scuffles with the police. A 28-day temporary closure order was applied for by the police on 27 November 2005.

This 2005 incident was cited as the third such raid of the Tramshed and Zoo Bar in which under-age drinking was proven. Previous occasions included December 2003, when almost half of the 150 revellers were found to be under 18. At that time the youngest was 13 and a member of the bar staff was 15. In July 2004, more under-age drinkers were found. Immediately after that incident, attempts to revoke the license under the old licensing laws failed. A local inspector said that, "We have tried to engage with the licensee on numerous occasions without success... It is the most serious breach of under-age drinking we have come across and there is historical evidence it has happened there before."

== Effects ==
After it was closed, the Halifax Zoo Bar incident became an international lightning rod in Europe, as one paper cited it as a "notorious kiddie boozer" where "legless" youths could do whatever they wanted. The nightclub was identified in an American study regarding youths and alcohol, as it was the topic of an alcohol advertisement.

Two years after its closure, consequences of the Licensing Act 2003 are still being felt. Another establishment in Halifax, Fagins Bar, was also closed for underage drinking, after being raided in December 2005, this has since reopened with merit. The Trax night club in Havering was raided at 9 pm on 25 November for drug dealing and its licence revoked. Cardiff City has also implemented its usage to close down clubs.

In the first year of the Licensing Act 2003 being passed, 100 establishments in England and Wales had their licenses revoked, with some temporarily suspended and others having conditions of use attached.

The building which housed the Tramshed and Zoo Bar has been sold to developers and is currently undergoing a renovation that will convert the spaces into flats.

== Live music performances ==
The Rock Shed / Zoo Bar (and later the Tram-Shed) nightclubs would host live bands particularly on a Saturday night with varying frequency. Many of the artists came from the West Yorkshire area and usually performed the Punk, Ska or Indie genres of music. The bands that performed have gone on to receive varying degrees of national acclaim.

Bands which have performed at The Zoo Bar include well known acts such as The Prophecy, Old Man's Child, thesevenmachine, Worm and Lymph.

For an extended period during 2004–2005, in response to the increased attendances on Friday nights (and as a result the decreased popularity of the club on a Saturday) a stage was set up and bands encouraged to perform on Saturdays. The night was sponsored by local music shop First Floor Music.

The Tram-Shed part of the nightclub has also previously played host to the heats of 2005 The Pulse of West Yorkshire battle of the bands.
