= Licensing Act 1964 =

Act of the Parliament of the United Kingdom

Licensing Act 1964 (Note: Section 204(1).)
- Act of Parliament
- Parliament of the United Kingdom
- Long title: An Act to consolidate certain enactments relating to the sale and supply of intoxicating liquor in England and Wales and to matters connected therewith; with corrections and improvements made under the Consolidation of Enactments (Procedure) Act 1949.
- Citation: 1964 c. 26
- Territorial extent: England and Wales (Note: Section 204(3).)

Dates
- Royal assent: 25 March 1964
- Commencement: 1 January 1965 (Note: Section 204(2).)
- Repealed: 24 November 2005 (Note: The Licensing Act 2003 (Commencement No. 7 and Transitional Provisions) Order 2005 (SI 2005/3056).)
Other legislation
Amends	See § Repealed enactments
Repeals/revokes	See § Repealed enactments
Amended by	Theft Act 1968; Justices of the Peace Act 1968; Courts Act 1971; Statute Law (Repeals) Act 1974; Statute Law (Repeals) Act 1978; Statute Law (Repeals) Act 1981; Forgery and Counterfeiting Act 1981; Coal Industry Act 1987; Coal Industry Act 1994; Merchant Shipping Act 1995; Criminal Justice and Police Act 2001
Repealed by	Licensing Act 2003
Relates to	Licensing Act 1953; Licensing Act 2003

Status: Repealed

Text of statute as originally enacted

Revised text of statute as amended

Bold

The Licensing Act 1964 (c. 26) was an act of the Parliament of the United Kingdom that consolidated enactments relating to the sale and supply of intoxicating liquor in England and Wales.

== Provisions ==
=== Repealed enactments ===
Section 203(3) of the act repealed 9 enactments, listed in schedule 15 to the act.

Citation	Short title	Extent of repeal
1 & 2 Eliz. 2. c. 46	Licensing Act 1953	The whole act, except section 130.
2 & 3 Eliz. 2. c. 11	Licensing (Seamen's Canteens) Act 1954	The whole act.
4 & 5 Eliz. 2. c. 37	Licensing (Airports) Act 1956	The whole act.
7 & 8 Eliz. 2. c. 58	Finance Act 1959	In schedule 2, the entry relating to the Licensing Act 1953.
7 & 8 Eliz. 2. c. 62	New Towns Act 1959	Section 9(6).
9 & 10 Eliz. 2. c. 61	Licensing Act 1961	The whole act.
1963 c. 2	Betting, Gaming and Lotteries Act 1963	Section 35(5).
1963 c. 2	Betting, Gaming and Lotteries Act 1963	In section 40, the words "and section 141(1) of the Licensing Act 1953".
1963 c. 2	Betting, Gaming and Lotteries Act 1963	In section 56, subsections (2) and (3).
1963 c. 2	Betting, Gaming and Lotteries Act 1963	In section 57(5), the words "or in section 56(3) of this Act".
1963 c. 33	London Government Act 1963	In schedule 17, paragraphs 14 and 24.
1963 c. 58	Expiring Laws Continuance Act 1963	In the schedule, the entry relating to the Licensing Act 1953.

== Subsequent developments ==
Section 203(1) and (3) of, and schedule 15 to, the act were repealed by section 1 of, and part XI of the schedule to, the Statute Law (Repeals) Act 1974, which came into force on 27 June 1974.

The whole act was repealed by section 199 of, and schedule 7 to, the Licensing Act 2003, which came into force on 24 November 2005.
