= Streets (London) Act 1766 =

Act of the Parliament of Great Britain

- Act of Parliament
- Parliament of Great Britain
- Long title: An Act for putting the Road from Clarges Street to Hyde Park Corner, and from the South End of Park Lane to the North Side of Hertford Street, in the Parish of Saint George Hanover Square, in the County of Middlesex, now under the Direction of the Acts for repairing the Roads in the Parishes of Kensington, Chelsea, Fulham, and Saint George Hanover Square, in the County of Middlesex, under the Management of the Commissioners for paving, cleaning, and lighting, the Squares, Streets, Lanes, and other Places, in Westminster.
- Citation: 6 Geo. 3. c. 54
- Territorial extent: Great Britain

Dates
- Royal assent: 6 June 1766
- Commencement: 17 December 1765 (Note: Start of session.)
- Repealed: 8 April 1819
Other legislation
Amended by	St. George Hanover Square Improvement Act 1813
Repealed by	Westminster Improvement Act 1819
Relates to	Kensington, Chelsea and Fulham Roads (Tolls) Act 1725; Kensington, Chelsea and Fulham Roads (Toll Continuance) Act 1740

Status: Repealed

Text of statute as originally enacted

The Streets (London) Act 1766 (6 Geo. 3. c. 54) was an act of the Parliament of Great Britain that extended previous road repair and maintenance acts, including the Kensington, Chelsea and Fulham Roads (Tolls) Act 1725 (12 Geo. 1. c. 37) and Kensington, Chelsea and Fulham Roads (Toll Continuance) Act 1740 (14 Geo. 2. c. 16), to cover the roads Clarges Street to Hyde Park Corner and from Park Lane to Hertford Street, under the management of the Commissioners responsible for paving, cleaning, and lighting Westminster.

== Background ==
Prior to the late 19th century, Britain lacked a national framework for highway maintenance. The responsibility for road upkeep primarily fell on the local population through two main systems:

- Statute labour: for much of the 17th, 18th and 19th centuries, every able-bodied man to contribute six days of unpaid labour annually to repair local roads.
- Turnpikes: introduced in 1663, toll-gates placed across roads, requiring travellers to pay a fee for passage, with the collected revenue was then used for road repair and maintenance.

Several laws concerning the maintenance of roads in other parishes, including Kensington, Chelsea and Fulham Roads (Tolls) Act 1725 (12 Geo. 1. c. 37) and the Kensington, Chelsea and Fulham Roads (Toll Continuance) Act 1740 (14 Geo. 2. c. 16), authorised the charging of tolls at turnpikes.

Local authorities were motivated to improve the roads Clarges Street to Hyde Park Corner and from Park Lane to Hertford Street, and the resulting benefits to public utility and convenience.

== Provisions ==
The act provided:

- The roads from Clarges Street to Hyde Park Corner and from Park Lane to Hertford Street be placed under the care of the Commissioners responsible for managing roads, lighting, and cleaning in Westminster and other areas covered by previous Acts of Parliament.
- An annual sum of £1000 is to be paid to the Commissioners for road maintenance and improvements, quarterly on specific religious feast days beginning with the Feast of Saint Michael the Archangel in 1766. If payments are late, Commissioners can collect tolls or seize goods to recover the funds.
- The money is to be used exclusively for paving, cleaning, lighting, repairing, and regulating the specified roads.
- Commissioners are allowed to borrow money using the annual £1000 sum as collateral, with detailed documentation of financial transactions.
- Expenses incurred in the passing of the act are to be paid from the first monies raised under its authority.
- Commissioners can continue erect gates at or near the current location of the Hyde Park Corner Turnpike if the Kensington, Chelsea and Fulham Roads (Tolls) Act 1725 (12 Geo. 1. c. 37) and Kensington, Chelsea and Fulham Roads (Toll Continuance) Act 1740 (14 Geo. 2. c. 16) were not extended, with the tolls collected to be used for maintaining and improving roads in the specified areas.
- The act is a public act.

== Subsequent developments ==
So much of the act as relates to repairing the road from Clarges Street to Hyde Park Corner and roads put under the Committee of Paving of St. George Hanover Square was repealed by section 1 of the St. George Hanover Square Improvement Act 1813 (53 Geo. 3. c. xxxviii), which came into force on 15 April 1813.

The rest of the act was repealed by section 1 of the Westminster Improvement Act 1819 (59 Geo. 3. c. xxiii), which came into force on 8 April 1819.

The 19th Statute Law Repeals Report of the Law Commission recommend repealing the Kensington, Chelsea and Fulham Roads (Tolls) Act 1725 (12 Geo. 1. c. 37):

"Since the repair of the roads pursuant to the Act was dependent upon the receipt of those tolls, it follows that the Act as a whole has served no useful purpose for at least 260 years."

The Kensington, Chelsea and Fulham Roads (Tolls) Act 1725 (12 Geo. 1. c. 37) was repealed by the Statute Law (Repeals) Act 2013 which received royal assent on 31 January 2013, but the Kensington, Chelsea and Fulham Roads (Toll Continuance) Act 1740 (14 Geo. 2. c. 16) and was not formally repealed.
