= Kensington, Chelsea and Fulham Roads (Toll Continuance) Act 1740 =

Act of the Parliament of Great Britain

- Act of Parliament
- Parliament of Great Britain
- Long title: An Act for enlarging the Term and Powers granted by an Act made in the Twelfth Year of the Reign of His late Majesty King George the First, intituled, "An Act for repairing the Roads in the Parishes of Kensington, Chelsea, and Fulham, and other Parishes therein mentioned, in the County of Middlesex;" and for repairing some other Roads, in the Parish of St. George, Hanover Square, and the said Parishes of Kensington and Chelsea.
- Citation: 14 Geo. 2. c. 16
- Territorial extent: Great Britain

Dates
- Royal assent: 21 March 1741
- Commencement: 18 November 1740 (Note: Start of session.)
Other legislation
Amends	Kensington, Chelsea and Fulham Roads (Tolls) Act 1725
Amended by	St. George Hanover Square Improvement Act 1813
Relates to	Fulham Roads Act 1730; Fulham Roads Act 1749; Streets (London) Act 1766; Statute Law (Repeals) Act 2013

Status: Amended

Text of statute as originally enacted

The Kensington, Chelsea and Fulham Roads (Toll Continuance) Act 1740 (14 Geo. 2. c. 16) is a act of the Parliament of Great Britain that extended by 21-years the Kensington, Chelsea and Fulham Roads (Tolls) Act 1725 (12 Geo. 1. c. 37) for the charging of tolls at turnpikes along specified roads in the parishes of Kensington, Chelsea and Fulham in the county of Middlesex.

The act became obsolete in 1747, and although the act it extended was repealed by the Statute Law (Repeals) Act 2013, as of 2025, the act remains in force in Great Britain.

== Background ==
Prior to the late 19th century, Britain lacked a national framework for highway maintenance. The responsibility for road upkeep primarily fell on the local population through two main systems:

- Statute labour: for much of the 17th, 18th and 19th centuries, every able-bodied man to contribute six days of unpaid labour annually to repair local roads.
- Turnpikes: introduced in 1663, toll-gates placed across roads, requiring travellers to pay a fee for passage, with the collected revenue was then used for road repair and maintenance.

The Kensington, Chelsea and Fulham Roads (Tolls) Act 1725 (12 Geo. 1. c. 37) authorised the charging of tolls at turnpikes along specified roads in the parishes of Kensington, Chelsea and Fulham that had become poorly maintained, requiring repair:

- From Counters Bridge in Kensington to the Stones End near Piccadilly
- From Fulham ferry to Knightsbridge
- From Chelsea ferry to the Stones End at James Street, Westminster
- From the town of Kensington to Chelsea Church
- From the junction of North End and the Hammersmith Road to Wansdown Green
- From Hyde Park Corner to the lower road from Chelsea to Westminster

The toll granted by the Kensington, Chelsea and Fulham Roads (Tolls) Act 1725 took place on 1 June 1726 for a term of 21 years, with authority to charge tolls to expire no later than 31 May 1747.

== Provisions ==
The act provided that the tolls authorised by the Kensington, Chelsea and Fulham Roads (Tolls) Act 1725 are "further continued for 21 years".

== Repeal ==
The 19th Statute Law Repeals Report of the Law Commission recommend repealing the Kensington, Chelsea and Fulham Roads (Tolls) Act 1725 (12 Geo. 1. c. 37):

"Since the repair of the roads pursuant to the Act was dependent upon the receipt of those tolls, it follows that the Act as a whole has served no useful purpose for at least 260 years."

The Kensington, Chelsea and Fulham Roads (Tolls) Act 1725 (12 Geo. 1. c. 37) was repealed by the Statute Law (Repeals) Act 2013 which received royal assent on 31 January 2013, but this act was not formally repealed.
