= Turnpike trusts in the West Midlands =

Historic road maintenance bodies in England

This is a list of turnpike trusts that maintained roads in the West Midlands.

Between 1663 and 1836, the Parliament of Great Britain and the Parliament of the United Kingdom passed a series of acts of Parliament that created organisations – turnpike trusts – that collected road tolls, and used the money to repair the road. These applied to major roads, around a fifth of the road network. The turnpike system was phased out in the 1870s, and major roads transitioned in the 1880s to the maintenance of the new county councils.

The counties used for these lists are the historic counties of England that existed at the time of the turnpike trusts. This article lists those in the West Midlands: Herefordshire, Shropshire, Staffordshire, Warwickshire, and Worcestershire.

== Herefordshire ==
Trust	Founded	Initial act	
Trust	Founded	Citation	Title
Blue Mantle Hall Turnpike Trust	1758	32 Geo. 2. c. 66	Hereford and Salop Roads Act 1758; An Act for amending and widening the Roads leading from Stretford's Bridge in the County of Hereford, to The New Inn in the Parish of Winstanstow, in the County of Salop; and also the Road from Blue Mantle Hall, near Mortimer's Cross, to Aymstrey in the said County of Hereford; and for repealing so much of an Act made in the Twenty-second Year of the Reign of His present Majesty, as relates to the Road from Mortimer's Cross to Aymstrey Bridge.
Bromyard Turnpike Trust; Hope to Bromyard Turnpike Trust	1751	25 Geo. 2. c. 56	Hereford Roads Act 1751; An Act for repairing the several Roads leading from the Town of Bromyard in the County of Hereford, to the several Places called The Halfway Ash in the Parish of Docklow, Herefordshire Lake in the Parish of Whitburne, Perry Bridge in the Parish of Stoke Bliss, leading through the several Parishes of Edwin, Ralph, Collington, and the Hamlet of Little Kyre, Sapey Wood in the Parish of Upper Sapey, Bishop's Froome, Wooferwood Gate, and Herefordshire Lake, in the said Parish of Bromyard, in the Counties of Hereford and Worcester.
Clifford to Dewchurch Turnpike Trust	1782	22 Geo. 3. c. 112	Hereford Roads Act 1782; An Act for repairing and widening the Roads from a Place called The Hardwicke, in the Parish of Clifford, to Windmill Hill, and from Vowchurch to Pontrilas, in the County of Hereford.
Hereford Turnpike Trust	1729	3 Geo. 2. c. 18	Hereford Roads Act 1729; An Act for repairing the several Roads leading into the City of Hereford.
Kingsham, Kington, Radnor Turnpike Trust	1788	28 Geo. 3. c. 105	Radnor Roads Act 1788; An Act for amending, widening, and keeping in Repair the Roads leading from Staplebar to Lingen, and from thence by Boresford to Willey's Oak, and from Kingsham to the Kington and Radnor Turnpike Roads near the Rod, and from Lingen aforesaid, to Walford in the County of Hereford.
Kington Turnpike Trust	1756	29 Geo. 2. c. 65	Hereford Roads Act 1756; An Act for repairing and widening the Roads leading from the Town of Kington in the County of Hereford, through The Welsh Hall Lane, as far as the same County extends, and the several Roads leading from Kington aforesaid, to Brilley's Mountain, to Eardisley, to Almely, to Eckley's Green, to Eardisland, to Staple Bar, and to Milton House, in the said County of Hereford.
Ledbury Turnpike Trust	1720	7 Geo. 1. St. 1. c. 23	Ledbury Highways Act 1720; An Act for repairing the several Roads leading from the Town of Ledbury, in the County of Hereford, to the several Places therein mentioned.
Leominster Turnpike Trust	1728	2 Geo. 2. c. 13	Leominster Roads Act 1728; An Act for repairing the several Roads therein mentioned, leading into the Town of Leominster, in the County of Hereford.
Leominster and Ledbury Turnpike Trust	1825	6 Geo. 4. c. xxvi	Leominster and Ledbury Road Act 1825; An Act for making a Turnpike Road from the Hope Turnpike, in the Leominster and Hereford Road, to or near Burley Gate, in the Hereford and Bromyard Turnpike Road, and from thence to a Place called The Trumpet, in the Ledbury and Hereford Turnpike Road, all in the County of Hereford.
Madeley Turnpike Trust	1764	4 Geo. 3. c. 81	Salop Roads (No. 2) Act 1764; An Act for amending, widening, and keeping in Repair, several Roads leading from the Buck's Head at Watling Street to Beckbury and The New Inn, and from Birches Brook to the Hand Post in the Parish of Kemberton, in the County of Salop.
Monkland and Parton Turnpike Trust	1782	22 Geo. 3. c. 100	Hereford and Worcester Roads Act 1782; An Act for amending and keeping in Repair the Road leading from the Willersley Turnpike Road near Parton to Monkland Mill, and from the Turnpike Road on Fair Mile Field, to the Turnpike Road at Broad Heath, and from the Turnpike Road at or near the Ford's Bridge to the Turnpike Road near Stockton, and from Kyre Common to the Turnpike Road at Grendon Green, in the Counties of Hereford and Worcester.
Presteigne Turnpike Trust	1756	29 Geo. 2. c. 94	Presteigne Road Act 1756; An Act for amending, repairing, and widening, the Roads leading from The Ryeway in the Parish of Yarpole in the County of Hereford, to Presteigne in the County of Radnor, and from thence to Leintwardine, and from Presteigne aforesaid to the Top of Trap Hill, and from The Ryeway aforesaid, by The Maidenhead, to Wooferton in the County of Salop.
Presteigne to Knighton Turnpike Trust	1767	7 Geo. 3. c. 67	Hereford Roads Act 1766; An Act for amending, repairing, and widening, several Roads in the Counties of Radnor and Hereford.
Ross Turnpike Trust	1725	12 Geo. 1. c. 13	Gloucester and Hereford Roads Act 1725; An Act for repairing and widening the Roads from the City of Gloucester to the City of Hereford.
Ross, Abergavenny, Gosmont and Hay Turnpike Trust; Crickhowell to New Inn Turnpike Trust	1772	12 Geo. 3. c. 105	Brecon Roads Act 1772; An Act for amending, widening, and altering, the Roads leading from Crickhowell, in the County of Brecon, to the Cross Hands, beyond New Inn, in the Turnpike Road between the City of Hereford and Ross; and from a Place called The Lower Cross Ways, in the Parish of Saint Maughan's to the Town of Grosmount, in the County of Monmouth; and from a Smith's Shop at Stanton, in the Parish of Llanvihangel, to Chapel a Fine, in the same County; and from the Turnpike Road, in the Parish of Welsh Newton, in the County of Hereford, to Ponttanast, in the Parish of Cluddock, in the said County.
Whitchurch and Llangarren Turnpike Trust	1819	59 Geo. 3. c. lx	Hereford Roads Act 1819; An Act to enlarge the Term and Powers of an Act of His present Majesty[o] for repairing the Roads leading into the City of Hereford, and several Roads communicating therewith; for transferring the Road from Wormelow Tump to Harewood, from the Madley to the Hereford District, and for making a new Road from the Tuft Wood, in the Parish of Hentland, to the Confines of the Parish of Ganerew, in the County of Hereford, as a Third District.
Whitney and Brewardine Turnpike Trust	1759	33 Geo. 2. c. 58	Hereford Roads, etc. Act 1759; An Act for repairing the Roads from the Town of Brecon to the Parish of Brobury, and to Whitney Passage, in the County of Hereford; and for building a Bridge over the River Wye, at Bredwardine Passage in the same County.
Wyeside Turnpike Trust	1767	7 Geo. 3. c. 67	Hereford Roads Act 1766; An Act for amending, repairing, and widening, several Roads in the Counties of Radnor and Hereford.

== Shropshire ==
Trust	Founded	Initial act	
Trust	Founded	Citation	Title
Atcham to Dorrington Turnpike Trust	1797	37 Geo. 3. c. 172	Salop Roads Act 1797; An Act for amending, widening, altering, improving, and keeping in repair, the road leading from Atcham, through Condover to Dorrington; and also the road branching out of the said road, at a place called Allfield Turning, in the said parish of Condover, to the turnpike road leading from Shrewsbury to Ludlow, at a place called Hongerhill, in the same parish, all in the county of Salop.
Audlem and Woore Turnpike Trust	1767	7 Geo. 3. c. 92	Roads from Whitchurch and Hinstock Act 1766; An Act to repair and widen the Roads from Whitchurch in the County of Salop, to the Turnpike Road between Nantwich in the County of Chester and Newcastle under Line, and from Hinstock to Nantwich aforesaid.
Bishop's Castle Turnpike Trust	1768	8 Geo. 3. c. 51	Salop, Radnor and Montgomery Roads Act 1768; An Act for amending and widening several Roads leading from the Town of Bishop's Castle, and from Montgomery, to the Turnpike Road at Westbury, and from Brocton to the Turnpike Road at Minsterley, in the several Counties of Salop, Radnor, and Montgomery.
Bridgnorth and Shifnal Turnpike Trust	1763	3 Geo. 3. c. 59	Stafford, Sandon and Eccleshall Road Act 1763; An Act for repairing and widening the Road leading from the Town of Stafford to Sandon in the County of Stafford, and several other Roads in the Counties of Salop and Stafford.
Bridgnorth and Shifnal Turnpike Trust	1804	44 Geo. 3. c. xii	Road from Stafford to Sandon Act 1804; An Act for enlarging the term and powers of two acts, made in the third and twenty-third years of his present Majesty, for repairing the road from the town of Stafford to Sandon in the county of Stafford, and several other roads in the counties of Salop and Stafford, so far as the same relate to the third district of roads therein mentioned.
Bridgnorth to Black Brook Turnpike Trust	1751	25 Geo. 2. c. 49	Shropshire Roads Act 1751; An Act for repairing the High Road from the Town of Shrewsbury, through Cressage, Harley, Much Wenlock, by Muckley Cross, and through Morville, to Bridgenorth, in the County of Salop.
Bridgnorth Morvill Turnpike Trust	1751	25 Geo. 2. c. 49	Shropshire Roads Act 1751; An Act for repairing the High Road from the Town of Shrewsbury, through Cressage, Harley, Much Wenlock, by Muckley Cross, and through Morville, to Bridgenorth, in the County of Salop.
Bridgnorth Smithy Brook Turnpike Trust	1751	25 Geo. 2. c. 49	Shropshire Roads Act 1751; An Act for repairing the High Road from the Town of Shrewsbury, through Cressage, Harley, Much Wenlock, by Muckley Cross, and through Morville, to Bridgenorth, in the County of Salop.
Burlton and Llanymynech Turnpike Trust	1772	12 Geo. 3. c. 96	Salop Roads Act 1772; An Act for repairing, widening, and keeping in Repair, the Road from Burlton, in the County of Salop, through Knockin, to Llanymynech, in the same County; and from Knockin to the East End of the Llanriader Road; and from Place Carrick Lane to the Turnpike Road from Llanymynech to Oswestry near Cord Issa Mountain; and from Oswestry Turnpike Road on Knockin Heath, to the East End of Knockin Lane.
Cleobury Mortimer District Turnpike Trust			
Cleobury North and Ditton Priors Turnpike Trust	1825	6 Geo. 4. c. xlix	Roads from Bridgnorth to Cleobury Mortimer Act 1825; An Act for amending, maintaining and improving the Roads from Bridgnorth to Cleobury North, and also through Ditton Priors to the Brown Clee Hill, and from Cleobury Mortimer to several Places therein mentioned, and other Roads branching therefrom, in the Counties of Salop and Worcester.
Coalbrookdale and Wellington Turnpike Trust	1817	57 Geo. 3. c. xii	Madeley and Wellington Turnpike Road Act 1817; An Act for making and maintaining a Turnpike Road from and out of the Turnpike Road at the Bottom of Coalbrook Dale, in the Parish of Madeley, into the Turnpike Road leading from Shiffnall to Shrewsbury, at or near a Place called Watling Street, in the Parish of Wellington, all in the County of Salop.
Ellesmere District of Shrewsbury and Wrexham, and Harmer Hill Branch Turnpike Trust	1751	25 Geo. 2. c. 22	Shrewsbury and Wrexham Road Act 1751; An Act for repairing the Roads from the Town of Shrewsbury, through Ellesmere in the County of Salop, and Overton in the County of Flint, to Wrexham in the County of Denbigh.
Honington and Hilton Turnpike Trust	1763	3 Geo. 3. c. 59	Stafford, Sandon and Eccleshall Road Act 1763; An Act for repairing and widening the Road leading from the Town of Stafford to Sandon in the County of Stafford, and several other Roads in the Counties of Salop and Stafford.
Honington and Hilton Turnpike Trust	1823	4 Geo. 4. c. xlvii	Three Districts of Road in Staffordshire and Salop Act 1823; An Act for repairing and improving divers Roads in the Counties of Stafford and Salop, comprised in Three Districts called the Eccleshall, Newport and Watling Street District, the Newcastle and Eccleshall District, and the Hilton and Honnington District.
Ironbridge (Buildwas to Tern Bridges) Turnpike Trust; Leighton and Buildwas Turnpike Trust	1778	18 Geo. 3. c. 88	Salop Roads Act 1778; An Act for repairing and widening the Road from the Birches Brook to Buildwas Bridge, and from thence to join the Watling Street Turnpike Road at Tern Bridge, in the County of Salop.
Kelsall to Whiston Cross Turnpike Trust	1762	2 Geo. 3. c. 53	Salop and Stafford Roads Act 1762; An Act for repairing and widening the Roads leading from Kelsall in the County of Salop to Whiston Cross, and from thence; over Burnhill Green; Rudge Heath, by the Two New Inns, and to a Place called High Gate Warren in the County of Stafford.
King-Street Turnpike Trust	1797	37 Geo. 3. c. 172	Salop Roads Act 1797; An Act for amending, widening, altering, improving, and keeping in repair, the road leading from Atcham, through Condover to Dorrington; and also the road branching out of the said road, at a place called Allfield Turning, in the said parish of Condover, to the turnpike road leading from Shrewsbury to Ludlow, at a place called Hongerhill, in the same parish, all in the county of Salop.
Ludlow Turnpike Trust	1750	24 Geo. 2. c. 29	Ludlow and Monk's Bridge Road Act 1750; An Act for repairing the Road leading from the Town of Ludlow, in the County of Salop, through Wofferton and Little Hereford, to a Place called Monks Bridge, in the said County, and also from the said Town of Ludlow, to a Place or House called The Maidenhead, at Orleton, in the County of Hereford.
Madeley Turnpike Trust	1764	4 Geo. 3. c. 81	Salop Roads (No. 2) Act 1764; An Act for amending, widening, and keeping in Repair, several Roads leading from the Buck's Head at Watling Street to Beckbury and The New Inn, and from Birches Brook to the Hand Post in the Parish of Kemberton, in the County of Salop.
Marchwiaill, Bangor and Whitchurch Turnpike Trust; Whitchurch and Marchwiaill Turnpike Trust	1767	7 Geo. 3. c. 104	Denbigh, Flint, Salop and Chester Roads Act 1766; An Act for repairing and widening the Road from Marchwiel in the County of Denbigh through Bangor, Worthenbury, and Hanmer, in the County of Flint, to a House in the Possession of Thomas Jenks in Dodington in the Parish of Whitchurch in the County of Salop; and from Bangor aforesaid to Malpas in the County of Chester; and from Redbrook to Hampton in the said County of Salop.
Ministerley to Churchstoke Turnpike Trust	1834	4 & 5 Will. 4. c. xi	Minsterly and Churchstoke Turnpike Road (Salop., Montgomery) Act 1834; An Act for making a Turnpike Road from Minsterley in the County of Salop to the Turnpike Road leading from Bishop's Castle in the said County of Salop to Churchstoke in the County of Montgomery.
Much Wenlock to Church Stretton Turnpike Trust	1756	29 Geo. 2. c. 60	Much Wenlock Roads Act 1756; An Act for amending, widening, and keeping in Repair, several Roads, leading from the Markethouse in the Town of Much Wenlock, in the County of Salop.
Newport and Ternhill Turnpike Trust	1759	33 Geo. 2. c. 51	Chester to Birmingham Road Act 1759; An Act for repairing and widening the Road from the Bars at Boughton, within the Liberties of the City of Chester, to Whitchurch, and from thence to Newport in the County of Salop, to Ivetsey Bank in the County of Stafford, and from thence to Castle Bromwich and Stone Bridge in the Parish of Hampton on Arden, in the County of Warwick, and from Castle Bromwich to Birmingham in the same County.
Oswestry Turnpike Trust	1756	29 Geo. 2. c. 68	Denbigh Roads Act 1756; An Act for amending, widening, and keeping in Repair, the several Roads from the Town of Pool in the County of Montgomery, to Wrexham in the County of Denbigh, and also the Road from Knockin in the County of Salop to Llanrbaiader in Mochnant in the County of Denbigh.
Preston Brockhurst Turnpike Trust	1756	29 Geo. 2. c. 64	Shropshire Roads (No. 2) Act 1756; An Act for repairing and widening the Roads from the Town of Shrewsbury, to Preston Brockhurst, to Shawbury, and to Shreyhill, in the County of Salop.
Shawbury Turnpike Trust	1769	9 Geo. 3. c. 55	Salop Roads Act 1769; An Act for repairing and widening the Road from the End of the Turnpike Road in Shawbury, in the County of Salop, to Drayton in Hales, in the said County, and from thence to Newcastle under Line, in the County of Stafford; and from Shawbury aforesaid to the Turnpike Road in High Ercall, in the said County of Salop; and from Shawbury aforesaid to Wem, in the said County, and from thence to the Turnpike Road in Sandford, in the said County.
Shifnal District of Holyhead Road Turnpike Trust	1725	12 Geo. 1. c. 9	Shropshire Roads Act 1725; An Act for repairing the Roads therein mentioned, between Crackley Bank, in the Parish of Idsall, alias Shiffnall, and the Town of Shrewsbury, in the County of Salop.
Shrewsbury to Baschurch Turnpike Trust	1757	31 Geo. 2. c. 67	Shrewsbury, etc. Roads Act 1757; An Act for widening and repairing several Roads leading from The Welch Gate and Cotton Hill in the Town of Shrewsbury, in the County of Salop.
Shrewsbury to Bridgnorth Turnpike Trust	1751	25 Geo. 2. c. 49	Shropshire Roads Act 1751; An Act for repairing the High Road from the Town of Shrewsbury, through Cressage, Harley, Much Wenlock, by Muckley Cross, and through Morville, to Bridgenorth, in the County of Salop.
Shrewsbury to Church Stretton and Condover Turnpike Trust	1756	29 Geo. 2. c. 61	Shropshire Roads Act 1756; An Act for repairing and widening the Roads from Coleham Bridge in Shrewsbury, to the Market Place in Church Stretton, and to the Top of Lythwood Hill, and from Pulley Common to the May Pole in Condover, and from Coleham Bridge to Longdon, in the County of Salop.
Shrewsbury to Longden and Castle Pulverbach Turnpike Trust	1785	25 Geo. 3. c. 118	Salop, Radnor and Montgomery Roads Act 1785; An Act for continuing the Term and altering and enlarging the Powers of an Act made in the Eighth Year of His present Majesty, for amending and widening several Roads leading from the Town of Bishop's Castle and from Montgomery to the Turnpike Road at Westbury, and from Brockton to the Turnpike Road at Minsterley, in the several Counties of Salop, Radnor, and Montgomery; and for amending, widening, and keeping in Repair several other Roads in the Counties of Salop and Montgomery.
Shrewsbury to Minsterley Turnpike Trust	1757	31 Geo. 2. c. 67	Shrewsbury, etc. Roads Act 1757; An Act for widening and repairing several Roads leading from The Welch Gate and Cotton Hill in the Town of Shrewsbury, in the County of Salop.
Shrewsbury to Welshpool Turnpike Trust	1757	31 Geo. 2. c. 67	Shrewsbury, etc. Roads Act 1757; An Act for widening and repairing several Roads leading from The Welch Gate and Cotton Hill in the Town of Shrewsbury, in the County of Salop.
Shrewsbury to Westbury Turnpike Trust	1757	31 Geo. 2. c. 67	Shrewsbury, etc. Roads Act 1757; An Act for widening and repairing several Roads leading from The Welch Gate and Cotton Hill in the Town of Shrewsbury, in the County of Salop.
Wall under Heywood to Blackwood Turnpike Trust; Wall-under-Eyewood to Blackwood Turnpike Trust	1751	25 Geo. 2. c. 49	Shropshire Roads Act 1751; An Act for repairing the High Road from the Town of Shrewsbury, through Cressage, Harley, Much Wenlock, by Muckley Cross, and through Morville, to Bridgenorth, in the County of Salop.
Wall under Heywood to Blackwood Turnpike Trust; Wall-under-Eyewood to Blackwood Turnpike Trust	1765	5 Geo. 3. c. 86	Salop Roads Act 1765; An Act for enlarging the Term and Powers of an Act, made in the Twenty-fifth Year of the Reign of His late Majesty,[ax] for repairing the High Road from the Town of Shrewsbury, through Cressage, Harley, Much Wenlock, by Muckley Cross, and through Morville, to Bridgnorth, in the County of Salop; and for amending several other Roads near or adjoining thereto.
Watling Street, By Road Turnpike Trust	1764	4 Geo. 3. c. 81	Salop Roads (No. 2) Act 1764; An Act for amending, widening, and keeping in Repair, several Roads leading from the Buck's Head at Watling Street to Beckbury and The New Inn, and from Birches Brook to the Hand Post in the Parish of Kemberton, in the County of Salop.
Watling Street, Shrewsbury District and Branch Turnpike Trust	1725	12 Geo. 1. c. 9	Shropshire Roads Act 1725; An Act for repairing the Roads therein mentioned, between Crackley Bank, in the Parish of Idsall, alias Shiffnall, and the Town of Shrewsbury, in the County of Salop.
Watling Street, Wellington District Turnpike Trust	1725	12 Geo. 1. c. 9	Shropshire Roads Act 1725; An Act for repairing the Roads therein mentioned, between Crackley Bank, in the Parish of Idsall, alias Shiffnall, and the Town of Shrewsbury, in the County of Salop.
Welch Gate and Cotton Hill to Shrewsbury Turnpike Trust	1757	31 Geo. 2. c. 67	Shrewsbury, etc. Roads Act 1757; An Act for widening and repairing several Roads leading from The Welch Gate and Cotton Hill in the Town of Shrewsbury, in the County of Salop.
Wem Turnpike Trust; Wem to Sandford Turnpike Trust	1811	51 Geo. 3. c. xliv	Road from Wem and Whitchurch Road to Sandford and Hodnet Road Act 1811; An Act for making and maintaining a Road from the Wem and Whitchurch Road, to the Sandford and Hodnet Road, both in the County of Salop.
Wem to Bron y Garth Turnpike Trust	1771	11 Geo. 3. c. 95	Salop and Denbigh Roads Act 1771; An Act for repairing and widening the Road leading from Wem, in the County of Salop, to the Lime Rocks at Bron y Garth, and several other Roads in the Counties of Salop and Denbigh.
Wenlock Turnpike Trust	1778	18 Geo. 3. c. 89	Much Wenlock Roads Act 1778; An Act for enlarging the Term and Powers of an Act, made in the Twenty-ninth Year of the Reign of His late Majesty King George the Second, for amending, widening and keeping in Repair, several Roads leading from the Market House, in the Town of Much Wenlock, in the County of Salop; and for amending, widening and keeping in Repair, the Road leading from Gleeton Hill to Cressage, in the said County.
Whitchurch to Madeley etc Turnpike Trust	1767	7 Geo. 3. c. 92	Roads from Whitchurch and Hinstock Act 1766; An Act to repair and widen the Roads from Whitchurch in the County of Salop, to the Turnpike Road between Nantwich in the County of Chester and Newcastle under Line, and from Hinstock to Nantwich aforesaid.
Whitchurch to Ternhill Turnpike Trust	1759	33 Geo. 2. c. 51	Chester to Birmingham Road Act 1759; An Act for repairing and widening the Road from the Bars at Boughton, within the Liberties of the City of Chester, to Whitchurch, and from thence to Newport in the County of Salop, to Ivetsey Bank in the County of Stafford, and from thence to Castle Bromwich and Stone Bridge in the Parish of Hampton on Arden, in the County of Warwick, and from Castle Bromwich to Birmingham in the same County.

== Staffordshire ==
Staffordshire turnpike trusts
Trust	Founded	Acts of Parliament	
Trust	Founded	Citation	Title
Ashbourne to Leek and Congleton Turnpike Trust	1762	2 Geo. 3. c. 62	Stafford, Chester and Derby Roads Act 1762; An Act for repairing and widening the High Road leading from Ashborne in the County of Derby, to the Town of Leek in the County of Stafford, and from Ryecroft Gate upon Rushton Common to Congleton in the County of Chester, and also the Road leading from Blyth Marsh in the County of Stafford, through Cheadle, Oakamoor, and Blore, to the Turnpike Road from Ashborne to Buxton near Thorp in the County of Derby.
Ashby de la Zouch to Tutbury Turnpike Trust	1753	26 Geo. 2. c. 85	Leicester and Stafford Roads Act 1753; An Act for repairing the Road from Ashby de la Zouch in the County of Leicester, through Burton upon Trent in the County of Stafford, and to The Cock Inn in Tutbury in the said County.
Bilston Turnpike Trust	1766	6 Geo. 3. c. 95	Stafford Roads (No. 3) Act 1766; An Act for repairing and widening the Road leading from High Bullen in Wednesbury, to the further End of Darlaston Lane next the Portway; and from thence, through Bilston, to the further End of Gibbet Lane, and several other Roads leading to and from Bilston, in the County of Stafford.
Birmingham and Wednesbury Turnpike Trust	1726	13 Geo. 1. c. 14	Birmingham and Wednesbury Roads Act 1726; An Act for repairing the several Roads leading from Birmingham, through the Town of Wednesbury, to a Place called High Bullen, and to Great Bridge, and from thence to the End of Gibbet Lane adjoining to the Township of Bilson, and from Great Bridge, through Dudley, to King's Winsford, and to the further End of Brittell Lane, in the Counties of Warwick, Stafford, and Worcester.
Burton on Trent (Alrewas and Shenstone) Turnpike Trust	1762		
Burton on Trent to Abbots Bromley Turnpike Trust	1809	49 Geo. 3. c. cxlv	Road to Abbott's Bromley Act 1809; An Act for repairing and maintaining the Road from Burton upon Trent, in the County of Stafford, to Abbots Bromley, and from Bagots Bromley to the present Turnpike Road at or near Shirley Wich, in the said County.
Butterton, Warslow, Hartington and Longnor Turnpike Trust	1770	10 Geo. 3. c. 113	Stafford Roads Act 1770; An Act for repairing, widening, turning, and altering the Roads from Butterton Moor End, near Oncott, in the County of Stafford, to the Three Mile Stone in the Turnpike Road leading from Buxton to Ashborne, in the County of Derby; and from Blackton Moor, in the County of Stafford, to the Turnpike Road leading from Buxton to Ashbourne, near Newhaven, in the County of Derby; and from Warslow to Ecton Mine, in the County of Stafford.
Cheadle Turnpike Trust	1831	1 Will. 4. c. lxviii	Roads in the Neighbourhood of Cheadle Act 1831; An Act for consolidating the Trusts of the several Turnpike Roads in the Neighbourhood of Cheadle in the County of Stafford, and for making Deviations and new Branches to and from the same.
Cheadle to Butterton Moor Turnpike Trust	1769	9 Geo. 3. c. 80	Cheadle to Butterton Moor Road Act 1769; An Act for repairing and widening the Road from Cheadle to Botham House, and from thence to Butterton Moor End, in the County of Stafford.
Cheadle to Rocester Turnpike Trust	1799	39 Geo. 3. c. lxxv	Cheadle and Quickshill Bank and Bear's Brook and Rocester Roads Act 1799; An act for amending, widening, altering, and keeping in repair, the road leading from Cheadle, through Alveton, to the Uttoxeter and Ashborne turnpike road, at or near Quickhill Bank; and also the road leading from the Stone and Uttoxeter turnpike road, at Bear's Brook, through Hollington, to the said Uttoxeter and Ashborne turnpike road, at or near the Churnet Bridge at Rocester, in the county of Stafford, to continue in force for twenty-one years, and from thence to the end of the then next session of parliament.
Darlaston Turnpike Trust; (Tittensor Turnpike Trust)	1713	13 Ann. c. 31 (Note: Stated route: Roads between the Town or Village of Tittensor, and the most Northern Part of the Liberty of Talk on the Hill in Butland in the County of Stafford being about Eight computed Miles or thereabouts.) (Note: Trustees to meet in Newcastle-under-Lyme, first meeting at the Old Roe Buck Inn on 18 June 1714.) (Note: Tolls apply from 24 June 1714 for 21 years: until June 1715.)	Tittensor Turnpike Act 1713; An Act for repairing and amending the Highways, between the Town or Village of Tittensor, and the most Northern Part of Talke on the Hill, in Butlane, in the County of Stafford.
Darlaston Turnpike Trust; (Tittensor Turnpike Trust)	1713	8 Geo. 2. c. 5 (Note: Tolls extended for a further 21 years: until 1756.)	Tittensor Turnpike Act 1734; An Act for enlarging the Term and Powers granted by an Act made in the Twelfth and Thirteenth Year of the Reign of Her late Majesty Queen Anne, intituled, "An Act for repairing and amending the Highways between the Town or Village of Tittensor, and the most Northern Part of Talk on the Hill, in Butt Lane, in the County of Stafford."
Darlaston Turnpike Trust; (Tittensor Turnpike Trust)	1713	25 Geo. 2. c. 16 (Note: Tolls extended for a further 21 years: until 1777.)	Tittensor Turnpike Act 1751; An Act for enlarging the Term and Powers granted by Two Acts of Parliament, for repairing and amending the Highways between the Town or Village of Tittensor and the most Northern Part of Talk on the Hill, in Butt-Lane, in the County of Stafford.
Darlaston Turnpike Trust; (Tittensor Turnpike Trust)	1713	19 Geo. 3. c. 119	Darlaston Turnpike Act 1779; An Act for reducing into one Act of Parliament the several Laws now in force for repairing the Road leading from the Town or Village of Tittensor to the most Northern Part of Talk on the Hill, in Butt Lane, in the County of Stafford; and for repairing the Road from Darlastone Bridge, over Tittensor Heath, through the Town or Village of Tittensor aforesaid.
Darlaston Turnpike Trust; (Tittensor Turnpike Trust)	1713	31 Geo. 3. c. 129 (Note: Added a new branch, route: Branching out of, and leading from, the Tittensor Turnpike Road in the Parish of Stoke upon Trent, and the House of James Warner, standing upon the said Road, known by the Sign of the Black Lion, to Shelton Wharf, at or near Cliffe Gate Bank.)	Darlaston Turnpike Act 1791; An Act to enlarge the Term and Powers of an Act passed in the nineteenth Year of the Reign of His present Majesty, intituled, "An Act for reducing into one Act of Parliament the several Laws now in force for repairing the Road leading from the Town or Village of Tittensor, to the most Northern Part of Talk on the Hill, in Butt Lane, in the County of Stafford; and for repairing the Road from Darlastone Bridge over Tittensor Heath, through the Town or Village of Tittensor aforesaid;" and for making and keeping in Repair a Road branching out of the said Turnpike Road, near the House known by the Sign of The Black Lion, to, or nearly to Shelton Wharf, all in the Parish of Stoke upon Trent in the said County of Stafford.
Darlaston Turnpike Trust; (Tittensor Turnpike Trust)	1713	56 Geo. 3. c. xlix	Darlaston Turnpike Act 1816; An Act for enlarging the Term and Powers of Two Acts of His present Majesty, for repairing the Road from Darlastone Bridge to the most Northern Part of Talk-on-the-Hill in Butt Lane, in the County of Stafford, and also the Road branching out of the said first mentioned Road to Shelton Wharf, in the said County.
Darlaston Turnpike Trust; (Tittensor Turnpike Trust)	1713	4 Geo. 4. c. xxx	Darlaston Turnpike Act 1823; An Act for improving the Roads from Darlaston Bridge, through Newcastle under Lyme, to Butt Lane and Linley Lane, and from the Black Lion to Shelton Wharf, all in the County of Stafford.
Darlaston Turnpike Trust; (Tittensor Turnpike Trust)	1713	7 Will. 4 & 1 Vict. c. xl	Darlaston Turnpike Act 1837; An Act for more effectually improving the several Roads from Newcastle-under-Lyme to Darlaston Bridge, Butt Lane, and Linley Lane, and through Trent Vale and Stoke-upon-Trent to Shelton Wharf, all in the County of Stafford.
Darley Moor and Ellaston Turnpike Trust	1769	9 Geo. 3. c. 81	Darley Moor and Ellaston Road Act 1769; An Act for amending and widening the Road from the Town of Stone to Wordsley Green Gate, and from the West End of Bilston Street in Wolverhampton to The High Street opposite The Old Bush in Dudley, and from a Place called Burnt Tree, near Dudley, to Birmingham, and from the Market Cross in Wolverhampton to Cannock, in the Counties of Stafford, Worcester, and Warwick.
Dudley and Wolverhampton Turnpike Trust	1761	1 Geo. 3. c. 39	Stafford, Worcester and Warwick Roads Act 1760; An Act for amending and widening the Road from the Town of Stone to Wordsley Green Gate, and from the West End of Bilston Street in Wolverhampton to The High Street opposite The Old Bush in Dudley, and from a Place called Burnt Tree, near Dudley, to Birmingham, and from the Market Cross in Wolverhampton to Cannock, in the Counties of Stafford, Worcester, and Warwick.
Eccleshall, Newport and Watling Street Turnpike Trust	1763	3 Geo. 3. c. 59	Stafford, Sandon and Eccleshall Road Act 1763; An Act for repairing and widening the Road leading from the Town of Stafford to Sandon in the County of Stafford, and several other Roads in the Counties of Salop and Stafford.
Featherbed Lane Kings Bromley Turnpike Trust	1762	2 Geo. 2. c. 5	Lichfield Roads Act 1728; An Act for repairing the Roads leading from Cannals Gate to the City of Lichfield, and from the said City to Stone, and from thence to the End of the County of Stafford, in the Post Road towards Chester; and also from the Town of Burton upon Trent to the said City of Lichfield, and from thence to Wood End and Ogley Hay; and also from the said City of Lichfield to High Bridges, in the County of Stafford, and the County of the said City of Lichfield.
Filleybrook Lane Branch of Rugeley Stone and Stafford Turnpike Trust	1790	29 Geo. 3. c. 83	Stafford and Warwick Roads Act 1789; An Act for enlarging the Terms of Three Acts made in the Second, Seventeenth, and Twenty-eighth Years of His late Majesty, for repairing the Roads from Coleshill, through the City of Lichfield and the Town of Stone to the End of the County of Stafford, in the Road leading towards Chester, and several other Roads in the said Acts mentioned, in the Counties of Warwick and Stafford, and City and County of the City of Lichfield, and for making more effectual Provision for repairing and widening the said Roads, and other Roads therein mentioned, in the said County of Stafford.
Great Chell and Shelton Turnpike Trust	1770	10 Geo. 3. c. 66	Stafford and Cheshire Roads Act 1770; An Act for repairing and widening the Road from Tunstall, in the County, of Stafford, to Bosley, in the County of Chester; and from Great Chell to Shelton, in the said County of Stafford.
Handsworth Turnpike Trust	1809	49 Geo. 3. c. cxlvii	Road from Handsworth to Hamstead Bridge (Staffordshire) Act 1809; An Act for making and repairing a Road from Soho Hill, in the Parish of Handsworth, to the Walsall Turnpike Road, on the Northern Side of Hamstead Bridge; and also another Road from Brown's Green to a House called The Friary, all in the County of Stafford.
Hanley and Bucknall Turnpike Trust	1771	11 Geo. 3. c. 87	Staffordshire Roads (No. 2) Act 1771; An Act for repairing and widening the Road from Shelton to the Road between Cheadle and Leek, and from Bucknall to Weston Coyney, and from the Road between Cheadle and Leek to the Turnpike Road above Frogall Bridge, and from the same Road to the Road between Blyth Marsh and Thorp, at or near Ruchill Gate, in the County of Stafford.
High Bridges to Uttoxeter Turnpike Trust	1766	6 Geo. 3. c. 88	Stafford Roads (No. 2) Act 1766; An Act for repairing and widening the Road from High Bridges, in the County of Stafford, to Uttoxeter, and from Spath to Hanging Bridge, and from Tewnall's Lane to Yoxall Bridge, in the said County.
Lawton to Burslem and Newcastle Turnpike Trust	1763	3 Geo. 3. c. 45	Lawton, Burslem and Newcastle-under-Lyme Road Act 1763; An Act for repairing and widening the Road from Lawton in the County of Chester, to Burslem and Newcastle under Lyne in the County of Stafford; and other Roads therein mentioned.
Leek and Hassop, Middlehills and Buxton Turnpike Trust	1765	5 Geo. 3. c. 84	Stafford Roads Act 1765; An Act for repairing and widening the Road from Newcastle under Lyne to Hassop, and from Middle Hills to the Macclesfield Turnpike Road near Buxton; and also the Road branching out of the said first-mentioned Road at Cobridge to Burslem, and to the Uttoxeter Turnpike at Shelton, in the County of Stafford.
Lichfield Turnpike Trust	1789	29 Geo. 3. c. 83	Stafford and Warwick Roads Act 1789; An Act for enlarging the Terms of Three Acts made in the Second, Seventeenth, and Twenty-eighth Years of His late Majesty, for repairing the Roads from Coleshill, through the City of Lichfield and the Town of Stone to the End of the County of Stafford, in the Road leading towards Chester, and several other Roads in the said Acts mentioned, in the Counties of Warwick and Stafford, and City and County of the City of Lichfield, and for making more effectual Provision for repairing and widening the said Roads, and other Roads therein mentioned, in the said County of Stafford.
New Biddulph Turnpike Trust	1819	59 Geo. 3. c. lxxxvii	Biddulph and Dane-in-Shaw Road and Branch Act 1819; An Act for making and maintaining a Road from the Tunstall and Bosley Turnpike Road at Gillow Hollow, in the Parish of Biddulph, in the County of Stafford, to Park Lane, communicating with the Congleton and Leek Turnpike Road, near Dane-in-shaw Bridge in the County of Chester, with a Branch to the said Tunstall and Bosley Turnpike Road at Lich Lane, in the said Parish of Biddulph.
Newcastle and Eccleshall Turnpike Trust	1823	4 Geo. 4. c. xlvii	Three Districts of Road in Staffordshire and Salop Act 1823; An Act for repairing and improving divers Roads in the Counties of Stafford and Salop, comprised in Three Districts called the Eccleshall, Newport and Watling Street District, the Newcastle and Eccleshall District, and the Hilton and Honnington District.
Newcastle to Derby Turnpike Trust	1759	32 Geo. 2. c. 60	Derby to Newcastle-under-Lyne Road Act 1758; An Act for repairing and widening the Road from the Town of Derby to the Town of Newcastle under Lyne, in the County of Stafford.
Newcastle under Lyme and Drayton Turnpike Trust	1769	9 Geo. 3. c. 55	Salop Roads Act 1769; An Act for repairing and widening the Road from the End of the Turnpike Road in Shawbury, in the County of Salop, to Drayton in Hales, in the said County, and from thence to Newcastle under Line, in the County of Stafford; and from Shawbury aforesaid to the Turnpike Road in High Ercall, in the said County of Salop; and from Shawbury aforesaid to Wem, in the said County, and from thence to the Turnpike Road in Sandford, in the said County.
Newcastle under Lyme and Leek Turnpike Trust	1765	5 Geo. 3. c. 84	Stafford Roads Act 1765; An Act for repairing and widening the Road from Newcastle under Lyne to Hassop, and from Middle Hills to the Macclesfield Turnpike Road near Buxton; and also the Road branching out of the said first-mentioned Road at Cobridge to Burslem, and to the Uttoxeter Turnpike at Shelton, in the County of Stafford.
Newcastle under Lyme and Nantwich Turnpike Trust	1766	6 Geo. 3. c. 89	Stafford and Chester Roads Act 1766; An Act for repairing and widening the Road leading from the Bottom of Church Lane in the Town of Newcastle under Lane in the County of Stafford, to the Turnpike Road leading from Woor to Chester near the Town of Nantwich in the County of Chester, and from Chesterton through Alderley and Balterly to Ghorsly Hill.
Newport and Stonnall Turnpike Trust	1766	33 Geo. 2. c. 51	Chester to Birmingham Road Act 1759; An Act for repairing and widening the Road from the Bars at Boughton, within the Liberties of the City of Chester, to Whitchurch, and from thence to Newport in the County of Salop, to Ivetsey Bank in the County of Stafford, and from thence to Castle Bromwich and Stone Bridge in the Parish of Hampton on Arden, in the County of Warwick, and from Castle Bromwich to Birmingham in the same County.
Penkridge and Cannock Turnpike Trust	1827	7 Geo. 4. c. ix	Cannock and Penkridge Turnpike (Staffordshire) Act 1826; An Act for making and maintaining a Turnpike Road from Cannock in the County of Stafford to Penkridge in the same County.
Perry Bar to Birmingham Turnpike Trust	1831	1 Will. 4. c. xlvii	Perry Barr and Aston juxta Birmingham Turnpike Road Act 1831; An Act for making a Turnpike Road from the North Side of the Quarry House in the Township of Perry Barr in the County of Stafford to the Brook which divides the Parishes of Aston juxta Birmingham and Birmingham in the County of Warwick.
Rugeley and Alrewas Turnpike Trust	1824	5 Geo. 4. c. xlv	Rugeley and Alrewas Turnpike Road Act 1824; An Act for making and maintaining a Turnpike Road from Rugeley, through Armitage to Alrewas, with a Branch therefrom in the County of Stafford.
Rugeley and Stone Turnpike Trust	1728	2 Geo. 2. c. 5	Lichfield Roads Act 1728; An Act for repairing the Roads leading from Cannals Gate to the City of Lichfield, and from the said City to Stone, and from thence to the End of the County of Stafford, in the Post Road towards Chester; and also from the Town of Burton upon Trent to the said City of Lichfield, and from thence to Wood End and Ogley Hay; and also from the said City of Lichfield to High Bridges, in the County of Stafford, and the County of the said City of Lichfield.
Sandon, Hugbridge, Hilderstone etc. Turnpike Trust	1762	2 Geo. 3. c. 42	Stafford and Chester Roads Act 1762; An Act for repairing, widening, and altering, the Road from Sandon in the County of Stafford, to Bullock Smithy in the County of Chester; and from Hilderstone to Draycott in the Moors, and from Wetley Rocks to Tean in the said County of Stafford.
Soho Hill to Hamstead Bridge Turnpike Trust	1809	49 Geo. 3. c. cxlvii	Road from Handsworth to Hamstead Bridge (Staffordshire) Act 1809; An Act for making and repairing a Road from Soho Hill, in the Parish of Handsworth, to the Walsall Turnpike Road, on the Northern Side of Hamstead Bridge; and also another Road from Brown's Green to a House called The Friary, all in the County of Stafford.
Spath to Hanging Bridge Turnpike Trust	1766	6 Geo. 3. c. 88	Stafford Roads (No. 2) Act 1766; An Act for repairing and widening the Road from High Bridges, in the County of Stafford, to Uttoxeter, and from Spath to Hanging Bridge, and from Tewnall's Lane to Yoxall Bridge, in the said County.
Stafford, Church Bridge, Uttoxeter and Newport Turnpike Trust	1793	33 Geo. 3. c. 153	Stafford and Salop Roads Act 1793; An Act for repairing, widening, diverting, and improving the Road from Stafford to Church Bridge, and also the Road from Stafford to Uttoxeter, all in the County of Stafford, and also the Road from Stafford to Newport, in the County of Salop.
Stafford, Sandon, Eccleshall Turnpike Trust	1763	3 Geo. 3. c. 59	Stafford, Sandon and Eccleshall Road Act 1763; An Act for repairing and widening the Road leading from the Town of Stafford to Sandon in the County of Stafford, and several other Roads in the Counties of Salop and Stafford.
Stone, Lane End, Blythe Bridge etc. Turnpike Trust	1771	11 Geo. 3. c. 86	Staffordshire Roads Act 1771; An Act for repairing and widening the Road from Stone to Lane End, and to the Road between Leek and Sandon, on Meir Heath, and from thence to Blythe Bridge; and also from Meir to Trentham, and from thence to Stableford Bridge, in the County of Stafford.
Stone, Stafford and Penkridge Turnpike Trust	1760	1 Geo. 3. c. 39	Stafford, Worcester and Warwick Roads Act 1760; An Act for amending and widening the Road from the Town of Stone to Wordsley Green Gate, and from the West End of Bilston Street in Wolverhampton to The High Street opposite The Old Bush in Dudley, and from a Place called Burnt Tree, near Dudley, to Birmingham, and from the Market Cross in Wolverhampton to Cannock, in the Counties of Stafford, Worcester, and Warwick.
Stourbridge and Bridgnorth Turnpike Trust	1816	56 Geo. 3. c. xvi	Stourbridge and Bridgnorth Boundary Stone Road Act 1816; An Act for making and maintaining a Turnpike Road from the High Street in the Town of Stourbridge, in the County of Worcester, to the Boundary Stone between the Parish of Worfield and the Liberties of the Borough of Bridgnorth, in the County of Salop.
Streetway and Wordsley Green Turnpike Trust; Streetway and Wordsley Green and Wolverhampton Turnpike Trust	1760	1 Geo. 3. c. 39	Stafford, Worcester and Warwick Roads Act 1760; An Act for amending and widening the Road from the Town of Stone to Wordsley Green Gate, and from the West End of Bilston Street in Wolverhampton to The High Street opposite The Old Bush in Dudley, and from a Place called Burnt Tree, near Dudley, to Birmingham, and from the Market Cross in Wolverhampton to Cannock, in the Counties of Stafford, Worcester, and Warwick.
Sutton Coldfield to Walsall Turnpike Trust	1747	21 Geo. 2. c. 25	Wolverhampton Roads Act 1747; An Act for repairing the Roads leading from Sutton Colefield Common to the Town of Walsall, and from Sneals Green to Walsall, and from Walsall to Park Brook, which divides the Parishes of Wolverhampton and Walsall, and from Gibbet Lane to Wolverhampton, and from Compton to the End of the County of Stafford, and from Wolverhampton to The Wergs, and from thence to Shiffnal, and from The Wergs to Hales Heath, and from Wolverhampton to Cannock Wood, in the Road to Litchfield.
Tamworth Turnpike Trust; Tamworth to Lichfield Turnpike Trust	1770	10 Geo. 3. c. 99	Tamworth Roads Act 1770; An Act for repairing and widening several Roads leading to and through the Borough of Tamworth, and other Roads, therein mentioned, in the Counties of Stafford, Warwick, and Derby.
Tunstall and Bosley Turnpike Trust	1770	10 Geo. 3. c. 66	Stafford and Cheshire Roads Act 1770; An Act for repairing and widening the Road from Tunstall, in the County, of Stafford, to Bosley, in the County of Chester; and from Great Chell to Shelton, in the said County of Stafford.
Uttoxeter and Blythe Marsh Turnpike Trust	1823	4 Geo. 4. c. lix	Uttoxeter District of Roads Act 1823
Uttoxeter and Callingwood Plain Turnpike Trust	1809	49 Geo. 3. c. vi	Ashbourne and Yoxall, and Hatton Moor and Tutbury Roads and Branches Act 1809; An Act for enlarging the Term and Powers of Two Acts of His present Majesty, for repairing the Road from Ashbourn to Sudbury, and from Sudbury to Yoxall Bridge, and from Hatton Moor to Tutbury, in the Counties of Derby and Stafford, and for making Two new Branches of Road to communicate therewith.
Uttoxeter to Stoke and Stone Turnpike Trust	1793	33 Geo. 3. c. 131	Uttoxeter to Stoke Road Act 1793; An Act for amending, widening, altering, and keeping in Repair the Road leading from Uttoxeter to the Westwardly Part of Hardiwick Heath, and for setting out and making a new Road from thence to Stoke near Stone; and for amending, widening, altering, and keeping in Repair the Road leading from the Village of Millwich to Sandon, in the County of Stafford.
Walsall Turnpike Trust	1766	6 Geo. 3. c. 99	Stafford Roads (No. 4) Act 1766; An Act for repairing and widening the Road from Muckley Corner to Walsall and Wednesbury, and to Leigh Brook and Ocker Hill, and several other Roads, in the County of Stafford.
Walsall and Hamstead Turnpike Trust	1788	28 Geo. 3. c. 98	Stafford Roads Act 1788; An Act for amending, widening, turning, and keeping in Repair the Road leading from the Town of Walsall to Hamstead Bridge, and the Road leading from the said Town to a Common, called Sutton Coldfield, and the Road leading from the said Town to a certain Brook, called Park Brook, which divides the Parishes of Walsall and Wolverhampton, all in the County of Stafford.
Walton in Stone to Eccleshall Turnpike Trust	1792	32 Geo. 3. c. 157	Stafford Roads Act 1792; An Act for repealing an Act passed in the Eleventh Year of the Reign of His present Majesty, for repairing and widening the Road from Stone to Lane End, and to the Road between Leek and Sandon, on Meir Heath, and from Meir to Trentham, and from thence to Stableford, in the County of Stafford, and for granting other Powers for those Purposes; and for repairing and improving the Road from a Place called Walton, in Stone aforesaid, to Eccleshall, in the said County of Stafford.
West Bromwich to Sutton Coldfield Turnpike Trust	1804	44 Geo. 3. c. xl	West Bromwich and Sutton Coldfield Road Act 1804; An Act for amending and keeping in repair the road, from the Dudley turnpike road, near the house called The Swan Inn, in the parish of West Bromwich, in the county of Stafford, to the house called The Horse and Jockey, in the parish of Sutton Coldfield, in the county of Warwick.
Wolverhampton Turnpike Trust	1747	21 Geo. 2. c. 25	Wolverhampton Roads Act 1747; An Act for repairing the Roads leading from Sutton Colefield Common to the Town of Walsall, and from Sneals Green to Walsall, and from Walsall to Park Brook, which divides the Parishes of Wolverhampton and Walsall, and from Gibbet Lane to Wolverhampton, and from Compton to the End of the County of Stafford, and from Wolverhampton to The Wergs, and from thence to Shiffnal, and from The Wergs to Hales Heath, and from Wolverhampton to Cannock Wood, in the Road to Litchfield.
Wombourne, Sedgley to Bilston Turnpike Trust	1793	33 Geo. 3. c. 167	Stafford Roads (No. 2) Act 1793; An Act for amending, widening, and keeping in Repair the Roads leading from Wombourne to Prince's End, and from Gospel End to the Village of Over Penn, and from thence to the Turnpike Road leading from Wolverhampton to Stourbridge; and from Chitt's Grave to or near Prince's End; and from Can Lane to the Town of Bilston, in the County of Stafford.

== Warwickshire ==
Trust	Founded	Initial act	
Trust	Founded	Citation	Title
Alcester and Wootton Turnpike Trust	1814	54 Geo. 3. c. lxxxiv	Alcester to Birmingham and Stratford-upon-Avon Road at Woolton Wawen Act 1814; An Act for repairing the Road from Aulcester to Wootton Wawen, in the County of Warwick.
Allesley to Canwell Turnpike Trust	1830	11 Geo. 4 & 1 Will. 4. c. xx	Allesley and Canwell Gate Turnpike Road (Warwickshire, Staffordshire) Act 1830; An Act for making and maintaining a Turnpike Road from Pickford Brook, in the Parish of Allesley, in the County of Warwick, to Canwell Gate, in the County of Stafford.
Ansley and Whitacre Turnpike Trust	1762	2 Geo. 3. c. 69	Hinckley and Coventry Road Act 1762; An Act for explaining and amending so much of Two Acts of the Twenty-seventh and Twenty-ninth Years of His late Majesty, for repairing several Roads therein mentioned, in the Counties of Leicester and Warwick, as relates to the Road between Hinckley and Coventry.
Arrow, Pot Hook's End, Dunnington and Crabb's Cross Turnpike Trust	1826	7 Geo. 4. c. xxiii	Arrow and Pot Hooks End, and Dunnington and Crabs Cross Roads (Warwickshire and Worcestershire) Act 1826; An Act for making and maintaining a Turnpike Road from Arrow in the County of Warwick to Pot Hooks End in the County of Worcester, and from Dunnington in the said County of Warwick to Crabs Cross in the said County of Worcester.
Bentley Branch Turnpike Trust	1762	2 Geo. 3. c. 80	Leicester, Warwick and Coventry Roads Act 1762; An Act for amending, widening, and keeping in Repair, several Roads therein mentioned, lying in the Counties of Leicester and Warwick, and in the County of the City of Coventry.
Bentley Lane Turnpike Trust	1762	2 Geo. 3. c. 80	Leicester, Warwick and Coventry Roads Act 1762; An Act for amending, widening, and keeping in Repair, several Roads therein mentioned, lying in the Counties of Leicester and Warwick, and in the County of the City of Coventry.
Birmingham to Blakedown Pool Turnpike Trust	1753	26 Geo. 2. c. 47	Hagley and Birmingham Road Act 1753; An Act for repairing and widening several Roads leading from the Market House in Stourbridge, and other Roads therein mentioned, in the Counties of Worcester, Stafford, Salop, and Warwick, respectively.
Birmingham to Stonebridge Turnpike Trust	1744	18 Geo. 2. c. 19	Warwickshire Roads Act 1744; An Act for repairing the Road from Birmingham, in the County of Warwick (through Elmdon), to a Lane leading by the End of Stone Bridge, in the said County.
Birmingham to Stratford Turnpike Trust	1725	12 Geo. 1. c. 6	Birmingham to Edgehill Road Act 1725; An Act for repairing the Roads leading from Birmingham, through Warwick, to Warmington, and from Birmingham, through Stratford upon Avon, to Edghill, in the County of Warwick.
Birmingham to Watford Gap Turnpike Trust	1807	47 Geo. 3 Sess. 2. c. x	Birmingham and Shenstone Road Act 1807; An Act or making and maintaining a Road from Birmingham, in the County of Warwick, to join the Lichfield Turnpike Road, in the Parish of Shenstone, in the County of Stafford, and for making a Branch of Road to communicate therewith.
Birmingham, Warwick and Warmington Turnpike Trust	1725	12 Geo. 1. c. 6	Birmingham to Edgehill Road Act 1725; An Act for repairing the Roads leading from Birmingham, through Warwick, to Warmington, and from Birmingham, through Stratford upon Avon, to Edghill, in the County of Warwick.
Broad Campden Hill to Halford Bridge Turnpike Trust	1817	57 Geo. 3. c. v	Road from Cross Hands to Halford Bridge Act 1817; An Act for repairing the Road from the Cross Hands, on the Worcester and Oxford Turnpike Road, to Halford Bridge, and other Roads therein mentioned, in the Counties of Gloucester, Warwick and Worcester.
Castle Bromwich and Birmingham Turnpike Trust	1759	33 Geo. 2. c. 51	Chester to Birmingham Road Act 1759; An Act for repairing and widening the Road from the Bars at Boughton, within the Liberties of the City of Chester, to Whitchurch, and from thence to Newport in the County of Salop, to Ivetsey Bank in the County of Stafford, and from thence to Castle Bromwich and Stone Bridge in the Parish of Hampton on Arden, in the County of Warwick, and from Castle Bromwich to Birmingham in the same County.
Coventry Turnpike Trust	1812	52 Geo. 3. c. lvii	Roads through Coventry Act 1812; An Act for improving the Public Roads in and through the City of Coventry.
Coventry and Over Whiteacre Turnpike Trust; Fillongley and Over Whiteacre Turnpike Trust	1762	2 Geo. 3. c. 69	Hinckley and Coventry Road Act 1762; An Act for explaining and amending so much of Two Acts of the Twenty-seventh and Twenty-ninth Years of His late Majesty, for repairing several Roads therein mentioned, in the Counties of Leicester and Warwick, as relates to the Road between Hinckley and Coventry.
Coventry and Stoney Stanton Turnpike Trust	1831	1 & 2 Will. 4. c. xl	Coventry and Stoney Stanton Turnpike Road Act 1831; An Act for making and maintaining a Turnpike Road from the City of Coventry to Stoney Stanton in the County of Leicester, to unite with the present Turnpike Road there leading through Narborough to the Borough of Leicester.
Coventry and Warwick Turnpike Trust; Warwick, Coventry and Leamington Turnpike Trust	1754	27 Geo. 2. c. 42	Leicester and Warwick Roads Act 1754; An Act for repairing and widening the Road from Leicester to Narborough, and from Leicester to Coventry, and from thence through Kenilworth to Warwick, and from thence to Halford Bridge, and from Warwick to Stratford upon Avon, and from Coventry to Martyn's Gutter, leading towards Stoneleigh Town; and for supplying an Omission in an Act passed in the last Session of Parliament, for repairing the Road from Leicester to Ashby de la Zouch, in the County of Leicester.
Coventry and Wolvey Turnpike Trust	1813	53 Geo. 3. c. vi	Road from Coventry to Rugby Act 1813; An Act for repairing the Road from the City of Coventry to the Rugby Turnpike Road, in the Parish of Wolvey, in the County of Warwick.
Dunchurch and Southam Turnpike Trust	1794	34 Geo. 3. c. 128	Dunchurch to Southam Road Act 1794; An act for amending, widening, altering, and keeping in repair, the road from Dunchurch to Southam, in the county of Warwick.
Dunchurch and Stonebridge Turnpike Trust	1723	10 Geo. 1. c. 15	Warwick Roads Act 1723; An Act for repairing the Road leading from Dunchurch, in the County of Warwick, to the Bottom of Meriden Hill, in the same County.
Evesham and Alcester Turnpike Trust	1778	18 Geo. 3. c. 93	Evesham Roads Act 1778; An Act for repealing certain Parts of Three several Acts of Parliament of the First, the Seventeenth, and the Thirtieth Years of the Reign of His late Majesty King George the Second, made for repairing several Roads leading to and from the Borough of Evesham, in the County of Worcester; and for repairing and widening the Road from Evesham Bridge in the said Borough, to the Globe Inn, in Alcester, in the County of Warwick.
Finford Bridge and Banbury Turnpike Trust	1755	28 Geo. 2. c. 46	Warwick and Oxford Roads Act 1755; An Act for repairing and widening the Roads leading from the Cross of Hand near Finford Bridge in the County of Warwick, through the Town of Southam in the same County, to the Borough of Banbury in the County of Oxford; and from The Guide Post in the Village of Adderbury in the same County, through Kidlington, to the Mile Way leading towards the City of Oxford; and also the Road leading from a Place called The Two Mile Tree near the City of Oxford, over Gosford otherwise Gossard Bridge, to a certain Gate entering upon Weston on the Green in the said County.
Hatton Turnpike Trust			
Hinckley and Coventry Turnpike Trust	1754	27 Geo. 2. c. 42	Leicester and Warwick Roads Act 1754; An Act for repairing and widening the Road from Leicester to Narborough, and from Leicester to Coventry, and from thence through Kenilworth to Warwick, and from thence to Halford Bridge, and from Warwick to Stratford upon Avon, and from Coventry to Martyn's Gutter, leading towards Stoneleigh Town; and for supplying an Omission in an Act passed in the last Session of Parliament, for repairing the Road from Leicester to Ashby de la Zouch, in the County of Leicester.
Mancetter to Wolvey Heath Turnpike Trust	1762	2 Geo. 3. c. 69	Hinckley and Coventry Road Act 1762; An Act for explaining and amending so much of Two Acts of the Twenty-seventh and Twenty-ninth Years of His late Majesty, for repairing several Roads therein mentioned, in the Counties of Leicester and Warwick, as relates to the Road between Hinckley and Coventry.
Northfield to Wootton Turnpike Trust	1767	7 Geo. 3. c. 68	Worcester and Warwick Roads Act 1766; An Act for amending and widening the Road leading from The Bell Inn at Northfield in the County of Worcester, to the Wootton Turnpike in the great Turnpike Road leading from Stratford upon Avon in the County of Warwick, to Birmingham in the same County.
Rugby to Hinckley Turnpike Trust	1812	52 Geo. 3. c. lxxxii	Rugby Bridge and Hinckley Road Act 1812; An Act for repairing and widening the Road from Rugby Bridge, in the County of Warwick, to the Town of Hinckley, in the County of Leicester.
Rugby to Kilworth Turnpike Trust	1801	41 Geo. 3. (U.K.). c. lxxxiii	Road from Rugby to the Lutterworth and Market Harborough Turnpike Road Act 1801; An act for repairing and widening the road from the town of Rugby in the county of Warwick, to join the turnpike road leading from Lutterworth to Market Harborough in the counties of Leicester and Northampton.
Rugby to Lutterworth Turnpike Trust	1785	25 Geo. 3. c. 115	Warwick Roads Act 1785; An Act for repairing and widening the Roads leading from the Gibbet or Lutterworth Hand on the Watling Street Road through the Parishes of Churchover, Brownsover, Newbold upon Avon, Rugby, and Bilton in the County of Warwick, to the Turnpike Road between Dunchurch and Hillmorton in the said County, at or near a Public House known by the Sign of the Cock, in the said Parish of Bilton.
Rugby to Warwick Turnpike Trust	1818	58 Geo. 3. c. xxxii	Rugby and Warwick Road Act 1818; An Act for repairing and widening the Road from the Town of Rugby, in the County of Warwick, to the Borough of Warwick, in the same County.
Southam to Kineton Turnpike Trust	1852	15 & 16 Vict. c. lv	Southam and Kineton Turnpike Road Act 1852; An Act for the Establishment of a Turnpike Road from Southam to Kineton, both in the County of Warwick.
Spernal Ash Turnpike Trust; Birmingham and Spernal Ash Turnpike Trust	1767	7 Geo. 3. c. 77	Warwick Roads Act 1766; An Act for repairing and widening the Road from Spernal Ash in the County of Warwick, through Studley, to a Street called Digbeth, in the Town of Birmingham.
Stonebridge to Kenilworth Turnpike Trust	1772	12 Geo. 3. c. 91	Warwick Roads Act 1772; An Act for repairing and widening the Road from the Warwick Road, near Solihull, to the Guide Post in Kenilworth; and from Stone Bridge to meet the aforesaid Road on Balsall Common, in the County of Warwick.
Stratford to Bromsgrove Turnpike Trust	1754	27 Geo. 2. c. 36	Warwick and Worcester Roads Act 1754; An Act for repairing and widening the Roads from the Borough of Stratford upon Avon, in the County of Warwick, through Alcester in the said County and Feckenham, to a Place called Bradley Brook, in the County of Worcester, and from Alcester through Great Coughton and Crabbs Cross, in the said County of Warwick, and through Hewell Lane and Burcott, to the Cross of Hands on a Common called The Leekhay, and out of Hewell Lane, through Church Lane and Tutnell, to Bromsgrove in the said County of Worcester.
Stratford to Edgehill Turnpike Trust	1725	12 Geo. 1. c. 6	Birmingham to Edgehill Road Act 1725; An Act for repairing the Roads leading from Birmingham, through Warwick, to Warmington, and from Birmingham, through Stratford upon Avon, to Edghill, in the County of Warwick.
Stratford to Long Compton Turnpike Trust	1729	3 Geo. 2. c. 9	Warwick Roads Act 1729; An Act for repairing the Road leading from a Gate called Shipston Toll Gate, at Bridgtown, in the Parish of Old Stratford, in the County of Warwick, through Alderminster and Shipston upon Stower, to the Top of Long Compton Hill, in the said County.
Upton, Great Kington and Wellesbourne Turnpike Trust	1770	10 Geo. 3. c. 63	Upton, Great Kington and Wellesbourne Hastings Road Act 1770; An Act for repairing and widening the Road from Upton, in the Parish of Ratley, to the North End of Bridge Street in the Town of Great Kington, and from thence to the Guide Post at the Town of Wellesbourne Hastings, in the County of Warwick.
Warwick to Paddle Brook and Stratford Turnpike Trust	1754	27 Geo. 2. c. 42	Leicester and Warwick Roads Act 1754; An Act for repairing and widening the Road from Leicester to Narborough, and from Leicester to Coventry, and from thence through Kenilworth to Warwick, and from thence to Halford Bridge, and from Warwick to Stratford upon Avon, and from Coventry to Martyn's Gutter, leading towards Stoneleigh Town; and for supplying an Omission in an Act passed in the last Session of Parliament, for repairing the Road from Leicester to Ashby de la Zouch, in the County of Leicester.
Watling Street Turnpike Trust	1762	2 Geo. 3. c. 80	Leicester, Warwick and Coventry Roads Act 1762; An Act for amending, widening, and keeping in Repair, several Roads therein mentioned, lying in the Counties of Leicester and Warwick, and in the County of the City of Coventry.
Wellesbourne and Stratford Turnpike Trust	1770	10 Geo. 3. c. 94	Wellesbourne Mountfort and Stratford-upon-Avon Road Act 1770; An Act for amending the Road from Wells-bourn Mountfort to Stratford upon Avon, in the County of Warwick.

== Worcestershire ==
Trust	Founded	Initial act	
Trust	Founded	Citation	Title
Birmingham to Bromsgrove Turnpike Trust	1726	13 Geo. 1. c. 15	Bromsgrove and Birmingham Roads Act 1726; An Act for repairing the Roads leading from the Town of Bromsgrove to the Town of Dudley, in the County of Worcester, and from the said Town of Bromsgrove to the Town of Birmingham, in the County of Warwick.
Dog Lane Gate (Bewdley) Turnpike Trust	1753	26 Geo. 2. c. 39	Bewdley Roads Act 1753; An Act for repairing and widening several Roads leading from the Town of Bewdley, in the County of Worcester, to the several Places therein mentioned, in the Counties of Worcester and Salop respectively.
Droitwich Turnpike Trust	1713	13 Ann. c. 27	Worcester Highways Act 1713; An Act for repairing the Highway, or Road, from the City of Worcester, to the Borough of Droitwich, in the County of Worcester.
Dudley and Brettell Lane Turnpike Trust	1726	13 Geo. 1. c. 14	Birmingham and Wednesbury Roads Act 1726; An Act for repairing the several Roads leading from Birmingham, through the Town of Wednesbury, to a Place called High Bullen, and to Great Bridge, and from thence to the End of Gibbet Lane adjoining to the Township of Bilson, and from Great Bridge, through Dudley, to King's Winsford, and to the further End of Brittell Lane, in the Counties of Warwick, Stafford, and Worcester.
Dudley and Brettell Lane Turnpike Trust	1787	27 Geo. 3. c. 82	Stafford and Worcester Roads Act 1787; An Act for continuing and amending three Acts of the Thirteenth Year of King George the First, the Twenty-first Year of His late Majesty, and the Twelfth Year of His present Majesty, so far as the same relate to the Roads from a Place called the Nether Trindle near Dudley, to Kingswinford, and to the further End of Brittel Lane, within the Counties of Stafford and Worcester, and for making and keeping in repair a Road from or near to the Nether Trindle aforesaid, to Tipton Green in the said Counties.
Dudley and New Inn Turnpike Trust	1790	30 Geo. 3. c. 102	Worcester Salop and Stafford Roads Act 1790; An Act for making, amending, widening, and keeping in Repair, a Road from Eve Hill near Dudley, to the New Inn, in the Parish of Pattingham, and from the Turnpike Road at or near Street End, in the Parish of Kingswinford, to the Turnpike Road leading from Dudley to Wolverhampton, in the Counties of Worcester, Salop, and Stafford.
Dudley and Pedmore Turnpike Trust	1762	2 Geo. 3. c. 78	Worcester and Salop Roads Act 1762; An Act for amending and widening the Road from the Market-House in Stourbridge, to Colly Gate in Cradley, and from Pedmore to Holly Hall, and from Colley Gate to Halesowen, and from the Turnpike Road on Dudley Wood to Rednal Green in the Parish of King's Norton, and from Carter's Lane to The Bell Inn at Northfield, in the Counties of Worcester, Stafford, and Salop.
Dudley and Rowley Regis Turnpike Trust	1762	2 Geo. 3. c. 78	Worcester and Salop Roads Act 1762; An Act for amending and widening the Road from the Market-House in Stourbridge, to Colly Gate in Cradley, and from Pedmore to Holly Hall, and from Colley Gate to Halesowen, and from the Turnpike Road on Dudley Wood to Rednal Green in the Parish of King's Norton, and from Carter's Lane to The Bell Inn at Northfield, in the Counties of Worcester, Stafford, and Salop.
Dudley, Halesowen and Bromsgrove Turnpike Trust; Dudley and Halesowen Turnpike Trust	1726	13 Geo. 1. c. 15	Bromsgrove and Birmingham Roads Act 1726; An Act for repairing the Roads leading from the Town of Bromsgrove to the Town of Dudley, in the County of Worcester, and from the said Town of Bromsgrove to the Town of Birmingham, in the County of Warwick.
Dudley, Halesowen and Bromsgrove Turnpike Trust; Dudley and Halesowen Turnpike Trust	1816	56 Geo. 3. c. lxvii	Road from Bromsgrove to Dudley Act 1816; An Act for enlarging the Term and Powers of certain Acts for repairing several Roads in the Counties of Worcester and Warwick, so far as relate to the Road leading from the Town of Bromsgrove to the Town of Dudley, in the County of Worcester, and for making a more commodious Road near the Town of Dudley.
Evesham and Alcester Turnpike Trust	1778	18 Geo. 3. c. 93	Evesham Roads Act 1778; An Act for repealing certain Parts of Three several Acts of Parliament of the First, the Seventeenth, and the Thirtieth Years of the Reign of His late Majesty King George the Second, made for repairing several Roads leading to and from the Borough of Evesham, in the County of Worcester; and for repairing and widening the Road from Evesham Bridge in the said Borough, to the Globe Inn, in Alcester, in the County of Warwick.
Evesham Turnpike Trust	1727	1 Geo. 2. St. 2. c. 11	Evesham Roads Act 1727; An Act for repairing and amending several Roads leading to and from the Borough of Evesham, in the County of Worcester.
Evesham Second District Turnpike Trust	1727	1 Geo. 2. St. 2. c. 11	Evesham Roads Act 1727; An Act for repairing and amending several Roads leading to and from the Borough of Evesham, in the County of Worcester.
Hatton to Bromsgrove Turnpike Trust	1767	7 Geo. 3. c. 81	Warwick and Worcester Roads Act 1766; An Act for repairing and widening the Road from the Turnpike Road at Hatton near the Borough of Warwick through King's Norton in the County of Worcester, and to the upper End of Gannow Green in the Parish of Bromsgrove, and to The Bell Inn in the Parish of Bell Broughton in the said County of Worcester.
Hundred House Turnpike Trust	1753	26 Geo. 2. c. 50	Worcester Roads Act 1753; An Act for repairing and widening the Roads leading from Redstone Ferry, in the County of Worcester, to The Hundred House, and from thence to Monks Bridge, in the Road to the Town of Tenbury; and from the said Hundred House to the said Town of Tenbury, in the said County.
Inning's Lane (from Kidderminster) Turnpike Trust; Inning's Lane Turnpike Trust	1777	17 Geo. 3. c. 75	Kidderminster Roads Act 1777; An Act to repeal an Act of the Thirty-third year of His late Majesty, for amending, widening, and keeping in Repair several Roads leading from the Market-house, in the Town of Kidderminster, in the County of Worcester; and also to repeal so much of Two Acts of the Tenth of His late Majesty, and the Seventh of His present Majesty, as relate to the Road from The Mitre Oak to a Farm House called Goodness, and from Titton Brook to the Hamlet of Wribbenhall, in the said County; and to discontinue the Powers of an Act of the Eighth of His present Majesty, so far as relate to the Road from the Cross of the Hands near Goodness Farm, to a Place called The Spout; and for more effectually amending, widening, and keeping in Repair the several Roads described in the first-mentioned Act, and also several other Roads therein mentioned.
Kidderminster Turnpike Trust	1759	33 Geo. 2. c. 50	Worcester Roads Act 1759; An Act for amending, widening, and keeping in Repair, several Roads leading from the Market House in the Town of Kidderminster, in the County of Worcester.
Mickleton and Broadway and Chipping Campden Turnpike Trust; Mickleton and Broadway Turnpike Trust	1824	5 Geo. 4. c. xxviii	Broadway and Mickleton Road Act 1824; An Act for repairing the Road leading from the Worcester Turnpike Road, in the Village of Broadway in the County of Worcester, to the Stratford-upon-Avon Turnpike Road, in the Village of Mickleton in the County of Gloucester.
Overbury to London Road Turnpike Trust			
Pershore Turnpike Trust; Birmingham, Redditch and Pershore Turnpike Trust	1825	6 Geo. 4. c. cxlii	Birmingham and Pershore Turnpike Road Act 1825; An Act for making and maintaining a Turnpike Road from the Town of Birmingham to or near the Town of Pershore.
Stourbridge Turnpike Trust	1753	26 Geo. 2. c. 47	Hagley and Birmingham Road Act 1753; An Act for repairing and widening several Roads leading from the Market House in Stourbridge, and other Roads therein mentioned, in the Counties of Worcester, Stafford, Salop, and Warwick, respectively.
Stourbridge to Worfield Turnpike Trust	1816	56 Geo. 3. c. xvi	Stourbridge and Bridgnorth Boundary Stone Road Act 1816; An Act for making and maintaining a Turnpike Road from the High Street in the Town of Stourbridge, in the County of Worcester, to the Boundary Stone between the Parish of Worfield and the Liberties of the Borough of Bridgnorth, in the County of Salop.
Tenbury Turnpike Trust	1757	30 Geo. 2. c. 38	Tenbury Roads Act 1757; An Act for amending, widening, and keeping in Repair, several Roads, in and near to the Town of Tenbury, in the Counties of Salop, Worcester, and Hereford.
Tinker's Gate (Bewdley) Turnpike Trust	1753	26 Geo. 2. c. 39	Bewdley Roads Act 1753; An Act for repairing and widening several Roads leading from the Town of Bewdley, in the County of Worcester, to the several Places therein mentioned, in the Counties of Worcester and Salop respectively.
Upton-upon-Severn Turnpike Trust	1751	25 Geo. 2. c. 60	Worcestershire Roads Act 1751; An Act for repairing and amending the several Roads leading from the West End of Upon Bridge in the County of Worcester, to the Parish of Tirley in the County of Gloucester, and to the Parish of Colwall in the County of Hereford, and to the further Side of a Place called The Rid Green in the Road to the City of Worcester, and through a Place called Roberts End Street to Malvern Chace in the said County of Worcester.
Welch Gate (Bewdley) Turnpike Trust	1753	26 Geo. 2. c. 39	Bewdley Roads Act 1753; An Act for repairing and widening several Roads leading from the Town of Bewdley, in the County of Worcester, to the several Places therein mentioned, in the Counties of Worcester and Salop respectively.
Worcester Turnpike Trust	1725	12 Geo. 1. c. 14	Worcester Roads Act 1725; An Act for repairing several Roads therein mentioned, leading into the City of Worcester.
