= List of acts of the Parliament of Great Britain from 1740 =

This is a complete list of acts of the Parliament of Great Britain for the year 1740.

For acts passed until 1707, see the list of acts of the Parliament of England and the list of acts of the Parliament of Scotland. See also the list of acts of the Parliament of Ireland.

For acts passed from 1801 onwards, see the list of acts of the Parliament of the United Kingdom. For acts of the devolved parliaments and assemblies in the United Kingdom, see the list of acts of the Scottish Parliament, the list of acts of the Northern Ireland Assembly, and the list of acts and measures of Senedd Cymru; see also the list of acts of the Parliament of Northern Ireland.

The number shown after each act's title is its chapter number. Acts are cited using this number, preceded by the year(s) of the reign during which the relevant parliamentary session was held; thus the Union with Ireland Act 1800 is cited as "39 & 40 Geo. 3. c. 67", meaning the 67th act passed during the session that started in the 39th year of the reign of George III and which finished in the 40th year of that reign. Note that the modern convention is to use Arabic numerals in citations (thus "41 Geo. 3" rather than "41 Geo. III"). Acts of the last session of the Parliament of Great Britain and the first session of the Parliament of the United Kingdom are both cited as "41 Geo. 3".

Acts passed by the Parliament of Great Britain did not have a short title; however, some of these acts have subsequently been given a short title by acts of the Parliament of the United Kingdom (such as the Short Titles Act 1896).

Before the Acts of Parliament (Commencement) Act 1793 came into force on 8 April 1793, acts passed by the Parliament of Great Britain were deemed to have come into effect on the first day of the session in which they were passed. Because of this, the years given in the list below may in fact be the year before a particular act was passed.

== 14 Geo. 2 ==
The seventh session of the 8th Parliament of Great Britain, which met from 18 November 1740 until 25 April 1741.

This session was also traditionally cited as 14 G. 2.

=== Public acts ===
Short title	Citation	Royal assent
Long title
Land Tax Act 1740 (repealed)	14 Geo. 2. c. 1	18 December 1740
An Act for granting an Aid to His Majesty, by a Land Tax, to be raised in Great Britain, for the Service of the Year One Thousand Seven Hundred and Forty-one. (Repealed by Statute Law Revision Act 1867 (30 & 31 Vict. c. 59))
Taxation Act 1740 (repealed)	14 Geo. 2. c. 2	21 March 1741
An Act for continuing the Duties upon Malt, Mum, Cyder, and Perry, in that Part of Great Britain called England; and for granting to His Majesty certain Duties upon Malt, Mum, Cyder, and Perry, in that Part of Great Britain called Scotland; for the Service of the Year One Thousand Seven Hundred and Forty-one. (Repealed by Statute Law Revision Act 1867 (30 & 31 Vict. c. 59))
Exportation Act 1740 (repealed)	14 Geo. 2. c. 3	21 March 1741
An Act to prohibit for a Time therein limited the Exportation of Corn, Grain (Rice excepted), Meal, Malt, Flour, Bread, Biscuit, Starch, Beef, Pork, and Bacon. (Repealed by Statute Law Revision Act 1867 (30 & 31 Vict. c. 59))
Licence to Joseph Porter, etc., to Import Silk Act 1740 (repealed)	14 Geo. 2. c. 4	21 March 1741
An Act to empower Joseph Porter, James Bourdieu, and Abraham Desmarette, to import a certain Quantity of Raw Silk, of the Growth of Spain, from Leghorn. (Repealed by Statute Law Revision Act 1948 (11 & 12 Geo. 6. c. 62))
Nether Knutsford Church Act 1740	14 Geo. 2. c. 5	21 March 1741
An Act for making the Chapelry of Nether Knutsford, in the Parish of Rosthern, and County of Chester, a separate and distinct Parish; and for erecting a Parish Church therein, endowing the same, settling the Right of Presentation thereto, and other Purposes.
Cattle Stealing Act 1740 (repealed)	14 Geo. 2. c. 6	21 March 1741
An Act to render the Laws more effectual, for preventing the stealing and destroying of Sheep and other Cattle. (Repealed for England and Wales by Criminal Statutes Repeal Act 1827 (7 & 8 Geo. 4. c. 27) and for India by Criminal Law (India) Act 1828 (9 Geo. 4. c. 74))
Importation into Scotland Act 1740 (repealed)	14 Geo. 2. c. 7	21 March 1741
An Act for licensing the Importation of Victual from Ireland, and other Parts beyond the Seas, into Scotland, in Time of Dearth and Scarcity. (Repealed by Statute Law Revision Act 1867 (30 & 31 Vict. c. 59))
River Dee Navigation Act 1740	14 Geo. 2. c. 8	21 March 1741
An Act for incorporating the Undertakers of the Navigation of the River Dee.
Mutiny Act 1740 (repealed)	14 Geo. 2. c. 9	21 March 1741
An Act for punishing Mutiny and Desertion; and for the better Payment of the Army and their Quarters. (Repealed by Statute Law Revision Act 1867 (30 & 31 Vict. c. 59))
Small Debts (London) Act 1740 (repealed)	14 Geo. 2. c. 10	21 March 1741
An Act to explain and amend an Act made in the Third Year of the Reign of King James the First, intituled, "An Act for the recovering of small Debts, and for the relieving of poor Debtors, in London." (Note: City of London Court of Conscience Act 1605 (3 Jas. 1. c. 15)) (Repealed by City of London Court of Requests Act 1835 (5 & 6 Will. 4. c. xciv))
Gloucester Water Supply Act 1740 (repealed)	14 Geo. 2. c. 11	21 March 1741
An Act for supplying the City of Gloucester with fresh Water. (Repealed by Gloucester Waterworks Act 1855 (18 & 19 Vict. c. lxxxix))
Kent and Sussex Roads Act 1740 (repealed)	14 Geo. 2. c. 12	21 March 1741
An Act for enlarging the Terms and Powers granted by Two Acts of Parliament, (Note: Sevenoaks and Tunbridge Highways Act 1709 (8 Ann. c. 20)) (Note: Kent Roads (No. 2) Act 1724 (11 Geo. 1. c. 15)) for repairing the Roads leading from Sevenoaks to Woodsgate and Tunbridge Wells, and from Woodsgate to Kippings Cross, in the County of Kent; and also for repairing the Roads from Kippings Cross aforesaid, to Lamberhurst Pound and Pullens Hill, in the said County, and to Flimwell Vent, in the County of Sussex. (Repealed by Sevenoaks and Tunbridge Wells Roads Act 1814 (54 Geo. 3. c. clxxiv))
Royston and Wandesford Bridge Road Act 1740 (repealed)	14 Geo. 2. c. 13	21 March 1741
An Act to enlarge the Terms and Powers granted by Three several Acts, made in the Ninth (Note: Royston and Wandesford Bridge Road Act 1710 (9 Ann. c. 14)) and Twelfth (Note: Royston and Wandesford Bridge Road Act 1713 (13 Ann. c. 33)) Years of the Reign of Her late Majesty Queen Anne, and in the Thirteenth Year of the Reign of His late Majesty King George the First, (Note: Royston and Wandesford Bridge Road Act 1726 (13 Geo. 1. c. 32)) for amending the Highways leading from Royston, in the County of Hertford, to Wandsford Bridge, in the County of Huntingdon, so far as the same relate to the Roads lying in the Middle and South Divisions of the said Highways. (Repealed by Road from Royston to Wandesford Bridge Act 1815 (55 Geo. 3. c. xxxv) and Royston and Wandesford Bridge Road Act 1822 (3 Geo. 4. c. lxviii))
Ely Roads Act 1740 (repealed)	14 Geo. 2. c. 14	21 March 1741
An Act to enlarge the Terms and Powers granted by an Act made in the First Year of His present Majesty's Reign, intituled, "An Act for repairing the Road leading from Chatteris Ferry (which divides the Isle of Ely from the County of Huntingdon) to Hammonds Eau, and from thence to Somersham Bridge, at Somersham Towns End, in the said County." (Note: Huntingdonshire Roads Act 1727 (1 Geo. 2. St. 2. c. 4)) (Repealed by Somersham Road (Huntingdonshire) Act 1820 (1 Geo. 4. c. lxxix))
Gainsborough Church Act 1740	14 Geo. 2. c. 15	21 March 1741
An Act for finishing and compleating the Parish Church of Gainsborough, in the County of Lincoln.
Kensington, Chelsea and Fulham Roads (Toll Continuance) Act 1740	14 Geo. 2. c. 16	21 March 1741
An Act for enlarging the Term and Powers granted by an Act made in the Twelfth Year of the Reign of His late Majesty King George the First, intituled, "An Act for repairing the Roads in the Parishes of Kensington, Chelsea, and Fulham, and other Parishes therein mentioned, in the County of Middlesex;" (Note: Kensington, Chelsea and Fulham Roads (Tolls) Act 1725 (12 Geo. 1. c. 37)) and for repairing some other Roads, in the Parish of St. George, Hanover Square, and the said Parishes of Kensington and Chelsea.
Delay of Cause after Issue Joined Act 1740 (repealed)	14 Geo. 2. c. 17	21 March 1741
An Act to prevent Inconveniencies arising from Delays of Causes after Issue joined. (Repealed by Civil Procedure Acts Repeal Act 1879 (42 & 43 Vict. c. 59))
Indemnity Act 1740 (repealed)	14 Geo. 2. c. 18	21 March 1741
An Act to indemnify Persons who have omitted to qualify themselves for Offices and Employments within the Time limited by Law; and for allowing further Time for that Purpose. (Repealed by Statute Law Revision Act 1867 (30 & 31 Vict. c. 59))
Wakefield, etc., Roads Act 1740 (repealed)	14 Geo. 2. c. 19	21 March 1741
An Act for repairing the Roads from a Place called Redhouse, near Doncaster, to Wakefield, and through the said Town of Wakefield, by Dewsbury, Hightoun and Lightcliff, to the Town of Halifax, in the West Riding of the County of York. (Repealed by Wakefield and Halifax Road Act 1828 (9 Geo. 4. c. lxix) and Doncaster, Wakefield, Pontefract, Weeland and Wentbridge Roads Act 1831 (1 Will. 4. c. xliv))
Common Recoveries, etc. Act 1740 (repealed)	14 Geo. 2. c. 20	21 March 1741
An Act to amend the Law concerning Common Recoveries; and to explain and amend an Act made in the Twenty-ninth Year of the Reign of King Charles the Second, intituled, "An Act for Prevention of Frauds and Perjuries," (Note: Statute of Frauds (29 Cha. 2. c. 3)) so far as the same relates to Estates pur auter Vie. (Note: An estate pur autre vie is an estate for life.) (Repealed by Statute Law Revision Act 1867 (30 & 31 Vict. c. 59))
Papists Act 1740 (repealed)	14 Geo. 2. c. 21	21 March 1741
An Act to indemnify Protestant Purchasers of Estates of Papists, against the Penalties or Forfeitures Papists are liable to, for not having enrolled their Estates, in Pursuance of an Act of the Third Year of the Reign of His late Majesty King George the First, (Note: Papists Act 1716 (3 Geo. 1. c. 18)) for that Purpose. (Repealed by Statute Law Revision Act 1867 (30 & 31 Vict. c. 59))
Salt Duties Act 1740 (repealed)	14 Geo. 2. c. 22	21 March 1741
An Act for granting and continuing the Duties upon Salt, and upon Red and White Herrings, for the further Term of Seven Years; and for allowing Rock Salt to be used, in making of Salt from Seawater, at the Salt Works at Neath, in the County of Glamorgan. (Repealed by Statute Law Revision Act 1867 (30 & 31 Vict. c. 59))
Yorkshire Roads Act 1740 (repealed)	14 Geo. 2. c. 23	21 March 1741
An Act for repairing the Road from Wakefield to Pontefract, and from thence to a Place called Weeland, in the Township of Hensall, and from Pontefract to Wentbridge, in the Township of Darrington, in the West Riding of the County of York. (Repealed by Doncaster, Wakefield, Pontefract, Weeland and Wentbridge Roads Act 1831 (1 Will. 4. c. xliv))
Waterbeach Level Drainage Act 1740	14 Geo. 2. c. 24	21 March 1741
An Act for the effectual Draining and Preservation of Waterbeach Level, in the County of Cambridge; and to establish an Agreement made between the Lord of the Manor of Waterbeach cum Denny and the Commoners within the said Manor.
Elland to Leeds Road Act 1740 (repealed)	14 Geo. 2. c. 25	21 March 1741
An Act for repairing the Road leading from Eland, to the Town of Leeds, in the West Riding of the County of York. (Repealed by Washingborough Inclosure Act 1827 (7 & 8 Geo. 4. c. xlix))
Caddington Church Act 1740	14 Geo. 2. c. 26	21 March 1741
An Act for making a Chapel lately built by John Coppin Esquire, at Market Street, in the Parish of Cadington, in the County of Hertford, a perpetual Cure and Benefice; and for other Purposes therein mentioned.
Saint Botolph, Aldgate Act 1740	14 Geo. 2. c. 27	21 March 1741
An Act to enable the Parishioners of the Parish of Saint Botolph without Aldgate, in the City of London, and County of Middlesex, to re-build the Church of the said Parish.
Doncaster and Tadcaster Road Act 1740 (repealed)	14 Geo. 2. c. 28	21 March 1741
An Act for repairing the Roads from Doncaster, through Ferrybridge, to the South Side of Tadcaster Cross, and also from Ferrybridge to Wetherby, and from thence to Borough Bridge, in the County of York. (Repealed by Road from Doncaster to Tadcaster Cross Act 1831 (1 & 2 Will. 4. c. xv) and Metropolitan Patent Wood Paving Company Act 1842 (5 & 6 Vict. c. lxxxv))
Wiltshire Roads Act 1740	14 Geo. 2. c. 29	21 March 1741
An Act for enlarging the Term and Powers granted by an Act passed in the Twelfth Year of the Reign of His late Majesty King George the First, intituled, "An Act for repairing and widening the Road from Horseley Upright Gate, leading down Bowden Hill, in the County of Wilts, to the Top of Kingsdown Hill, in the Parish of Box, in the said County." (Note: Wiltshire Roads (No. 2) Act 1725 (12 Geo. 1. c. 11))
Estates of John Coggs and John Dan Act 1740 (repealed)	14 Geo. 2. c. 30	21 March 1741
An Act for appointing new Commissioners and Trustees, for putting in Execution an Act passed in the Eighth Year of the Reign of Her late Majesty Queen Anne, intituled, "An Act for vesting the Estate and Effects of John Coggs and John Dann, Goldsmiths and Copartners, in Trustees, for the speedier Payment of their Creditors;" (Note: John Coggs's and John Dann's Estate Act 1709 (8 Ann. c. 24 Pr.)) and for determining Differences thereupon. (Repealed by Statute Law Revision Act 1948 (11 & 12 Geo. 6. c. 62))
Doncaster to Salter's Brook Road Act 1740 (repealed)	14 Geo. 2. c. 31	21 March 1741
An Act for repairing the Road from Doncaster (through the Parish of Peniston), in the County of York, to Saltersbrooke, in the County of Chester; and also the Road from Rotherham, in the said County of York, to Hartcliffe Hill, in the said Parish of Peniston. (Repealed by Road from Doncaster to Salter's Brook Bridge Act 1826 (7 Geo. 4. c. cxxx))
Leeds and Halifax Roads Act 1740 (repealed)	14 Geo. 2. c. 32	21 March 1741
An Act for repairing and enlarging the Roads from the Town of Selby, in the West Riding of the County of York, to the Town of Leeds, and from thence (in Two several Branches, One through Bradford and Horton, and the other through Bowling and Wibsey), to the Town of Halifax, in the same Riding. (Repealed by Selby and Leeds Road Act 1820 (1 Geo. 4. c. lxv) and Leeds and Halifax Turnpike Roads and Branches Act 1825 (6 Geo. 4. c. cxlix))
Bridges Act 1740 (repealed)	14 Geo. 2. c. 33	8 April 1741
An Act to supply some Defects in the Laws for repairing and re-building County Bridges; for repairing, enlarging, erecting, and providing, Houses of Correction; and for passing Rogues and Vagabonds. (Repealed by Highways Act 1959 (7 & 8 Eliz. 2. c. 25) and London Government Act 1963 (c. 33))
Continuance of Laws Act 1740 (repealed)	14 Geo. 2. c. 34	8 April 1741
An Act to continue an Act for Relief of Debtors, with respect to the Imprisonment of their Persons, and Two subsequent Acts, for explaining and amending the same; and also to continue an Act for the free Importation of Cochineal and Indico. (Repealed by Statute Law Revision Act 1867 (30 & 31 Vict. c. 59))
Cloth Manufacture Act 1740 (repealed)	14 Geo. 2. c. 35	8 April 1741
An Act for continuing an Act, passed in the Seventh Year of the Reign of His present Majesty, (Note: Cloth Manufacture Act 1733 (7 Geo. 2. c. 25)) to explain and amend a former Act, passed in the Eleventh Year of the Reign of His late Majesty King George the First, (Note: Cloth Manufacturer Act 1724 (11 Geo. 1. c. 24)) for the better regulating the Manufacture of Cloth, in the West Riding of the County of York; and for making the said Acts more effectual. (Repealed by Cloth Manufacture, Yorkshire Act 1765 (5 Geo. 3. c. 51))
Importation Act 1740 (repealed)	14 Geo. 2. c. 36	25 April 1741
An Act for opening a Trade to and from Persia, through Russia. (Repealed by Repeal of Acts Concerning Importation (No. 2) Act 1822 (3 Geo. 4. c. 42))
Bubble Schemes (Colonies) Act 1740 (repealed)	14 Geo. 2. c. 37	25 April 1741
An Act for restraining and preventing several unwarrantable Schemes and Undertakings, in His Majesty's Colonies and Plantations in America. (Repealed by Statute Law Revision Act 1867 (30 & 31 Vict. c. 59))
Navy Act 1740 (repealed)	14 Geo. 2. c. 38	25 April 1741
An Act for the Encouragement and Increase of Seamen, and for the better and speedier Manning His Majesty's Fleet. (Repealed by Pay of the Navy Act 1830 (11 Geo. 4 & 1 Will. 4. c. 20))
Longitude and Latitude Act 1740 (repealed)	14 Geo. 2. c. 39	25 April 1741
An Act for surveying the Chief Ports and Head Lands, on the Coasts of Great Britain and Ireland, and the Islands and Plantations thereto belonging, in order to the more exact Determination of the Longitude and Latitude thereof. (Repealed by Statute Law Revision Act 1867 (30 & 31 Vict. c. 59))
Westminster Bridge Act 1740 (repealed)	14 Geo. 2. c. 40	25 April 1741
An Act to enable the Commissioners for building a Bridge cross the River Thames, from the City of Westminster, to the opposite Shore in the County of Surrey, to raise a further Sum of Money, towards finishing the said Bridge, and to perform the other Trusts reposed in them; and for exchanging of Tickets unclaimed in the Westminster Bridge Lottery of the Twelfth Year of His present Majesty's Reign; and for making Provision for Tickets in the said Lottery, lost, burnt, or otherwise destroyed. (Repealed by Westminster Bridge Act 1853 (16 & 17 Vict. c. 46))
Supply, etc. Act 1740 (repealed)	14 Geo. 2. c. 41	25 April 1741
An Act for granting to His Majesty the Sum of One Million, out of the Sinking Fund; and for applying other Sums therein mentioned for the Service of the Year One Thousand Seven Hundred and Fortyone; and for allowing a Drawback of the Duties upon Coals used in Fire Engines, for draining Tin and Copper Mines, in the County of Cornwal; and for appropriating the Supplies granted in this Session of Parliament; and for making forth Duplicates of Exchequer Bills, Lottery Tickets, and Orders, lost, burnt, or otherwise destroyed; and for the giving further Time for the Payment of Duties omitted to be paid for the Indentures and Contracts of Clerks and Apprentices. (Repealed by Drawbacks on Coals, etc. Act 1821 (1 & 2 Geo. 4. c. 67) and Statute Law Revision Act 1867 (30 & 31 Vict. c. 59))
Preservation of Roads Act 1740 (repealed)	14 Geo. 2. c. 42	25 April 1741
An Act for the Preservation of the Public Roads, in that Part of Great Britain called England. (Repealed by Turnpike Roads Act 1766 (7 Geo. 3. c. 40) and Highways (No. 2) Act 1766 (7 Geo. 3. c. 42))
Portsmouth Water Supply (Farlington) Act 1740 (repealed)	14 Geo. 2. c. 43	25 April 1741
An Act to enable Thomas Smith Esquire, Lord of the Manor of Farlington, in the County of Southampton, to supply the Town of Portsmouth and Parts adjacent with good and wholesome Water, at his own proper Costs and Charges. (Repealed by Borough of Portsmouth Waterworks Act 1857 (20 & 21 Vict. c. xlv))

=== Private acts ===
Short title	Citation	Royal assent
Long title
Naturalization of John de Pesters Act 1740	14 Geo. 2. c. 1 Pr.	18 December 1740
An Act for naturalizing John De Pesters Esquire.
Robert Duke of Manchester's Estate Act 1740	14 Geo. 2. c. 2 Pr.	21 March 1741
An Act for enabling Robert Duke of Manchester to make a Jointure on his present Dutchess, and to make Leases of certain Parts of his Estate; and for other Purposes therein mentioned.
Vesting the seat and estates of Nicholas, Earl of Scarsdale (deceased) in Derbyshire and Nottinghamshire, comprised in his settlement and will, and his furniture, in trustees to be sold for speedier payment of debts, and preserving the surplus to be applied for the uses of his settlement and will.	14 Geo. 2. c. 3 Pr.	21 March 1741
An Act for vesting the Seat and Estates of Nicholas late Earl of Scarsdale, deceased, in the several Counties of Derby and Nottingham, comprized in his Settlement and Will, and the Furniture there at his Death, in Trustees, to be sold, for speedier Payment of his Debts; and preserving the Surplus to go according to his said Settlement and Will.
Mary Viscountess Barrington's Estate Act 1740	14 Geo. 2. c. 4 Pr.	21 March 1741
An Act for vesting in William Wildman Lord Viscount Barrington in the Kingdom of Ireland, for Life, certain Messuages and Tenements in the City of London, late the Estate of Mary Lady Viscountess Barrington his Wife, upon the Terms mentioned in their Marriage Settlement.
Enabling Sir John Jennings and his son George Jennings (a minor) to convey estates in Surrey and Hertfordshire for the benefit of George Jennings and any future wife and issue.	14 Geo. 2. c. 5 Pr.	21 March 1741
An Act for enabling Sir John Jennings and George Jennings Esquire his Son, a Minor, to convey certain Estates in Surrey and Hertfordshire, for the Benefit of the said George Jennings, and such Wife as he shall marry, and the Issue of such Marriage.
Vesting part of the tithes of Reigate (Surrey) in Robert Scawen and settling another estate to the uses limited of the said tithes by Sir William Scawen's will.	14 Geo. 2. c. 6 Pr.	21 March 1741
An Act for vesting Part of the Tithes of Rygate, in the County of Surrey, in Robert Scawen Esquire, and his Heirs; and for settling another Estate to the Uses limited of the said Tithes by the Will of Sir William Scawen Knight, deceased.
Estates late of Thomas Lewis (deceased): vesting in trustees to be sold for payment of debts and legacies.	14 Geo. 2. c. 7 Pr.	21 March 1741
An Act for vesting the Freehold and Leasehold Estates late of Thomas Lewis of Soberton Esquire, deceased, in Trustees, to be sold, for raising Money, to discharge his Debts and Legacies.
William Huddleston's Estate Act 1740	14 Geo. 2. c. 8 Pr.	21 March 1741
An Act for vesting certain Manors, Lands, and Tenements, of William Hudleston Esquire, in Trustees, to be sold, for Payment of his Debts.
John Neale's Estates Act 1740	14 Geo. 2. c. 9 Pr.	21 March 1741
An Act for Sale of the Estate of John Neale Esquire, in the County of Bucks; and for settling another Estate, in the County of Warwick, in Lieu thereof.
Thomas Western's settled estate in Buckinghamshire: vesting in him and his heirs and settling another in Cambridgeshire to uses of marriage settlement and rendering more effectual a power of revocation therein contained.	14 Geo. 2. c. 10 Pr.	21 March 1741
An Act for vesting the settled Estate of Thomas Western Esquire, in the County of Buckingham, in him and his Heirs; and for settling another Estate, in the County of Cambridge, of greater Value, to the Uses of his Marriage Settlement; and also for rendering a Power of Revocation, contained in that Settlement, more effectual for the Purposes thereby intended.
Great Driffield and Little Driffield (Yorkshire) Inclosure etc. Act 1740	14 Geo. 2. c. 11 Pr.	21 March 1741
An Act for dividing and enclosing several Open Fields, Pastures, and Commons, in the Townships of Great Driffield and Little Driffield, in the County of York; and for settling certain Yearly Payments to the Prebendary of Driffield for the Time being, in Lieu of his Tithes, pursuant to an Agreement and an Award made for those Purposes.
Chawton (Hampshire) Inclosure Act 1740	14 Geo. 2. c. 12 Pr.	21 March 1741
An Act for confirming and establishing Articles of Agreement, and an Award, for dividing and enclosing certain Common Fields, and a Common called Chawton Common, in the Parish of Chawton, in the County of Southampton.
Sherston Magna (Wiltshire) Inclosure Act 1740	14 Geo. 2. c. 13 Pr.	21 March 1741
An Act for dividing and enclosing the Common Fields, lying in the Manor and Parish of Sherston Magna, in the County of Wilts.
Brinklow (Warwickshire) Inclosure Act 1740	14 Geo. 2. c. 14 Pr.	21 March 1741
An Act for enclosing and dividing the Common Fields, Common Pastures, Common Meadows, and Waste Grounds, in the Manor and Parish of Brincklow, in the County of Warwick.
John Rice: enabling him and his heirs to take the surname Tutt, pursuant to the will of John Tutt, deceased.	14 Geo. 2. c. 15 Pr.	21 March 1741
An Act to enable John Rice and his Heirs to take and use the Surname of Tutt, pursuant to the Will of John Tutt Gentleman, deceased.
Edward Burnaby (an infant): enabling him and his heirs male to take the surname Greene, pursuant to the will of Thomas Greene, and other provisions.	14 Geo. 2. c. 16 Pr.	21 March 1741
An Act for enabling Edward Burnaby an Infant, and the Heirs Male of his Body, to take the Surname of Greene, pursuant to the Will of Thomas Greene Esquire, deceased; and for other Purposes therein mentioned.
Francis Thistlethwaite: enabling him and his heirs male to take the surname Whithed, pursuant to the will of Richard Withed.	14 Geo. 2. c. 17 Pr.	21 March 1741
An Act to enable Francis Thistlethwaite Esquire and the Heirs Male of his Body, to take and use the Surname of Whithed, pursuant to the Will and Codicils of Richard Whithed Esquire, deceased.
Thomas Edmunds' Estate Act 1740	14 Geo. 2. c. 18 Pr.	21 March 1741
An Act for vesting Part of the settled Estate of Thomas Edmunds Esquire, in Trustees, to be sold, for raising Money, to discharge the Debts of himself and his late Father, deceased; and for settling another Estate, of greater Value, in Lieu thereof.
Naturalization of John Richard Brinkman Act 1740	14 Geo. 2. c. 19 Pr.	21 March 1741
An Act for naturalizing John Richard Brinckman Esquire.
Naturalization of Martin Kuyck Van Mierop Act 1740	14 Geo. 2. c. 20 Pr.	21 March 1741
An Act for naturalizing Martin Kuyck Van Mierop.
Naturalization of Gideon Bourdillon, John Billon and Matthew Housman Act 1740	14 Geo. 2. c. 21 Pr.	21 March 1741
An Act for naturalizing Gedeon Bourdillon, John David Billon, and Mathew Housman.
Naturalization of Eve Superiori Act 1740	14 Geo. 2. c. 22 Pr.	21 March 1741
An Act for naturalizing Eve Superiori, alias Smith.
Naturalization of Ernest Barnerd Act 1740	14 Geo. 2. c. 23 Pr.	21 March 1741
An Act for naturalizing Ernest Barnerd.
Naturalization of Everand Ludewig Act 1740	14 Geo. 2. c. 24 Pr.	21 March 1741
An Act for naturalizing Everard John Ludewig.
Confirming and establishing a partition agreed between Henry Duke of Beaufort and William Duke of Portland of manors and lands in Hampshire and Wiltshire where they are fiefed as tenants in common and settling their shares to same uses as before partition.	14 Geo. 2. c. 25 Pr.	8 April 1741
An Act for establishing and confirming a Partition agreed to be made, between Henry Duke of Beaufort and William Duke of Portland, of the several Manors, Messuages, Lands, Tenements, and Hereditaments, in the Counties of Southampton and Wilts, whereof they are seised as Tenants in Common; and for settling their specific Shares and Allotments to such Uses as their undivided Moieties thereof now stand limited; and for other Purposes therein mentioned.
Enabling William Earl of Stafford to settle his estate whilst about 19 years old, upon his marriage to Lady Anne Campbell.	14 Geo. 2. c. 26 Pr.	8 April 1741
An Act to enable William Earl of Strafford, an Infant of about the Age of Nineteen Years, to make a Settlement of his Estate, upon his Marriage with the Lady Anne Campbell.
Earl Cowper's Estate Act 1740	14 Geo. 2. c. 27 Pr.	8 April 1741
An Act for explaining and making more effectual an Act made in the Twelfth Year of the Reign of His present Majesty, intituled, "An Act for discharging Part of the settled Estate of William Earl Cowper, in the County of Hertford, from the Uses and Limitations of a former Settlement; and for settling and securing an Equivalent for the same, to the like Uses." (Note: Earl Cowper's Estate Act 1738 (12 Geo. 2. c. 20 Pr.))
Earl of Arran's Estate Act 1740	14 Geo. 2. c. 28 Pr.	8 April 1741
An Act for enabling the Right Honourable Charles Earl of Arran to raise Money, by Sale or Mortgage of Part of his Estate in the Kingdom of Ireland, for Payment of Debts, and for other Purposes.
Viscount of Garnock's Estate Act 1740	14 Geo. 2. c. 29 Pr.	8 April 1741
An Act to enable George Viscount of Garnock to sell Lands, in the Counties of Dunbarton and Air, for Payment of Debts charged thereupon; and to purchase other Lands, to be settled to the same Uses as the Estate to be sold is settled.
Vacating a 100 year term in a voluntary settlement made by Sir Hugh Clopton and creating a new term of 1000 years in lieu.	14 Geo. 2. c. 30 Pr.	8 April 1741
An Act for vacating a Term of One Hundred Years, in a voluntary Settlement made by Sir Hugh Clopton Knight; and for creating a new Term of One Thousand Years, in Lieu thereof, for the Purposes therein mentioned.
Francis Pemberton's Estate Act 1740	14 Geo. 2. c. 31 Pr.	8 April 1741
An Act for vesting Part of the Estate of Francis Pemberton Esquire, in the County of Cambridge, in Trustees, to be sold, for discharging the Encumbrances thereon; and settling another Part of his Estate to the Uses, and for the Purposes, of his Marriage Settlement.
Empowering Gwyn Vaughan, his wife and sons to make leases of the manor of Kingston Seymour (Somerset) for years determinable on deaths.	14 Geo. 2. c. 32 Pr.	25 April 1741
An Act for empowering Gwyn Vaughan Esquire and his Wife, and their Sons, to make Leases of the Manor of Kingston Seymour, in the County of Somerset, for Lives, or Years determinable on Deaths, according to the Custom of the Country.
Naturalization of Francis D'Abbadie Act 1740	14 Geo. 2. c. 33 Pr.	25 April 1741
An Act for naturalizing Francis D'Abbadie.

=== Sources ===
- Pickering, Danby, ed. (1765). The Statutes at Large. Vol. 17 - 9th to the 15th Year of King George II – via Internet Archive.
- Pickering, Danby, ed. (1765). The Statutes at Large. Vol. 17 - 9th to the 15th Year of King George II – via Google Books.
- Journals of the House of Commons. Vol. 23. London: His Majesty's Stationery Office. 1803. pp. 531–711 – via Google Books.
- Chronological Table of and Index to the Statutes. Vol. 1: To the End of the Session 59 Vict. Sess. 2 (1895) (13th ed.). London: Her Majesty's Stationery Office. 1896. p. 106 – via Google Books.

== See also ==
- List of acts of the Parliament of Great Britain
