= Kensington, Chelsea and Fulham Roads (Tolls) Act 1725 =

Act of the Parliament of Great Britain

- Act of Parliament
- Parliament of Great Britain
- Long title: An Act for repairing the Roads, in the Parishes of Kensington, Chelsea, and Fulham, and other Parishes therein mentioned, in the County of Middlesex.
- Citation: 12 Geo. 1. c. 37
- Territorial extent: Great Britain

Dates
- Royal assent: 24 May 1726
- Commencement: 20 January 1726 (Note: Start of session.)
- Expired: 31 May 1747
- Repealed: 31 January 2013

Other legislation
- Amended by: Kensington, Chelsea and Fulham Roads (Toll Continuance) Act 1740; St. George Hanover Square Improvement Act 1813; St. George Hanover Square Improvement Act 1826
- Repealed by: Statute Law (Repeals) Act 2013
- Relates to: Fulham Roads Act 1730; Fulham Roads Act 1749; Streets (London) Act 1766

Status: Repealed

Text of statute as originally enacted

The Kensington, Chelsea and Fulham Roads (Tolls) Act 1725 (12 Geo. 1. c. 37) was an act of the Parliament of Great Britain authorising the charging of tolls at turnpikes along specified roads in the parishes of Kensington, Chelsea and Fulham in the county of Middlesex.

The toll granted by the act took place on 1 June 1726 for a term of 21 years, with authority to charge tolls to expire no later than 31 May 1747. The toll was extended for 21 years by the Kensington, Chelsea and Fulham Roads (Toll Continuance) Act 1740 (14 Geo. 2. c. 16).

The act became obsolete in 1747 and was repealed by the Statute Law (Repeals) Act 2013 which had been recommended by the Law Commission.

== Background ==
Prior to the late 19th century, Britain lacked a national framework for highway maintenance. The responsibility for road upkeep primarily fell on the local population through two main systems:

- Statute labour: for much of the 17th, 18th and 19th centuries, every able-bodied man to contribute six days of unpaid labour annually to repair local roads.
- Turnpikes: introduced in 1663, toll-gates placed across roads, requiring travellers to pay a fee for passage, with the collected revenue was then used for road repair and maintenance.

Several roads in the parishes of Kensington, Chelsea and Fulham had become poorly maintained, requiring repair:

- From Counters Bridge in Kensington to the Stones End near Piccadilly
- From Fulham ferry to Knightsbridge
- From Chelsea ferry to the Stones End at James Street, Westminster
- From the town of Kensington to Chelsea Church
- From the junction of North End and the Hammersmith Road to Wansdown Green
- From Hyde Park Corner to the lower road from Chelsea to Westminster

== Provisions ==
The act provided:

- Appointment of Trustees to carry out the act
- Authorised the Trustees to erect turnpike gates to the east of Hyde Park (near Hay-Hill); to the east of William Green's Brewhouse (leading to Chelsea); and between Kensington and Chelsea.
- For settling of tolls depending on the type of vehicle.
- Penalties for non-payment of tolls or for assisting its evasion by means of a diversion road.
- Exemptions from liability for tolls.
- Trustees’ power to appoint officers including receivers, collectors and surveyors; penalty for any receiver failing to account for toll moneys received.
- Surveyors authorised to take steps to collect from neighbouring land any building materials necessary to repair the roads and to remove obstructions from the roadways; surveyors authorised to widen roads, make pavements and lay drains and pay compensation to adjoining owners.
- Trustees authorised to borrow money on the security of the tolls; only one toll to be paid per road despite the number of turnpikes to be passed on that road; anti-avoidance provisions; exemptions from tolls.
- Continuance of any existing liability to repair the roads; position as to liability for statute labour; recovery of penalties imposed under this act
- The tolls imposed by the act to continue for 21 years from 1 June 1726 (unless the roads were sufficiently repaired before then).
- Appointment of replacement Trustees; first meeting of Trustees to be on or before 26 May 1726.
- Provision for the watering of the road from Piccadilly to Hyde Park Gate to settle the dust in dry weather.
- Civil procedure issues and status of the act.

== Subsequent developments ==
Under the terms of the act, the authority to charge tolls was to expire no later than 31 May 1747. The 19th Statute Law Repeals Report of the Law Commission recommend repealing the act:

"Since the repair of the roads pursuant to the Act was dependent upon the receipt of those tolls, it follows that the Act as a whole has served no useful purpose for at least 260 years."

The whole act was repealed by section 1 of, and the group 2 of part 6 of the schedule to, the Statute Law (Repeals) Act 2013, which came into force on 31 January 2013.
