= List of acts of the Parliament of Great Britain from 1725 =

This is a complete list of acts of the Parliament of Great Britain for the year 1725.

For acts passed until 1707, see the list of acts of the Parliament of England and the list of acts of the Parliament of Scotland. See also the list of acts of the Parliament of Ireland.

For acts passed from 1801 onwards, see the list of acts of the Parliament of the United Kingdom. For acts of the devolved parliaments and assemblies in the United Kingdom, see the list of acts of the Scottish Parliament, the list of acts of the Northern Ireland Assembly, and the list of acts and measures of Senedd Cymru; see also the list of acts of the Parliament of Northern Ireland.

The number shown after each act's title is its chapter number. Acts are cited using this number, preceded by the year(s) of the reign during which the relevant parliamentary session was held; thus the Union with Ireland Act 1800 is cited as "39 & 40 Geo. 3. c. 67", meaning the 67th act passed during the session that started in the 39th year of the reign of George III and which finished in the 40th year of that reign. Note that the modern convention is to use Arabic numerals in citations (thus "41 Geo. 3" rather than "41 Geo. III"). Acts of the last session of the Parliament of Great Britain and the first session of the Parliament of the United Kingdom are both cited as "41 Geo. 3".

Acts passed by the Parliament of Great Britain did not have a short title; however, some of these acts have subsequently been given a short title by acts of the Parliament of the United Kingdom (such as the Short Titles Act 1896).

Before the Acts of Parliament (Commencement) Act 1793 came into force on 8 April 1793, acts passed by the Parliament of Great Britain were deemed to have come into effect on the first day of the session in which they were passed. Because of this, the years given in the list below may in fact be the year before a particular act was passed.

== 12 Geo. 1 ==
The fourth session of the 6th Parliament of Great Britain, which met from 20 January 1726 until 24 May 1726.

This session was also traditionally cited as 12 G. 1.

=== Public acts ===
Short title	Citation	Royal assent
Long title
Land Tax Act 1725 (repealed)	12 Geo. 1. c. 1	24 February 1726
An Act for granting an Aid to His Majesty, by a Land Tax, to be raised in Great Britain, for the Service of the Year One Thousand Seven Hundred Twenty-six. (Repealed by Statute Law Revision Act 1867 (30 & 31 Vict. c. 59))
Pension Duties Act 1725 (repealed)	12 Geo. 1. c. 2	24 February 1726
An Act for granting to His Majesty the Sum of One Million, to be raised by Way of a Lottery. (Repealed by Statute Law Revision Act 1870 (33 & 34 Vict. c. 69) and Statute Law Revision Act 1948 (11 & 12 Geo. 6. c. 62))
Mutiny Act 1725 (repealed)	12 Geo. 1. c. 3	24 February 1726
An Act for punishing Mutiny and Desertion; and for the better Payment of the Army and their Quarters. (Repealed by Statute Law Revision Act 1867 (30 & 31 Vict. c. 59))
Malt Duties, etc. Act 1725 (repealed)	12 Geo. 1. c. 4	26 April 1726
An Act for continuing the Duties upon Malt, Mum, Cyder, and Perry, in that Part of Great Britain called England; and for granting to His Majesty certain Duties upon Malt, Mum, Cyder, and Perry, in that Part of Great Britain called Scotland, for the Service of the Year One Thousand Seven Hundred and Twenty-six; and for the more effectual preventing Frauds and Abuses in the shipping of Malt for Exportation to Foreign Parts; and for ascertaining the Price of Ale to be sold in Scotland; and for making good the Deficiency on the Lottery Tickets of the Year One Thousand Seven Hundred and Twenty-four; and for making forth Duplicates of Exchequer Bills, Lottery Tickets, and Orders, lost, burnt, or otherwise destroyed. (Repealed by Statute Law Revision Act 1875 (38 & 39 Vict. c. 66))
Leicestershire Road Act 1725 (repealed)	12 Geo. 1. c. 5	26 April 1726
An Act for repairing the Road from Market Harborough to Loughborough, in the County of Leicester. (Repealed by Roads from Market Harborough to Loughborough Act 1830 (11 Geo. 4 & 1 Will. 4. c. iii))
Birmingham to Edgehill Road Act 1725 (repealed)	12 Geo. 1. c. 6	26 April 1726
An Act for repairing the Roads leading from Birmingham, through Warwick, to Warmington, and from Birmingham, through Stratford upon Avon, to Edghill, in the County of Warwick. (Repealed by Birmingham and Stratford-upon-Avon Road Act 1821 (1 & 2 Geo. 4. c. lxxxi) and Birmingham and Edgehill Road Act 1830 (11 Geo. 4 & 1 Will. 4. c. xciv))
Wiltshire Roads Act 1725 (repealed)	12 Geo. 1. c. 7	26 April 1726
An Act for enlarging the Term granted by an Act passed in the Sixth Year of the Reign of Her late Majesty Queen Anne, intituled, "An Act for the better Amendment of that Way which leads from Cherrill, through Calne, to Studley Bridge, in the County of Wilts;" (Note: Wilts Highways Act 1707 (6 Ann. c. 76)) and for making the said Act more effectual; and for extending the Road, so to be amended, from Cherrill to the Three Miles Borough, at the Top of Cherrill Hill. (Repealed by Road to Studley Bridge Act 1813 (53 Geo. 3. c. cxxviii) and Annual Turnpike Acts Continuance Act 1871 (34 & 35 Vict. c. 115))
Newbury to Marlborough Road Act 1725 (repealed)	12 Geo. 1. c. 8	26 April 1726
An Act for repairing the Highways from Speenham Land, adjoining to Newbury, in the County of Berks, to Marlborough, in the County of Wilts. (Repealed by Berks and Wilts Roads Act 1770 (10 Geo. 3. c. 100))
Shropshire Roads Act 1725 (repealed)	12 Geo. 1. c. 9	26 April 1726
An Act for repairing the Roads therein mentioned, between Crackley Bank, in the Parish of Idsall, alias Shiffnall, and the Town of Shrewsbury, in the County of Salop. (Repealed by Watling Street Road Act 1808 (48 Geo. 3. c. lxv))
Hertfordshire Roads Act 1725 (repealed)	12 Geo. 1. c. 10	26 April 1726
An Act for repairing the Roads from Lemsford Mill, in the County of Hertford, to Welwyn, and from thence to Cory's Mill, and from Welwyn (through Codicot) to Hitchin, in the said County; and for enlarging the Term granted by an Act passed in the Sixth Year of the Reign of His present Majesty, (Note: Stevenage and Biggleswade Road Act 1719 (6 Geo. 1. c. 25)) for repairing the Roads from Steevenage, in the said County, to Biggleswade, in the County of Bedford. (Repealed by Bishop's Hatfield and Hitchin, and Welwyn and Hitchin Roads Act 1831 (1 Will. 4. c. xxxvi) and Stevenage, Biggleswade and Arsley Road Act 1832 (2 & 3 Will. 4. c. lxxvi))
Wiltshire Roads (No. 2) Act 1725	12 Geo. 1. c. 11	26 April 1726
An Act for repairing and widening the Road from Horsley Upright Gate, leading down Bowden Hill, in the County of Wilts, to the Top of Kingsdown Hill, in the Parish of Box, in the said County.
Taxation, etc. Act 1725 (repealed)	12 Geo. 1. c. 12	26 April 1726
An Act for granting an Aid to His Majesty, by laying a Duty upon all Victualers, and Retailers of Beer and Ale, within the Cities of London and Westminster, and the Weekly Bills of Mortality; and for prohibiting their sending Beer or Ale out of their Houses to distant Places in any Pots or Vessels less than a Gallon; and also for adding One Hundred additional Hackney Chairs to those already licensed; and for applying certain Arrears of former Land Taxes towards the Supply granted to His Majesty for the Service of the Year One Thousand Seven Hundred and Twenty-six; and for appropriating the Supplies granted in this Session of Parliament. (Repealed by Statute Law Revision Act 1867 (30 & 31 Vict. c. 59))
Gloucester and Hereford Roads Act 1725 (repealed)	12 Geo. 1. c. 13	26 April 1726
An Act for repairing and widening the Roads from the City of Gloucester to the City of Hereford. (Repealed by Roads from Newent Act 1824 (5 Geo. 4. c. xi), Roads from Gloucester City Act 1833 (3 & 4 Will. 4. c. lv) and Roads through Huntley from Gloucester Act 1833 (3 & 4 Will. 4. c. lxxv))
Worcester Roads Act 1725 (repealed)	12 Geo. 1. c. 14	26 April 1726
An Act for repairing several Roads therein mentioned, leading into the City of Worcester. (Repealed by Worcester (City) Roads Act 1816 (56 Geo. 3. c. xlvi))
Norfolk (Improvement) Act 1725 (repealed)	12 Geo. 1. c. 15	26 April 1726
An Act for repairing the Walls, Gates, and other public Works, in the City of Norwich, and several Bridges in and near the said City; and for amending the Roads therein mentioned. (Repealed by Norwich Public Works, Bridges and Roads Act 1839 (2 & 3 Vict. c. lxii) and Norwich City Council Act 1984 (c. xxiii))
Foston Bridge and Witham Common Road Act 1725 (repealed)	12 Geo. 1. c. 16	26 April 1726
An Act for repairing the Road from Spittlegate Hill, near Grantham, in the County of Lincoln, to Little Drayton, in the County of Nottingham. (Repealed by Foston Bridge and Little Drayton Road Act 1799 (39 Geo. 3. c. xxvi) and Road from Foston Bridge (Lincolnshire) Act 1808 (48 Geo. 3. c. lxiii))
Tyburn and Uxbridge Road Act 1725 (repealed)	12 Geo. 1. c. 17	26 April 1726
An Act for enlarging the Term granted by an Act made in the First Year of His present Majesty's Reign, intituled, "An Act for repairing and amending the Highways between Tyburn and Uxbridge, in the County of Middlesex;" (Note: Repair of Highways between Tyburn and Uxbridge Act 1715 (1 Geo. 1. St. 2. c. 25 Pr.)) and for making the said Act more effectual. (Repealed by Roads between Tyburn and Uxbridge Act 1826 (7 Geo. 4. c. lxxvi))
Tewkesbury Roads Act 1725 (repealed)	12 Geo. 1. c. 18	26 April 1726
An Act for repairing the several Roads therein mentioned, leading into the Town of Tewkesbury, in the County of Gloucester. (Repealed by Statute Law (Repeals) Act 2013 (c. 2))
Petersfield to Portsmouth Road Act 1725 (repealed)	12 Geo. 1. c. 19	26 April 1726
An Act for enlarging the Term granted by an Act passed in the Ninth Year of the Reign of Her late Majesty Queen Anne, intituled, "An Act for repairing the Highways from Sheetbridge, in the Parish of Petersfield, to the Town of Portsmouth, in the County of Southampton;" (Note: Petersfield Highways Act 1710 (9 Ann. c. 33)) and for making the said Act more effectual. (Repealed by Southampton Roads Act 1772 (12 Geo. 3. c. 108))
Worcester to Droitwich Road Act 1725 (repealed)	12 Geo. 1. c. 20	26 April 1726
An Act for enlarging the Term granted by an Act passed in the Twelfth Year of the Reign of Her late Majesty Queen Anne, intituled, "An Act for repairing the Highway or Road from the City of Worcester, to the Borough of Droitwich in the County of Worcester;" (Note: Worcester Highways Act 1713 (13 Ann. c. 27)) and for making the same more effectual; and for repairing other Roads therein mentioned, in the said County of Worcester. (Repealed by Worcester Roads Act 1793 (33 Geo. 3. c. 175))
Liverpool to Prescot Road Act 1725 (repealed)	12 Geo. 1. c. 21	26 April 1726
An Act for repairing and enlarging the Road from Liverpool to Prescot, and other Roads therein mentioned, in the County Palatine of Lancaster. (Repealed by Lancaster Roads Act 1771 (11 Geo. 3. c. 91))
Norwich and Thetford Road Act 1725 (repealed)	12 Geo. 1. c. 22	26 April 1726
An Act to continue Two Acts of Parliament, for repairing the Highways between Wymondham and Attleborough, and from Wymondham to Hetherset, in the County of Norfolk, the One passed in the Seventh and Eighth Years of the Reign of His late Majesty King William the Third, (Note: Norfolk Roads Act 1695 (7 & 8 Will. 3. c. 26)) and the other in the Seventh Year of the Reign of Her late Majesty Queen Anne; (Note: Norfolk Highways Act 1708 (7 Ann. c. 8)) and for repairing the Road from the Mouth of Wigmore Lane to Hall Walk Gate, in Attleborough, in the said County. (Repealed by Norwich and Thetford Road Act 1816 (56 Geo. 3. c. lxviii) and Annual Turnpike Acts Continuance Act 1869 (32 & 33 Vict. c. 90))
Essex Roads Act 1725 (repealed)	12 Geo. 1. c. 23	26 April 1726
An Act for repairing the Roads leading from the Western Part of the Parish of Shenfield to Harwich, in the County of Essex; and the Road leading from Chelmsford, in the said County, to Sudbury, in the County of Suffolk; and from Margreting (Note: Margaretting, Essex. 51°41′22″N 0°25′00″E) to Malden, (Note: Maldon, Essex. 51°43′52″N 0°40′29″E) in the County of Essex; and from Colchester to Langham, in the same County. (Repealed by Statute Law (Repeals) Act 2008 (c. 12))
Gloucestershire Roads Act 1725 (repealed)	12 Geo. 1. c. 24	26 April 1726
An Act for repairing the Road from the City of Gloucester to Stone, and also the Roads to and near Berkeley, Dursley, Wootten Under Edge, Stroud, and Sodbury, in the County of Gloucester. (Repealed by Statute Law (Repeals) Act 2013 (c. 2))
Saint James' Square (Rates) Act 1725	12 Geo. 1. c. 25	26 April 1726
An Act to enable the present and future Inhabitants of the East, North, and West Sides, or Lines, of St. James's Square, to make a Rate on themselves, for raising Money sufficient to clean, adorn, and beautify the said Square, and to continue the same in Repair.
Taxation, etc. (No. 2) Act 1725 (repealed)	12 Geo. 1. c. 26	24 May 1726
An Act for repealing the Duty laid upon Snuff, by an Act made in the Eighth Year of Her late Majesty's Reign; (Note: Exportation (No. 2) Act 1709 (8 Ann. c. 7)) and for ascertaining the Rates according to which the remaining Duties are to be paid; and for giving further Encouragement to the Greenland Fishery. (Repealed by Statute Law Revision Act 1867 (30 & 31 Vict. c. 59))
Glasgow Beer Duties Act 1725 (repealed)	12 Geo. 1. c. 27	24 May 1726
An Act for vesting in His Majesty an Imposition of Two Pennies Scots upon all Ale and Beer brewed and sold in the City of Glasgow and Privileges thereof, for satisfying the Damages and Losses which Daniel Campbell Esquire (Note: This is Daniel Campbell, the then MP for Clyde Burghs constituency.) lately suffered in a Riot (Note: This is a reference to the malt tax riots in Glasgow in June 1725.) there. (Repealed by Statute Law Revision Act 1948 (11 & 12 Geo. 6. c. 62))
Customs, etc., Revenues Act 1725 (repealed)	12 Geo. 1. c. 28	24 May 1726
An Act for the Improvement of His Majesty's Revenues of Customs, Excise, and Inland Duties. (Repealed by Statute Law Revision Act 1867 (30 & 31 Vict. c. 59))
Frivolous Arrests Act 1725 (repealed)	12 Geo. 1. c. 29	24 May 1726
An Act to prevent frivolous and vexatious Arrests. (Repealed by Statute Law Revision Act 1867 (30 & 31 Vict. c. 59), Bankruptcy Repeal and Insolvent Court Act 1869 (32 & 33 Vict. c. 83), Perjury Act 1911 (1 & 2 Geo. 5. c. 6) and Statute Law Revision Act 1948 (11 & 12 Geo. 6. c. 62))
Continuance of 9 Geo. 1. c. 22 Act 1725 (repealed)	12 Geo. 1. c. 30	24 May 1726
An Act for continuing an Act made in the Ninth Year of His Majesty's Reign, intituled, "An Act for the more effectual punishing wicked and evil-disposed Persons going armed in Disguise, and doing Injuries and Violences to the Persons and Properties of His Majesty's Subjects; and for the more speedy bringing the Offenders to Justice." (Note: Criminal Law Act 1722 (9 Geo. 1. c. 22)) (Repealed by Statute Law Revision Act 1867 (30 & 31 Vict. c. 59))
Nisi Prius (Middlesex) Act 1725 (repealed)	12 Geo. 1. c. 31	24 May 1726
An Act for the better regulating Trials by Nisi Prius, in the County of Middlesex. (Repealed by Civil Procedure Acts Repeal Act 1879 (42 & 43 Vict. c. 59))
Suitors of Court of Chancery Act 1725 (repealed)	12 Geo. 1. c. 32	24 May 1726
An Act for better securing the Monies and Effects of the Suitors of the Court of Chancery; and to prevent the counterfeiting of East India Bonds, and Endorsements thereon; as likewise Endorsements on South Sea Bonds. (Repealed by Court of Chancery (Funds) Act 1872 (35 & 36 Vict. c. 44))
Suitors of Court of Chancery (No. 2) Act 1725 (repealed)	12 Geo. 1. c. 33	24 May 1726
An Act for Relief of the Suitors of the High Court of Chancery. (Repealed by Court of Chancery (Funds) Act 1872 (35 & 36 Vict. c. 44))
Woollen Manufactures Act 1725 or the Truck Act 1725 (repealed)	12 Geo. 1. c. 34	24 May 1726
An Act to prevent unlawful Combinations of Workmen employed in the Woollen Manufactures, and for better Payment of their Wages. (Repealed by Master and Servant Act 1889 (52 & 53 Vict. c. 24))
Brick Making Act 1725 (repealed)	12 Geo. 1. c. 35	24 May 1726
An Act to prevent Abuses in the making of Bricks and Tiles, and to ascertain the Dimensions thereof; and to prevent all unlawful Combinations amongst any Brickmakers or Tilemakers, within Fifteen Miles of the City of London, in order to advance or enhance the Price of Bricks or Tiles. (Repealed by Statute Law Revision Act 1867 (30 & 31 Vict. c. 59))
Fulham and Putney Bridge Act 1725 (repealed)	12 Geo. 1. c. 36	24 May 1726
An Act for building a Bridge cross the River of Thames, from the Town of Fulham, in the County of Middlesex, to the Town of Putney, in the County of Surrey. (Repealed by Putney and Fulham Bridge Act 1863 (26 & 27 Vict. c. ccxi))
Kensington, Chelsea and Fulham Roads (Tolls) Act 1725 (repealed)	12 Geo. 1. c. 37	24 May 1726
An Act for repairing the Roads, in the Parishes of Kensington, Chelsea, and Fulham, and other Parishes therein mentioned, in the County of Middlesex. (Repealed by Statute Law (Repeals) Act 2013 (c. 2))
River Dun Navigation Act 1725	12 Geo. 1. c. 38	24 May 1726
An Act for making the River Dun, in the West Riding of the County of York, navigable, from Holmstile, to Doncaster, up to the utmost Extent of Tinsley, Westward, a Township within Two Miles of Sheffield.
Saint Mary-le-Strand Rectory Act 1725	12 Geo. 1. c. 39	24 May 1726
An Act for making Provision for the Rector of St. Mary le Strand, in the County of Middlesex; and for other Purposes therein mentioned.

=== Private acts ===
Short title	Citation	Royal assent
Long title
Lord Ashburnham's Estate Act 1725	12 Geo. 1. c. 1 Pr.	26 April 1726
An Act for the better enabling the Trustees of John Lord Ashburnham to sell Brockborough and Beckerings Parks, in the County of Bedford.
Compton Bassett Inclosure Act 1725	12 Geo. 1. c. 2 Pr.	26 April 1726
An Act for dividing and enclosing, or holding in Severalty, the Common Field, within the Parish of Compton Basset, in the County of Wilts.
Bubbenhall Inclosure Act 1725	12 Geo. 1. c. 3 Pr.	26 April 1726
An Act for enclosing several Common Fields, in the Parish of Bubnell, alias Bobenhull, in the County of Warwick.
Dischasing and disfranchising the Chase of Alrewas Hay (Staffordshire) and impowering John Turton, the owner, to inclose part of the chase, and other provisions.	12 Geo. 1. c. 4 Pr.	26 April 1726
An Act for dischasing and disfranchising the Chase of Alrewas Hay, in the County of Stafford; and for the impowering John Turton Esquire, Owner thereof to inclose a Part of such Chase, and for other Purposes in the said Act mentioned.
Fangfoss cum Spittle and Scagglethorpe (Yorkshire) (East Riding) Inclosures Act 1725	12 Geo. 1. c. 5 Pr.	26 April 1726
An Act for confirming several Awards, made for enclosing and dividing the Common Fields and Common Grounds, within the Manors of Fangfosse cum Spittle and Scagglethorpe, in the County of York.
Enabling His Majesty to grant the inheritance of Bowood Park (Wiltshire) to trustees upon trust for Sir Orlando Bridgeman, upon payment of full consideration.	12 Geo. 1. c. 6 Pr.	26 April 1726
An Act to enable His Majesty to grant the Inheritance of certain Lands called Bowood Park, in the County of Wilts, to Trustees, for Sir Orlando Bridgeman Baronet and his Heirs, upon a full Consideration to be paid for the same.
Enabling His Majesty to grant the inheritance of the site of Furness Abbey, in trust for Sir Thomas Lowther, upon payment of its value to Exchequer.	12 Geo. 1. c. 7 Pr.	26 April 1726
An Act to enable His Majesty to grant the Inheritance of the Scite of the dissolved Monastery of Furneis, in the County of Lancaster, to Trustees, for Sir Thomas Lowther Baronet and his Heirs, upon paying the Value thereof into the Exchequer.
Ascertaining lands in Gloucestershire purchased by Sir Grenville Verney and for effectual partition of manor of Tudrington and Itchington (Gloucestershire).	12 Geo. 1. c. 8 Pr.	26 April 1726
An Act for ascertaining several Messuages and Lands, in the County of Gloucester, purchased by Sir Greville Verney; and for the effectual Partition of the Manor of Tudrington and Itchington, in the said County.
Carpenter's Estate Act 1725	12 Geo. 1. c. 9 Pr.	26 April 1726
An Act to rectify a Mistake in the Settlement made on the Marriage of the Honourable George Carpenter Esquire with Elizabeth his now Wife.
Loundes' Estate Act 1725	12 Geo. 1. c. 10 Pr.	26 April 1726
An Act to enable Charles Lowndes Gentleman, and the Persons in Remainder after him, to make Contracts for getting Brick Earth in, and grant Building Leases of, the House and Ground called Spring Garden, and other the Ground called Great Spittlefield and Little Spittlefield, in the Parishes of St. Martin in the Fields and Chelsea, in the County of Middlesex, late the Estate of William Lowndes Esquire, deceased.
Enabling the Treasury to compound with Thomas Baynton and Robert Shaw for a debt owed to the Crown on account of bonds given for tobacco duties.	12 Geo. 1. c. 11 Pr.	26 April 1726
An Act to enable the Lords Commissioners of the Treasury, or the Lord High Treasurer, for the Time being, to compound with Thomas Baynton and Robert Shaw, late of London, Merchants and Co-partners, for a Debt due from them to the Crown, on account of Bonds given for the Duties of Tobacco.
Bayly's Estate Act 1725	12 Geo. 1. c. 12 Pr.	26 April 1726
An Act for discharging certain Lands in the County of Wilts, from the Uses and Estates limited thereof in the Settlement made by Zachary Bayly Gentleman, after his Marriage with Mercy his Wife; and for settling other Lands, of greater Yearly Value, in the Counties of Somerset and Wilts, in Lieu thereof.
Trye's Estate Act 1725	12 Geo. 1. c. 13 Pr.	26 April 1726
An Act for vesting in Trustees the Manors of Hardwick and Haresfield, and other Lands, in the County of Gloucester, the Estate of Thomas Trye Esquire, to be sold, for Payment of his Debts; and for other Purposes therein mentioned.
Byde's Estate Act 1725	12 Geo. 1. c. 14 Pr.	26 April 1726
An Act for confirming a Lease made by Thomas Byde Esquire to James Fordham, therein mentioned; and to enable him to let Leases of any Part of his Estate, for any Number of Years not exceeding Eighty-eight Years.
Jeffery's Estate Act 1725	12 Geo. 1. c. 15 Pr.	26 April 1726
An Act for Sale of the Manor of Warkleigh, and other Lands and Hereditaments, in the Parishes of Warkleigh, Satterly, and Roborough, in the County of Devon, the Estate of Thomas Jeffery of the City of Exon Merchant, towards raising Provisions for Susanna his Wife, and their Children, for securing whereof the said Manor and Lands were at the Time of their Marriage made liable.
Ransford's Estate Act 1725	12 Geo. 1. c. 16 Pr.	26 April 1726
An Act to enable the Trustees of Edward Ransford Esquire to make Leases of certain Messuages, Houses, and Plots of Ground, in and near the City of Dublin.
Naturalization of John Pontz, John Christopher, Balthazar Wagner and Others Act 1725	12 Geo. 1. c. 17 Pr.	26 April 1726
An Act for naturalizing John Pontz, John Christopher Balthazar Wagner, and others.
Naturalization of Jean Jacques Coulliette de Valicourt Act 1725	12 Geo. 1. c. 18 Pr.	26 April 1726
An Act for naturalizing Jean Jaques Coulliette de Valicourt.
Sale of the site of Cardigan House in Great Lincoln's Inn Fields (Middlesex) lately demolished by fire, and settlement of lands of greater value in Yorkshire to the same uses.	12 Geo. 1. c. 19 Pr.	24 May 1726
An Act for Sale of the Scite of Cardigan House, lately demolished by Fire, situate and being in Great Lincoln's Inn Fields, in the County of Middlesex, for the Purposes therein mentioned; and for settling Lands of greater Value, in the County of York, to the same Uses.
Lord Waldegrave's Estate Act 1725	12 Geo. 1. c. 20 Pr.	24 May 1726
An Act for Sale of Part of the settled Estate of James Lord Waldegrave, in the County of Somerset; and for settling other Lands in Lieu thereof; and for other Purposes therein mentioned.
Fortescue's Estate Act 1725	12 Geo. 1. c. 21 Pr.	24 May 1726
An Act for discharging the Barton and Lands of and in Catch French, in the County of Cornwall, from the Uses and Limitations contained in the Will of Hugh Fortescue Esquire; and for settling the Barton and Demesne of Townhouse, and other Lands in the County of Devon, of greater Value, in Lieu thereof.
Lumley's Estate Act 1725	12 Geo. 1. c. 22 Pr.	24 May 1726
An Act to repeal an Act, made in the Sixth Year of the Reign of His present Majesty King George, intituled, "An Act to enable Sir James Lumley Baronet to settle a competent Jointure; and for other Purposes therein mentioned;" (Note: Lumley's Estate Act 1719 (6 Geo. 1. c. 34 Pr.)) and also to vest the several Estates of the said Sir James Lumley, herein mentioned, in Trustees, to be sold, for Payment of the Debts and Legacies of Sir Martin Lumley Baronet, his late Father, deceased, and the said Sir James Lumley's own Debts.
Dame Mary Grosvenor's Estate Act 1725	12 Geo. 1. c. 23 Pr.	24 May 1726
An Act for making Leases of divers Lands and Grounds, in the County of Middlesex, the Estate of Dame Mary Grosvenor, a Lunatic, during her Life.
Burke's Estate Act 1725	12 Geo. 1. c. 24 Pr.	24 May 1726
An Act for Sale of Part of the Estate of Sir Festus Burke Baronet, towards discharging the Debts and Incumbrances affecting the same; and for making a Provision for the Lady Letitia his Wife, Eldest Daughter of the Right Honourable John late Earl of Clamickard in the Kingdom of Ireland.
Vesting manors and lands in Devon in Dame Mary Tipping and manors and lands in Oxfordshire and Buckinghamshire in Dame Anne Tipping.	12 Geo. 1. c. 25 Pr.	24 May 1726
An Act for vesting certain Manors and Lands, in the Counties of Oxon and Bucks, in Dame Anne Tipping and her Heirs; and certain Manors and Lands, in the County of Devon, in Dame Mary Tipping and her Heirs; and for other Purposes in the said Act mentioned.
Sidney's Estate Act 1725	12 Geo. 1. c. 26 Pr.	24 May 1726
An Act for Sale of several Lands in the County of Suffolk, the Estate of the Honourable Thomas Sidney Esquire and Mary his Wife; and for purchasing several Lands in the County of Norfolk, of as great or greater Value, and settling the said Lands in Norfolk to the same Uses as the said Lands in Suffolk now stand limited.
Gray's Estate Act 1725	12 Geo. 1. c. 27 Pr.	24 May 1726
An Act for the Sale of several Estates of Henry Grey Esquire, in the County of Southampton; and for settling other Estates, of equal Value, in the Counties of Berks and Wilts, to the same Uses.
Hampden's Estate Act 1725	12 Geo. 1. c. 28 Pr.	24 May 1726
An Act for vesting the Real and Personal Estates of Richard Hampden Esquire in Trustees, for making some Provision for his Wife and Family; and for better securing the Debt due from him to the Crown.
John Burt's Estate Act 1725	12 Geo. 1. c. 29 Pr.	24 May 1726
An Act for Sale of Part of the Estate of John Burt, deceased, in the County of Southampton.
Colclough's Estate Act 1725	12 Geo. 1. c. 30 Pr.	24 May 1726
An Act for vesting certain Lands and Hereditaments in the Kingdom of Ireland (the Estate of Cæsar Colclough Esquire) in Trustees, to be sold or mortgaged, for raising Money, to discharge Incumbrances affecting the same; and for other Purposes therein mentioned.
Bennet's Estate Act 1725	12 Geo. 1. c. 31 Pr.	24 May 1726
An Act for vesting in Trustees the Estate of Thomas Bennett Esquire, in the Counties of Suffolk, Kent, Middlesex, and the City of London, to sell Part thereof, for Payment of his Debts; and for other Purposes therein mentioned.

=== Sources ===
- Pickering, Danby, ed. (1765). "Anno duodecimo Georgii I". The Statutes at Large. Vol. 15: From the Ninth Year of King George I to the Second Year of King George II. Cambridge: Joseph Bentham. pp. 288–368 – via Internet Archive.
- Pickering, Danby, ed. (1765). "Anno duodecimo Georgii I". The Statutes at Large. Vol. 15: From the Ninth Year of King George I to the Second Year of King George II. Cambridge: Joseph Bentham. pp. 288–368 – via Google Books.
- Pickering, Danby, ed. (1765). "Anno duodecimo Georgii I". The Statutes at Large. Vol. 15: From the Ninth Year of King George I to the Second Year of King George II. Cambridge: Joseph Bentham. pp. 288–368 – via Internet Archive.
- Journals of the House of Commons. Vol. 20. London: His Majesty's Stationery Office. 1803. pp. 554–706 – via Google Books.
- Chronological Table of and Index to the Statutes. Vol. 1: To the End of the Session 59 Vict. Sess. 2 (1895) (13th ed.). London: Her Majesty's Stationery Office. 1896. p. 98 – via Google Books.

== See also ==
- List of acts of the Parliament of Great Britain
