= Turnpike trusts in Yorkshire =

Historic road maintenance bodies in England

This is a list of turnpike trusts that maintained roads in Yorkshire.

Between 1663 and 1836, the Parliament of Great Britain and the Parliament of the United Kingdom passed a series of acts of Parliament that created organisations – turnpike trusts – that collected road tolls, and used the money to repair the road. These applied to major roads, around a fifth of the road network. The turnpike system was phased out in the 1870s, and major roads transitioned in the 1880s to the maintenance of the new county councils.

The counties used for these lists are the historic counties of England that existed at the time of the turnpike trusts. This article lists those in Yorkshire, split into the three ridings, North, West and East .

== East Riding ==
Trust	Founded	Initial act	
Trust	Founded	Citation	Title
Beverley to Kendal House Turnpike Trust; Beverley to Kexby Bridge Turnpike Trust	1764	4 Geo. 3. c. 76	Beverley and Kexby Bridge Road Act 1764; An Act for repairing and widening the Road from Beverley to Kexby Bridge, in the County of York.
Beverley, Hessle and North Cave Turnpike Trust	1769	9 Geo. 3. c. 79	Beverley to Hessle Ferry Turnpike Act 1769; An Act for repairing and widening the Road from Beverley to the Ferry at Hessle, and from the Malton Guide Post to the Gravel Pit at Cottingham, in the County of York.
Brough Turnpike Trust; Brough Ferry Turnpike Trust; Elloughton to Coney Clappers Turnpike Trust	1771	11 Geo. 3. c. 71	Yorkshire Roads (No. 3) Act 1771; An Act for repairing and widening the Road from the Low Water Mark of the River Humber, at or near Brough Ferry, in the Parish of Elloughton, in the East Riding of the County of York to the North End of the Town of Brough, and from thence, through South Cave, to Coney Clappers, in South Newbald Holmes, in the said Riding.
Hull and Beverley Turnpike Trust	1743	17 Geo. 2. c. 25	Kingston-upon-Hull and Beverley Road Act 1743; An Act for repairing the Road between the Town of Kingston upon Hull, and the Town of Beverley, in the East Riding of the County of York.
Hull and Hedon Turnpike Trust	1744	18 Geo. 2. c. 6	Hedon and Hull Road Act 1744; An Act for repairing the Road leading from a Gate, commonly called Sacred Gate, on the South East Side of the Town of Hedon, in the East Riding of the County of York, through the said Town, to Hull North Bridge.
Hull and Hessle and Ferriby Turnpike Trust	1825	6 Geo. 4. c. clii	Kingston-upon-Hull and Ferriby Road Act 1825; An Act for making and maintaining a Turnpike Road from the Town of Kingston-upon-Hull, through the Town of Hessle, to the East End of the Town of Ferriby, all in the County of the Town of Kingston-upon-Hull.
Hull and Kirk Ella Turnpike Trust	1744	18 Geo. 2. c. 4	Kingston-upon-Hull Roads Act 1744; An Act for repairing the Road leading from the Town of Kingston upon Hull to and through the Town of Anlaby, and from thence to the Town of Kirk-Ella, in the County of the said Town of Kingston upon Hull.
Molescroft Turnpike Trust; Beverley, Molesworth and Kendale House Turnpike Trust	1766	6 Geo. 3. c. 59	Beverley and Kendell House, and Molescroft and Bainton Balk Roads Act 1766; An Act for repairing and widening the Road from Beverley by Molscroft to Kendell-house, and from Molscroft to Bainion Balk, in the County of York.
Ottringham to Sunk Island Turnpike Trust	1836	6 & 7 Will. 4. c. 91	Road from Sunk Island to Ottringham Act 1836; An Act to enable the Commissioners of His Majesty's Woods, Forests, Land Revenues, Works, and Buildings to make and maintain a Road from the Church in the Parish of Sunk Island to the Town of Ottringham in the East Riding of the County of York.
Patrington Turnpike Trust; Hedon and Patrington Haven Turnpike Trust	1760	1 Geo. 3. c. 35	Sacred Gate and Patrington Creek Road Act 1760; An Act for amending the Road from Sacred Gate in the Parish of Thorngumbald to Pattrington Creek or Haven; and from the Guide Post in Winestead to Frodingham Gate in or near Widow Branton's Farm, in the County of York; and for scouring and cleansing the said Creek or Haven.
White-Cross Turnpike Trust; Leven to Beverley Turnpike Trust	1760	1 Geo. 3. c. 42	White Cross and Beverley Roads Act 1760; An Act for repairing and amending the Road leading from Whitecross in the Parish of Leven in Holderness, in the East Riding of the County of York, to the Town of Beverley in the said County.
Wyton and Flinton Turnpike Trust	1767	7 Geo. 3. c. 71	Hedon and Hull Road Act 1766; An Act to enlarge the Term and Powers of an Act passed in the Eighteenth Year of King George the Second, for repairing the Road from Sacred Gate, on the South East Side of the Town of Hedon, in the East Riding of the County of York, through the said Town, to Hull North Bridge; and for amending the Road from the present Turnpike Bar in Wyton Holmes, through the Townships of Wyton and Sproatley, to the Guide Post in Flinton Lane near Humbleton Moor House, in the same Riding.
York to Kexby Bridge, Grimston and Stonedale End Turnpike Trust	1765	5 Geo. 3. c. 99	Roads from York and from Grimston Act 1765; An Act for amending and widening the Road from the City of York, by Grimston Smithy, to Kexby Bridge, and from Grimston Smithy aforesaid to a certain Gate at the Upper End of Garraby Hill, in the County of York.

== North Riding ==
Trust	Founded	Initial act	
Trust	Founded	Citation	Title
Boroughbridge and Durham Turnpike Trust	1744	18 Geo. 2. c. 8	Boroughbridge and Durham Road Act 1744; An Act for repairing the High Road leading from Boroughbridge, in the County of York, through North-Allerton, in the same County, to Croft Bridge, on the River Tees, and from thence through Darlington, in the County of Durham, to the City of Durham.
Boroughbridge to Catterick Turnpike Trust; Boroughbridge to Catterick and Piercebridge	1742	16 Geo. 2. c. 7	Boroughbridge, Catterick and Piersebridge Road Act 1742; An Act for repairing the High Road from Borough Bridge, in the County of York, to Catherick, in the same County, and from thence to Piers Bridge, on the River Tees.
Malton and Pickering Turnpike Trust	1765	5 Geo. 3. c. 108	Malton and Pickering Road Act 1765; An Act for amending and widening the Road from the North End of Old Malton Gate, in the Town and Borough of New Malton, to the Town of Pickering, in the County of York.
Middleton-tyas Lane to Greta Bridge and Bowes Turnpike Trust	1743	17 Geo. 2. c. 22	Middleton and Bowes Road Act 1743; An Act for repairing the Road leading from the End of Middleton Tyas Lane, over Gatherly Moor, to Greetabridge, and from thence to Bowes, in the North Riding of the County of York.
Red House and Crofton Turnpike Trust	1740	14 Geo. 2. c. 19	Wakefield, etc., Roads Act 1740; An Act for repairing the Roads from a Place called Redhouse, near Doncaster, to Wakefield, and through the said Town of Wakefield, by Dewsbury, Hightoun and Lightcliff, to the Town of Halifax, in the West Riding of the County of York.
Reeth and Tan Hill Turnpike Trust	1769	9 Geo. 3. c. 75	Yorkshire Roads (No. 2) Act 1769; An Act for continuing and rendering more effectual an Act for repairing the Road from Bowes, in the County of York, to Brough under Stainmore, in the County of Westmorland and for repairing and widening the Road from Maiden Castle to Kaber Cross; and Also the Road from Maiden Castle to the Coal Works at Taylor Rig, and to Tan Hill and King's Pitts; and Also the Road from Barrow's Brow to Middle Fell Dyke Nook, in the said Counties; and Also from Tan Hill and King's Pitts to Beck Crooks, and Punchott Pasture West Gate to Whaw Lane Head, and by Lilly Jocks to Reeth.
Richmond and Lancaster Turnpike Trust	1750	24 Geo. 2. c. 17	Richmond and Lancaster Road Act 1750; An Act for repairing the Road leading from the East End of Brumpton High Lane, in the County of York, to the Town of Richmond, and from thence, to and through the Towns of Askrigg and Ingleton, in the said County, to the Town of Lancaster, in the County of Lancaster.
Richmond to Lucy Cross Turnpike Trust; Richmond to Lucy Cross and Gilling Turnpike Trust	1756	29 Geo. 2. c. 91	Richmond to Lancaster Road Act 1756; An Act for explaining and making more effectual an Act, passed in the Twenty-fourth Year of the Reign of His present Majesty, for repairing the Road leading from the East End of Brumpton High Lane in the County of York to the Town of Richmond, and from thence to and through the Towns of Aiskrigg and Ingleton in the said County, to the Town of Lancaster in the County of Lancaster; and also for repairing the Road leading from Richmond aforesaid, through Gilling, Melsonby, and Aldbrough, to Lucy otherwise Lousy Cross, and from Gilling, through Gilling Town Lane, to the Turnpike Road on Gatherly Moor.
Richmond to Reeth Turnpike Trust	1836	6 & 7 Will. 4. c. xvii	Richmond and Reeth Road Act 1836; An Act for making a Turnpike Road from Richmond to Reeth in the County of York.
Thirsk Turnpike Trust	1753	26 Geo. 2. c. 75	Thirsk Roads Act 1753; An Act for widening and repairing the High Road leading from Northallerton to the South Wall of the Church-yard of the Town of Thirsk, and from the South-East End of the Street called Finkell Street in Thirsk aforesaid, to and through the Town of Easingwold in the County of York, to a Place called Burton Stone near the City of York; and also the Road from Thirsk aforesaid to Topcliffe in the North Riding of the County of York.
Thirsk and Masham Turnpike Trust	1755	28 Geo. 2. c. 51	Thirsk, Hutton Moor and Masham Road Act 1755; An Act for repairing and widening the Road from Thirsk, over Skipton Bridge, through Baldersby, to Baldersby Gate adjoining to Hutton Moor in the Way to Ripon; and through Ainderby, Quernbow, and Nosterfield, by Well Flashes Gate, to Masham in the County of York; and likewise for removing the Toll House and Turnpike Gates at Busby Stobb in the said County to some other convenient Place in the Road leading from Boroughbridge to the City of Durham.
Thirsk and Yarm Turnpike Trust	1802	43 Geo. 3. c. ii	Thirsk and Yarm Road Act 1802; An Act for repairing, improving, and maintaining the Road leading from Thirsk to Yarm, in the County of York.
Whitby and Middleton Turnpike Trust	1764	4 Geo. 3. c. 69	Whitby and Middleton Road Act 1764; An Act for repairing and widening the Road from the West End of Baxter Gate in the Town of Whitby, to the South End of Lockton Lane in the Parish of Middleton in the County of York.
Winston Bridge Turnpike Trust; Gatherby Moor to Staindrop Turnpike Trust	1760	1 Geo. 3. c. 41	Yorkshire and Durham Roads Act 1760; An Act for amending and widening the Roads from the Turnpike Road upon Gatherley Moor in the County of York, to Staindrop in the County of Durham; and from the said Turnpike Road near Smallways, across the River Tees, to Winston in the said County of Durham; and for building a Bridge over the said River, at or near Winston Ford.
York to Oswaldkirk Bank Top Turnpike Trust; York to Oswaldkirk Bank Turnpike Trust	1768	8 Geo. 3. c. 54	Yorkshire Roads Act 1768; An Act for amending and widening the Road from the City of York, to the Top of Oswaldkirk Bank, and from the Said Road in Sutton Field, through Craike towards Oulston, to the Extent of the Lordship of Craike, in the County of York.
York to Scarborough Turnpike Trust; York and Scarborough Turnpike Trust	1751	25 Geo. 2. c. 47	Yorkshire Roads Act 1751; An Act for repairing and widening the Roads from the East End of Monk Bridge, near the Suburbs of the City of York, to New Malton, and from thence to Scarborough, in the North Riding of the County of York, and also from Spittlehouse, in the East Riding of the said County, to Scarborough aforesaid.

== West Riding ==
Trust	Founded	Initial act	
Trust	Founded	Citation	Title
Almondbury to Austonley Turnpike Trust; Meltham and Wessenden Head Turnpike Trust	1825	6 Geo. 4. c. ciii	Meltham and Austonley Turnpike Road Act 1825; An Act for making and maintaining a Turnpike Road from Meltham, in the Parish of Almondbury, to the Greenfield and Shepley Lane Head Turnpike Road, near Wessenden Head, in the Township of Austonley, in the West Riding of the County of York.
Balby to Worksop Turnpike Trust	1765	5 Geo. 3. c. 67	Balby to Worksop Road Act 1765; An Act for amending the Road from The Pinfold in Balby in the County of York, to Worksop in the County of Nottingham.
Bampton to Mexborough Turnpike Trust			
Barnby Moor to Rotherham Turnpike Trust	1826	7 Geo. 4. c. xl	Rotherham and Barnby Moor Road Act 1826; An Act for making and maintaining a Turnpike Road from the Great North Road, at Barnby Moor in the County of Nottingham, to the Turnpike Road leading from Bawtry to Tinsley in the County of York, and from the said Bawtry and Tinsley Turnpike Road, at the North East End of Blackhill Lane, to the Town of Rotherham, in the said County of York.
Barnsdale and Leeds Turnpike Trust	1819	59 Geo. 3. c. lxxxi	Barnsdale and Thwaite Gate Turnpike Road Act 1819; An Act for making and maintaining a Turnpike Road to branch off from the Great North Road at the South End of Barnsdale through Pontefract, and from thence to a certain Place called Thwaite Gate, all in the West Riding of the County of York.
Barnsley and Grange Moor Turnpike Trust	1758	32 Geo. 2. c. 70	Yorkshire Roads Act 1758; An Act for repairing and widening the Road leading from the East Side of Barnsley Common, in the County of York, to the Middle of Grange Moor, and from thence to White Cross; and also the Road from the Guide Post in Barugh to a Rivulet called Barugh Brook; and from thence, for Two Hundred Yards over and beyond the same Rivulet or Brook, into the Township of Cawthorne in the said County.
Barnsley and Pontefract Turnpike Trust	1825	6 Geo. 4. c. xlviii	Barnsley and Pontefract Turnpike Road Act 1825; An Act for making and maintaining a Turnpike Road from the Town of Barnsley, by way of Beaver Hole, to Cudworth Bridge, on the present Highway leading to the Town of Pontefract, in the West Riding of the County of York.
Barnsley and Shepley Lane Head Turnpike Trust			
Barnsley to Cudworth Bridge Turnpike Trust			
Bawtry and Selby Turnpike Trust	1793	33 Geo. 3. c. 166	Bawtry by Selby Road Act 1793; An Act for making and maintaining a commodious Carriage Road from the Town of Bawtry to the Town of Selby, in the West Riding of the County of York.
Bawtry and Tinsley Turnpike Trust	1759	33 Geo. 2. c. 55	Yorkshire Roads Act 1759; An Act for amending and widening the Road from Bawtry to Sheffield, and from Sheffield to the South Side of Wortley, in the County of York, where it joins the Turnpike Road leading from Rotherham to Manchester.
Birstall and Huddersfield Turnpike Trust	1765	5 Geo. 3. c. 72	Yorks Roads Act 1765; An Act for amending and widening the Road from the Sign of The Coach and Horses in Birstall to the Turnpike Road at Nunbrook, and from Bradley Lane to the Town of Huddersfield, in the West Riding of the County of York.
Bradford and Eccleshill Turnpike Trust	1825	6 Geo. 4. c. xlii	Eccleshill and Bradford Turnpike Road Act 1825; An Act for making and maintaining a Turnpike Road from Eccleshill to Bradford, in the County of York.
Bradford and Thornton Turnpike Trust	1825	6 Geo. 4. c. cxlix	Leeds and Halifax Turnpike Roads and Branches Act 1825; An Act for repairing, widening improving and maintaining in Repair the Turnpike Roads from Leeds to Halifax, and the several Branches and Roads therein mentioned, in the West Riding of the County of York.
Bradford and Wakefield Turnpike Trust	1753	26 Geo. 2. c. 83	Bradford and Wakefield Road Act 1753; An Act for repairing and widening the Roads from Kighley to Wakefield and Halifax, and from Dudley Hill to Killinghall and the South West Corner of Harrowgate Enclosures; and more effectually to repair the Roads from Leeds to Hallifax, and Bowling Lane, and Little Horton Lane; and for building a Bridge over the River Wharf, at Poole, in the West Riding of the County of York.
Bradford and Wakefield Turnpike Trust	1798	38 Geo. 3. c. xli	Bradford to Wakefield Road Act 1798; An Act for continuing for twenty-one Years, and from thence to the End of the then next Session of Parliament, the Term, and enlarging and altering the Powers, of two Acts, the one passed in the twenty-sixth Year of the Reign of King George the Second, and the other in the seventeenth Year of His present Majesty's Reign, so far as the same relate to the Road from Bradford, through Adwalton, to Wakefield, in the County of York.
Bradford to Colne Turnpike Trust			
Bradford to Heckmondwyke Turnpike Trust			
Brighouse Turnpike Trust			
Brighouse and Denholme Gate Turnpike Trust	1825	6 Geo. 4. c. xliv	Halifax and Bradford Turnpike Road Act 1825; An Act for making and maintaining a Turnpike Road from Brighouse, in the Parish of Halifax, to Denholme Gate, in the Parish of Bradford, in the West Riding of the County of York.
Chadderton to Huddersfield Turnpike Trust			
Collingham and York Turnpike Trust	1771	11 Geo. 3. c. 68	Collingham to York Road Act 1771; An Act for repairing and widening the Road from Collingham; through Wetherby, to the City of York.
Colne to Broughton Turnpike Trust	1824	5 Geo. 4. c. xliv	Road from Colne to Clithero Act 1824; An Act for making and maintaining a Turnpike Road from Colne in the County of Lancaster, to communicate with the Road leading from Clitheroe in the same County, to Skipton in the County of York.
Dewsbury and Elland Turnpike Trust	1758	32 Geo. 2. c. 54	Dewsbury to Elland Road Act 1758; An Act for repairing and widening the Road from Dewsbury to England, in the County of York.
Dewsbury and Leeds Turnpike Trust	1816	56 Geo. 3. c. vi	Road from Dewsbury to Leeds Act 1816; An Act for making and maintaining a Road from Dewsbury to Leeds, in the West Riding of the County of York.
Doncaster and Bawtry Turnpike Trust			
Doncaster and Salter's Brook Turnpike Trust	1740	14 Geo. 2. c. 31	Doncaster to Salter's Brook Road Act 1740; An Act for repairing the Road from Doncaster (through the Parish of Peniston), in the County of York, to Saltersbrooke, in the County of Chester; and also the Road from Rotherham, in the said County of York, to Hartcliffe Hill, in the said Parish of Peniston.
Doncaster and Selby Turnpike Trust	1832	2 & 3 Will. 4. c. lxxxvi	Road from Doncaster to Selby Act 1832; An Act for making and maintaining a Turnpike Road from the Town of Doncaster to the Town and Port of Selby in the West Riding of the County of York.
Doncaster and Tadcaster Turnpike Trust	1740	14 Geo. 2. c. 28	Doncaster and Tadcaster Road Act 1740; An Act for repairing the Roads from Doncaster, through Ferrybridge, to the South Side of Tadcaster Cross, and also from Ferrybridge to Wetherby, and from thence to Borough Bridge, in the County of York.
Doncaster and Tadcaster Turnpike Trust	1788	28 Geo. 3. c. 106	Yorkshire Roads Act 1788; An Act for enlarging the Term and Powers of certain Acts of Parliament, so far as the same relate to the Road from Doncaster through Ferrybridge, to the Southside of Tadcaster Cross in the County of York.
Doncaster and Thorne Turnpike Trust	1825	6 Geo. 4. c. clxxxv	Road from Doncaster to Baln Croft Barn Act 1825; An Act for making and maintaining a Turnpike Road from Doncaster, through Hatfield, to Baln Croft Barn, near Thorne, with One Branch therefrom, in the West Riding of the County of York.
Doncaster to Boroughbridge Turnpike Trust; Doncaster to Boroughbridge and Tadcaster Turnpike Trust	1740	14 Geo. 2. c. 28	Doncaster and Tadcaster Road Act 1740; An Act for repairing the Roads from Doncaster, through Ferrybridge, to the South Side of Tadcaster Cross, and also from Ferrybridge to Wetherby, and from thence to Borough Bridge, in the County of York.
Doncaster to Wakefield Turnpike Trust			
Dudley Hill, Killinghall and Harrogate Turnpike Trust			
Ecclesall to Dore Turnpike Trust; Ecclesall and Fox House Turnpike Trust	1812	52 Geo. 3. c. cxvi	Banner Cross and Fox House Turnpike Road and Branch Act 1812; An Act for making and maintaining a Turnpike Road from or near Banner Cross, in the West Riding of the County of York, through the Township of Dore, to or near to Fox House, in the County of Derby; and also a Branch from Dore aforesaid, to or near to Owler Bridge, in the said County of Derby.
Elland and Saddleworth Turnpike Trust	1825	6 Geo. 4. c. cii	Road from Huddersfield to Rochdale Act 1825; An Act for repairing and maintaining the Road from Huddersfield, in the West Riding of the County of York, to New Hey, in the Parish of Rochdale, in the County of Lancaster, with a Branch to Toothill Lane in the said Riding; and for making a new Road from Buck Stones to the Highway leading from Ripponden to Stainland, at or near to Barkisland School.
Elland and Saddleworth Turnpike Trust	1827	7 & 8 Geo. 4. c. lxx	Road from Buckstones to Barkisland and Elland Bridge (Yorkshire) Act 1827; An Act for more effectually making, amending, and improving the Road from Buck Stones to Barkisland School, at the Highway leading from Ripponden to Stainland; and for making and maintaining an Extension of the said Road to join the Halifax and Huddersfield Turnpike Road at the South End of Elland Bridge, and a Branch therefrom; all in the West Riding of the County of York.
Ferrybridge and Boroughbridge Turnpike Trust	1740	14 Geo. 2. c. 28	Doncaster and Tadcaster Road Act 1740; An Act for repairing the Roads from Doncaster, through Ferrybridge, to the South Side of Tadcaster Cross, and also from Ferrybridge to Wetherby, and from thence to Borough Bridge, in the County of York.
Ferrybridge and Boroughbridge Turnpike Trust	1799	39 Geo. 3. c. x	Ferrybridge, Wetherby and Boroughbridge Road Act 1799; An act for continuing for twenty-one years, and from thence to the end of the then next session of parliament, the term, and altering and enlarging the powers, of three several acts passed in the fourteenth and twenty-sixth years of the reign of his late majesty King George the Second, and in the twenty-third year of the reign of his present Majesty, for repairing the roads from Doncaster, through Ferrybridge, to the south side of Tadcaster Cross, and also from Ferrybridge to Wetherby, and from thence to Boroughbridge, in the county of York, so far as same relate to the road between Ferrybridge and Wetherby, and from thence to Boroughbridge.
Godley Lane Turnpike Trust	1824	5 Geo. 4. c. cvi	Road from Godley Lane Head (Yorkshire, West Riding) Act 1824; An Act for making and maintaining a Turnpike Road from Godley Lane Head, near Halifax, to Northowram Green in the West Riding of the County of York.
Gomersal and Dewsbury Turnpike Trust	1826	7 Geo. 4. c. xciii	Gomersal and Dewsbury Roads (Yorks. West Riding) Act 1826; An Act for making and maintaining a Turnpike Road from Gomersal to Dewsbury in the West Riding of the County of York, with Two Branch Roads therefrom.
Greenfield and Shepley Lane Head Turnpike Trust	1823	4 Geo. 4. c. lviii	Greenfield and Shepley Lane Head Road (Yorkshire, West Riding) Act 1823; An Act for making and maintaining a Turnpike Road from Holehouse or Riding, near Greenfield in Saddleworth, to join the Stayley Turnpike Road, and also to join the Halifax and Sheffield Turnpike Road, all in the West Riding of the County of York.
Halifax and Huddersfield Turnpike Trust	1777	17 Geo. 3. c. 106	Halifax to Sheffield Road Act 1777; An Act for repairing and widening the Road from the Town of Halifax, in the West Riding of the County of York, to the Town of Sheffield, in the same Riding.
Halifax and Huddersfield Turnpike Trust	1793	33 Geo. 3. c. 142	Halifax to Sheffield Road Act 1793; An Act for continuing the Term, and altering and enlarging the Powers of an Act of Parliament, of the Seventeenth Year of His present Majesty, for repairing and widening the Road from the Town of Halifax, in the West Riding of the County of York, to the Town of Sheffield in the same Riding, so far as relates to the first District of the Roads mentioned in the said Act.
Halifax and Sheffield Turnpike Trust	1777	17 Geo. 3. c. 106	Halifax to Sheffield Road Act 1777; An Act for repairing and widening the Road from the Town of Halifax, in the West Riding of the County of York, to the Town of Sheffield, in the same Riding.
Halifax to Dewsbury Turnpike Trust			
Harrogate and Boroughbridge Turnpike Trust	1751	25 Geo. 2. c. 58	Yorkshire Roads (No. 3) Act 1751; An Act for repairing the Roads from the Town of Leeds, through Harwood, to the South West Corner of the Enclosures of Harrogate, and from thence, in Two Branches, one through Ripley over Burage Green, and the other through Knaresborough and Borough Bridge, to Ripon, and from thence to the First Rill of Water, or Water-course, on Hutton Moor, in the County of York, and for repairing the Sloughs or Ruts on the said Moor.
Harrogate and Boroughbridge Turnpike Trust	1777	17 Geo. 3. c. 77	Yorks Roads (No. 2) Act 1777; An Act to enlarge the Term and Powers of an Act, made in the Twenty-fifth Year of the Reign of His late Majesty, for repairing the Roads from the Town of Leeds, through Harwood, to the South-west Corner of the Enclosures of Harrogate, and from thence in Two Branches, (One through Ripley over Burage Green, and the other through Knaresborough and Boroughbridge), to Ripon, and from thence to the First Rill of Water or Watercourse on Hutton Moor, in the County of York, and for repairing the Sloughs or Rutts on the said Moor; so far as the same relates to the Road leading from the South-west Corner of the Enclosures of Harrogate, through Knaresborough, to Boroughbridge.
Harrogate and Hewick Turnpike Trust	1751	25 Geo. 2. c. 58	Yorkshire Roads (No. 3) Act 1751; An Act for repairing the Roads from the Town of Leeds, through Harwood, to the South West Corner of the Enclosures of Harrogate, and from thence, in Two Branches, one through Ripley over Burage Green, and the other through Knaresborough and Borough Bridge, to Ripon, and from thence to the First Rill of Water, or Water-course, on Hutton Moor, in the County of York, and for repairing the Sloughs or Ruts on the said Moor.
Harrogate and Hewick Turnpike Trust	1777	17 Geo. 3. c. 80	Yorks Roads (No. 4) Act 1777; An Act for enlarging the Term and Powers of Two Acts of Parliament, One passed in the Twenty fifth Year of the Reign of His late Majesty King George the Second, intituled, "An Act for repairing the Roads from the Town of Leeds through Harwood, to the South West Corner of the Enclosures of Harrogate; and from thence in Two Branches, (One through Ripley over Burage Green, and the other through Knaresborough and Boroughbridge), to Ripon, and from thence to the First Rill of Water or Watercourse on Hutton Moor, in the County of York; and for repairing the Sloughs or Rutts on the said Moor;" and the other, passed in the Twenty-ninth Year of His said Majesty's Reign, to explain and amend the said first-mentioned Act, with respect to those Parts of the said Roads from Harrogate through Ripley and Ripon, to the North East Corner of Hutton Moor, and from the East End of Kirby Hill Moor to the Town of Ripon aforesaid.
Haworth and Two Laws Turnpike Trust	1755	28 Geo. 2. c. 50	Yorkshire Roads Act 1755; An Act for amending and widening the Roads from the West End of Toller Lane, near Bradford, through Haworth, in the County of York, to a Place called Blue Bell near Colne in the County of Lancaster, and from a Place called The Two Laws to Kighley in the said County of York.
Holme Lane End and Heckmondwyke Turnpike Trust	1824	5 Geo. 4. c. xc	Holme Lane End and Heckmondwike Road (Yorkshire, West Riding) Act 1824; An Act for making and maintaining a Turnpike Road from the Turnpike Road leading from Bradford to Wakefield in the West Riding of the County of York, near Holme Lane End, in the Parish of Birstal in the said Riding, to the Turnpike Road leading from Birstal to Huddersfield in the said Riding, at the Township of Heckmondwike, in the Parish of Birstal aforesaid, with a Branch Road therefrom.
Huddersfield and New Hey Turnpike Trust	1806	46 Geo. 3. c. xiii	Road from Huddersfield to Rochdale Act 1806; An Act for making and maintaining a Road from the Town of Huddersfield, in the West Riding of the County of York, to a Place called New Hey, in the Parish of Rochdale, in the County Palatine of Lancaster, and for making and maintaining certain Branches of Road to communicate therewith.
Huddersfield and Penistone Turnpike Trust	1777	17 Geo. 3. c. 106	Halifax to Sheffield Road Act 1777; An Act for repairing and widening the Road from the Town of Halifax, in the West Riding of the County of York, to the Town of Sheffield, in the same Riding.
Huddersfield and Penistone Turnpike Trust	1798	38 Geo. 3. c. xxiii	Huddersfield and Penistone Road Act 1798; An Act for continuing for twenty-one Years, and from thence to the End of the then next Session of Parliament, the Term, and altering and enlarging the Powers, of an Act passed in the seventeenth Year of the Reign of His present Majesty, for repairing and widening the Road from the Town of Halifax, in the West Riding of the County of York, to the Town of Sheffield, in the same Riding, so far as relates to the Road from Huddersfield to Penistone.
Huddersfield and Woodhead Turnpike Trust	1768	8 Geo. 3. c. 47	Yorks and Derby Roads Act 1768; An Act for diverting, altering, widening, repairing, and amending the Road from Huddersfield in the West Riding of the County of York, to Woodhead in the County Palatine of Chester; and from thence to a Bridge over the River Mersey, called Enterclough Bridge, on the Confines of the County of Derby.
Hunslet and Leeds Turnpike Trust	1828	9 Geo. 4. c. lxvii	Road from Hunslet to Leeds Act 1828; An Act for making a Turnpike Road from the Township of Hunslet, across the River Aire, to the Township of Leeds, together with a Branch therefrom, all in the West Riding of the County of York.
Keighley and Bradford Turnpike Trust	1753	26 Geo. 2. c. 83	Bradford and Wakefield Road Act 1753; An Act for repairing and widening the Roads from Kighley to Wakefield and Halifax, and from Dudley Hill to Killinghall and the South West Corner of Harrowgate Enclosures; and more effectually to repair the Roads from Leeds to Hallifax, and Bowling Lane, and Little Horton Lane; and for building a Bridge over the River Wharf, at Poole, in the West Riding of the County of York.
Keighley and Halifax Turnpike Trust	1753	26 Geo. 2. c. 83	Bradford and Wakefield Road Act 1753; An Act for repairing and widening the Roads from Kighley to Wakefield and Halifax, and from Dudley Hill to Killinghall and the South West Corner of Harrowgate Enclosures; and more effectually to repair the Roads from Leeds to Hallifax, and Bowling Lane, and Little Horton Lane; and for building a Bridge over the River Wharf, at Poole, in the West Riding of the County of York.
Keighley and Kendal Turnpike Trust	1753	26 Geo. 2. c. 86	Yorkshire and Westmorland Roads Act 1753; An Act for repairing, amending, and widening, the Road from Keighley in the West Riding of the County of York, to Kirkby in Kendal in the County of Westmorland.
Keighley and Kendal Turnpike Trust	1778	18 Geo. 3. c. 113	Keighley to Kirkby Kendal Road Act 1778; An Act for continuing the Term, and altering and enlarging the Powers of an Act, made in the Twenty-sixth Year of the Reign of His late Majesty King George the Second, intituled, "An Act for repairing, amending and widening the Road from Keighley, in the West Riding of the County of York, to Kirkby in Kendal, in the County of Westmorland."
Kirkgate to Westgate in Wakefield Turnpike Trust			
Kirkstall, Ilkley and Shipley Turnpike Trust; Kirkstall, Otley and Shipley Turnpike Trust	1825	6 Geo. 4. c. cxlix	Leeds and Halifax Turnpike Roads and Branches Act 1825; An Act for repairing, widening improving and maintaining in Repair the Turnpike Roads from Leeds to Halifax, and the several Branches and Roads therein mentioned, in the West Riding of the County of York.
Knaresborough and Pateley Bridge Turnpike Trust	1758	32 Geo. 2. c. 71	Wetherby to Grassington Road Act 1758; An Act for repairing and widening the High Road from Wetherby to Grassington, in the County of York.
Knaresborough and Pateley Bridge Turnpike Trust	1806	46 Geo. 3. c. vii	Road from Wetherby to Grassington Act 1806; An Act for continuing the Term, and altering the Powers, of Three Acts, passed in the Thirty second Year of His late Majesty, and in the Fourteenth and Twentieth Years of His present Majesty, for repairing the Road from Wetherby to Grassington, in the County of York, so far as the said Acts relate to the Road from Knaresborough, to the Junction of the Road from Ripon to Pately Bridge.
Knaresborough to Green Hammerton Turnpike Trust	1751	25 Geo. 2. c. 53	Knaresborough and Green Hammerton Road Act 1751; An Act for repairing the Road from Knaresborough, in the County of York, by Longflat Lane, Gouldsborough Fields, Flaxby, Allerton Maulenerer, and Scate Moor, to Green Hammerton, in the same County, and for making the same a High Carriage Road.
Leeds and Birstall Turnpike Trust	1825	6 Geo. 4. c. xcvii	Road from Leeds to Whitehall (Yorkshire) Act 1825; An Act for making and maintaining a new Road from Leeds to Whitehall, near Halifax, and several Branch Roads therefrom, all in the West Riding of the County of York.
Leeds and Collingham Turnpike Trust	1824	5 Geo. 4. c. lxxxii	Leeds and Collingham Turnpike Act 1824; An Act for making and maintaining a Turnpike Road from Roundhay Bridge to Collingham in the County of York.
Leeds and Elland Turnpike Trust	1740	14 Geo. 2. c. 25	Elland to Leeds Road Act 1740; An Act for repairing the Road leading from Eland, to the Town of Leeds, in the West Riding of the County of York.
Leeds and Halifax Turnpike Trust	1740	14 Geo. 2. c. 32	Leeds and Halifax Roads Act 1740; An Act for repairing and enlarging the Roads from the Town of Selby, in the West Riding of the County of York, to the Town of Leeds, and from thence (in Two several Branches, One through Bradford and Horton, and the other through Bowling and Wibsey), to the Town of Halifax, in the same Riding.
Leeds and Harrogate Turnpike Trust	1751	25 Geo. 2. c. 58	Yorkshire Roads (No. 3) Act 1751; An Act for repairing the Roads from the Town of Leeds, through Harwood, to the South West Corner of the Enclosures of Harrogate, and from thence, in Two Branches, one through Ripley over Burage Green, and the other through Knaresborough and Borough Bridge, to Ripon, and from thence to the First Rill of Water, or Water-course, on Hutton Moor, in the County of York, and for repairing the Sloughs or Ruts on the said Moor.
Leeds and Harrogate Turnpike Trust	1777	17 Geo. 3. c. 78	Yorks Roads (No. 3) Act 1777; An Act for enlarging the Term, and continuing the Powers of Two Acts of Parliament, One passed in the Twenty-fifth Year of the Reign of His late Majesty King George the Second, intituled, "An Act for repairing the Roads from the Town of Leeds, through Harwood, to the South-west Corner of the Enclosures of Harrogate, and from thence in Two Branches (One through Ripley, over Burage Green, and the other through Knaresborough and Boroughbridge) to Ripon, and from thence to the First Rill of Water or Watercourse on Hutton Moor, in the County of York; and for repairing the Sloughs or Rutts on the said Moor;" and the other, passed in the Twenty-ninth Year of His said Majesty's Reign, to explain and amend the said first-mentioned Act, with respect to the Road from the Town of Leeds, through Harwood, to the South-west Corner of the Enclosures of Harrogate.
Leeds and Hebdon Bridge Turnpike Trust			
Leeds and Holmfield Lane End Turnpike Trust	1817	57 Geo. 3. c. li	Leeds and Homefield Lane End Road Act 1817; An Act for making and maintaining a Road from Quebec, in the Parish of Leeds, in the West Riding of the County of York, to Homefield Lane End, in the same Parish, with a Bridge or Bridges on the Line of such Road.
Leeds and Otley Turnpike Trust	1755	28 Geo. 2. c. 60	Leeds to Otley Road Act 1755; An Act for repairing and widening the Roads from the Town of Leeds in the West Riding of the County of York, through Otley, Skipton, Colne, Burnley, and Blackburn, to Burscough Bridge in Walton in the County of Lancaster, and from Skipton, through Gisburn and Clitheroe, to Preston in the said County of Lancaster.
Leeds and Otley Turnpike Trust	1781	21 Geo. 3. c. 98	Leeds to Otley Road Act 1781; An Act to enlarge the Term and Powers of an Act passed in the Twenty-eighth Year of the Reign of His late Majesty King George the Second, for repairing several Roads, so far as relates to the Road from Leeds to Otley, in the West Riding of the County of York.
Leeds and Roundhay Turnpike Trust	1808	48 Geo. 3. c. xv	Road from Leeds to Roundhay Act 1808; An Act for making and maintaining a Road from Leeds to Rounday in the West Riding of the County of York.
Leeds and Selby Turnpike Trust			
Leeds and Tong Lane End Turnpike Trust			
Leeds and Wakefield Turnpike Trust	1757	31 Geo. 2. c. 63	Leeds and Wakefield Road Act 1757; An Act for repairing the Road from Leeds to Sheffield, in the County of York.
Leeds and Whitehall Turnpike Trust	1825	6 Geo. 4. c. xcvii	Road from Leeds to Whitehall (Yorkshire) Act 1825; An Act for making and maintaining a new Road from Leeds to Whitehall, near Halifax, and several Branch Roads therefrom, all in the West Riding of the County of York.
Leeds to Sheffield Turnpike Trust	1757	31 Geo. 2. c. 63	Leeds and Wakefield Road Act 1757; An Act for repairing the Road from Leeds to Sheffield, in the County of York.
Leeds, Woodhouse Carr and Meanwoodside Turnpike Trust	1829	10 Geo. 4. c. lxxxvii	Road from Sheepscar to Meanwoodside Act 1829; An Act for making and maintaining a Road from Sheepscar, through Woodhouse Carr, to Meanwoodside in the Parish of Leeds in the West Riding of the County of York.
Liversedge to Cleckheaton Turnpike Trust	1806	46 Geo. 3. c. xvii	Millbridge and Cleckheaton Road Act 1806; An Act for making and maintaining a Road from Millbridge to Cleckheaton, in the Parish of Birstall, all in the West Riding of the County of York.
Lockwood and Meltham Turnpike Trust	1818	58 Geo. 3. c. xli	Road from Lockwood to Meltham Act 1818; An Act for making and maintaining a Road from Lockwood to Meltham, and a Branch of Road to Meltham Mills, all in the Parish of Almondbury, in the West Riding of the County of York.
Long Preston to Sawley Turnpike Trust	1811	51 Geo. 3. c. cxi	Long Preston and Sawley Road Act 1811; An Act for making and maintaining a Road from Long Preston to Sawley, in the West Riding of the County of York.
Maltby to Barnby Moor Turnpike Trust			
Meltham and Wessenden Head Turnpike Trust	1825	6 Geo. 4. c. ciii	Meltham and Austonley Turnpike Road Act 1825; An Act for making and maintaining a Turnpike Road from Meltham, in the Parish of Almondbury, to the Greenfield and Shepley Lane Head Turnpike Road, near Wessenden Head, in the Township of Austonley, in the West Riding of the County of York.
Mytholmroyd and Blackstone-edge Turnpike Trust	1815	55 Geo. 3. c. xxxii	Mytholmroyd Bridge Turnpike Road Act 1815; An Act for making and maintaining a Turnpike Road from or near Mytholm Royd Bridge, in the West Riding of the County of York, to communicate with the Road at or near the Sixth Milestone from Rochdale, in the County of Lancaster.
Penistone to Grindleford (Mortimer Road) Turnpike Trust			
Ripon and Pateley Bridge Turnpike Trust	1756	29 Geo. 2. c. 83	Ripon and Pateley Bridge Road Act 1756; An Act for repairing and widening the High Road from the Borough of Ripon, by Ingram Bank, to the Town of Pately Bridge, in the County of York.
Rochdale to Halifax and Elland Turnpike Trust	1734	8 Geo. 2. c. 7	Rochdale, Halifax and Ealand Road Act 1734; An Act for repairing and widening the Road from the Town of Rochdale, in the County Palatine of Lancaster, leading over a certain craggy Mountain, called Blackstone Edge, in the same County; and from thence to the Towns of Hallifax and Ealand, in the County of York.
Rotherham and Four Lane Ends Turnpike Trust	1740	14 Geo. 2. c. 31	Doncaster to Salter's Brook Road Act 1740; An Act for repairing the Road from Doncaster (through the Parish of Peniston), in the County of York, to Saltersbrooke, in the County of Chester; and also the Road from Rotherham, in the said County of York, to Hartcliffe Hill, in the said Parish of Peniston.
Rotherham and Pleasley Turnpike Trust	1764	4 Geo. 3. c. 65	Derby and Yorkshire Roads Act 1764; An Act for amending and widening the Road from the South End of the Town of Rotherham in the County of York, to the present Turnpike Road near Pleasley in the County of Derby; and also the Road from the North End of the said Town of Rotherham into the present Turnpike Road on the East Side of Tankersley Park in the said County of York.
Rotherham and Pleasley Turnpike Trust	1826	7 Geo. 4. c. lxxxviii	Rotherham and Pleasley Turnpike Road Act 1826; An Act for amending, repairing and maintaining the Turnpike Road from the South End of the Town of Rotherham in the County of York, to the present Turnpike Road near Pleasley in the County of Derby.
Rotherham and Swinton Turnpike Trust	1809	49 Geo. 3. c. v	Rotherham and Swinton Road Act 1809; An Act for making and maintaining a Road from Rotherham to Swinton, in the West Riding of the County of York.
Rotherham and Wentworth Turnpike Trust	1764	4 Geo. 3. c. 65	Derby and Yorkshire Roads Act 1764; An Act for amending and widening the Road from the South End of the Town of Rotherham in the County of York, to the present Turnpike Road near Pleasley in the County of Derby; and also the Road from the North End of the said Town of Rotherham into the present Turnpike Road on the East Side of Tankersley Park in the said County of York.
Rotherham and Wentworth Turnpike Trust	1827	7 & 8 Geo. 4. c. lviii	Rotherham and Swinton Turnpike Road (Yorkshire, West Riding) Act 1827; An Act for amending, repairing, and maintaining the Turnpike Road from Rotherham to Swinton, in the West Riding of the County of York.
Roundhay to Collingham Turnpike Trust			
Saddleworth to Thornsett Turnpike Trust			
Salterhebble, Stainland and Sowerby Bridge Turnpike Trust			
Sedbergh Turnpike Trust	1762	2 Geo. 3. c. 83	Lancaster and Westmorland Roads Act 1762; An Act for repairing and widening the Roads from Kirby-Steven High-Lane Head in the County of Westmorland, through Sedbergh, to Greeta Bridge in the County Palatine of Lancaster, and from Bracken Bar Gate near Askrigg in the County of York, through Sedbergh, to Kirby Kendal; and also the Road from The Four Lane Ends in Marthwaite, to the Turnpike Road on Grayrigg House, leading from Appleby to Kirkby Kendal in the said County of Westmorland.
Selby and Market Weighton Turnpike Trust			
Sheepscar to Leeds Turnpike Trust			
Sheffield to Hathersage Turnpike Trust	1818	58 Geo. 3. c. xxxv	Sheffield and Glossop Road Act 1818; An Act for making and maintaining a Road from the Town of Sheffield, in the County of York, to join the Marple Bridge Road in the Parish of Glossop, in the County of Derby, with a Branch to Mortimer's Road, in the Parish of Hathersage, in the said County of Derby.
Shipley and Bramley Turnpike Trust	1826	7 Geo. 4. c. cxxix	Shipley and Bramley Road (Yorkshire) Act 1826; An Act for making a Turnpike Road from Shipley to Brantley, together with certain Branches therefrom, in the West Riding of the County of York.
Shipley to Caisthorne Turnpike Trust			
Skipton and Clitheroe Turnpike Trust	1755	28 Geo. 2. c. 60	Leeds to Otley Road Act 1755; An Act for repairing and widening the Roads from the Town of Leeds in the West Riding of the County of York, through Otley, Skipton, Colne, Burnley, and Blackburn, to Burscough Bridge in Walton in the County of Lancaster, and from Skipton, through Gisburn and Clitheroe, to Preston in the said County of Lancaster.
Skipton and Clitheroe Turnpike Trust	1781	21 Geo. 3. c. 95	Skipton Roads Act 1781; An Act for continuing the Term, and altering and enlarging the Powers of so much of an Act made in the Twenty-eighth Year of the Reign of His late Majesty King George the Second, for repairing and widening certain Roads therein described, as relate to the Roads from Otley to Skipton, in the County of York, from Skipton to Colne, in the County of Lancaster, and from Skipton to Clitheroe, in the said County.
Skipton Roads Act 1781: Skipton and Knaresborough Turnpike Trust	1777	17 Geo. 3. c. 102	Yorks Roads (No. 5) Act 1777; An Act for repairing and widening the Road from the Town of Skipton, to the Turnpike Road leading from Leeds to Ripon near Okbeck, in the Township of Bilton with Harrogate, and from thence to communicate with the Road leading from Knaresborough to Wetherby, in the West Riding of the County of York.
Skipton and Otley Turnpike Trust	1755	28 Geo. 2. c. 60	Leeds to Otley Road Act 1755; An Act for repairing and widening the Roads from the Town of Leeds in the West Riding of the County of York, through Otley, Skipton, Colne, Burnley, and Blackburn, to Burscough Bridge in Walton in the County of Lancaster, and from Skipton, through Gisburn and Clitheroe, to Preston in the said County of Lancaster.
Standedge and Oldham Turnpike Trust			
Swinton, Rawmarsh and Hooton Roberts Turnpike Trust			
Tadcaster Bridge to Hob-moor Lane End Turnpike Trust	1744	18 Geo. 2. c. 16	Tadcaster Bridge and Hob Moor Lane Road Act 1744; An Act to repair the Road leading from Tadcaster Bridge, within the County of the City of York, to a Place near the said City, called Hobmoor Lane End.
Tadcaster and Halton Dial Turnpike Trust	1750	24 Geo. 2. c. 22	Tadcaster, etc., Roads Act 1750; An Act for explaining and amending so much of an Act passed in the Fourteenth Year of the Reign of His present Majesty, for the repairing and enlarging the Roads from the Town of Selby, in the West Riding of the County of York, to the Town of Leeds, and from thence in Two several Branches, one through Bradford and Horton, and the other through Bowling and Wibsey, to the Town of Halifax, in the same Riding, as relates to that Part of the said Roads which lies between Selby and Leeds, and also for repairing the Road from Tadcaster, in the said West Riding, over Bramham Moor, through Kiddell Lane, over Win Moor, and through Seacroft, to a Place called Halton Dyal, where it comes into the abovesaid Road between Selby and Leeds.
Tadcaster and Otley Turnpike Trust	1753	26 Geo. 2. c. 64	Tadcaster and Otley Road Act 1753; An Act for repairing and widening the Road from Tadcaster, through Newton, Collingham, Harewood, Arthington, and Pool, to Otley, in the West Riding of the County of York.
Tinsley and Doncaster Turnpike Trust	1764	4 Geo. 3. c. 64	Tinsley and Doncaster Road Act 1764; An Act for amending and widening the Road from Tinsley in the County of York, to the Town of Doncaster in the said County.
Todmorden Turnpike Trust; Halifax to Littleborough Turnpike Trust	1759	33 Geo. 2. c. 48	Yorks and Lancaster Roads Act 1759; An Act for diverting, altering, widening, repairing, and amending, the Roads from the Town of Halifax, and from Sowerby Bridge, in the County of York, by Todmorden, to Burnley and Littleborough, in the County of Lancaster.
Wadsley and Langsett Turnpike Trust; Wadsley, Langsett and Sheffield Turnpike Trust	1805	45 Geo. 3. c. cvii	Wadsley and Langset Road Act 1805; An Act for making and keeping in Repair, a Carriage Road, to branch out of the Sheffield and Peniston Turnpike Road in the Township of Wadsley, in the West Riding of the County of York, to join the Doncaster and Salter's Brook Turnpike Road in the Township of Langset, in the said West Riding.
Wakefield and Aberford Turnpike Trust	1789	29 Geo. 3. c. 86	Wakefield to Abberford Road Act 1789; An Act for repairing and widening the Road from the Town of Wakefield, to the Town of Abberford, in the West Riding of the County of York.
Wakefield and Austerlands Turnpike Trust	1758	32 Geo. 2. c. 48	Wakefield to Austerlands Road Act 1758; An Act for repairing the Road from Wakefield to Austerlands, in The West Riding of the County of York.
Wakefield and Denby Dale Turnpike Trust	1825	6 Geo. 4. c. xxxviii	Wakefield and Denby Dale Turnpike Road Act 1825; An Act for making and maintaining a Turnpike Road from Wakefield, to join the Shepley Lane Head Turnpike Road in Denby Dale, in the Parish of Penistone, with certain Branches, all in the West Riding of the County of York.
Wakefield and Halifax Turnpike Trust	1740	14 Geo. 2. c. 19	Wakefield, etc., Roads Act 1740; An Act for repairing the Roads from a Place called Redhouse, near Doncaster, to Wakefield, and through the said Town of Wakefield, by Dewsbury, Hightoun and Lightcliff, to the Town of Halifax, in the West Riding of the County of York.
Wakefield and Sheffield Turnpike Trust	1757	31 Geo. 2. c. 63	Leeds and Wakefield Road Act 1757; An Act for repairing the Road from Leeds to Sheffield, in the County of York.
Wakefield and Weeland Turnpike Trust	1740	14 Geo. 2. c. 23	Yorkshire Roads Act 1740; An Act for repairing the Road from Wakefield to Pontefract, and from thence to a Place called Weeland, in the Township of Hensall, and from Pontefract to Wentbridge, in the Township of Darrington, in the West Riding of the County of York.
Wakefield to Pontefract Turnpike Trust			
Wellington to Tong Lane End Turnpike Trust	1825	6 Geo. 4. c. iii	Road from Wellington Bridge Road to Tong Lane End (Yorkshire) Act 1825; An Act for making and maintaining a Turnpike Road from the Turnpike Road called Wellington Bridge Road, near the Town of Leeds, in the West Riding of the County of York, to the Turnpike Road leading from Wakefield to Bradford, in the said Riding, near a certain Place called Tong Lane End, in the Lordship or Liberty of Tong, in the Parish of Birstal, in the Riding aforesaid, with several Branch Roads therefrom.
Wetherby and Knaresborough Turnpike Trust	1758	32 Geo. 2. c. 71	Wetherby to Grassington Road Act 1758; An Act for repairing and widening the High Road from Wetherby to Grassington, in the County of York.
Wibsey, Low Moor and Huddersfield Turnpike Trust; Bradford and Huddersfield Turnpike Trust	1823	4 Geo. 4. c. liv	Bradford and Huddersfield Road and Branches Act 1823; An Act for making and maintaining a Turnpike Road from Wibsey Low Moor, near Bradford, through Brighouse to Huddersfield, with Three Diversions or Branches from such Road, in the West Riding of the County of York.
Worksop and Attercliffe Turnpike Trust	1764	4 Geo. 3. c. 52	Worksop and Attercliffe Road Act 1764; An Act for repairing and widening the Road from Worksop in the County of Nottingham, through the Towns of Galeforth, Anston, Aston, Handsworth, and Darnall, to the North East End of Attercliffe in the County of York, where the same joins the Turnpike Road from Bawtry to Sheffield.
York and Boroughbridge Turnpike Trust	1749	23 Geo. 2. c. 38	York and Boroughbridge Road Act 1749; An Act for repairing the Road from the City of York, over Skipbridge, to Boroughbridge, in the County of York.
