= Turnpike trust =

Bodies established to run toll roads and improve transport routes

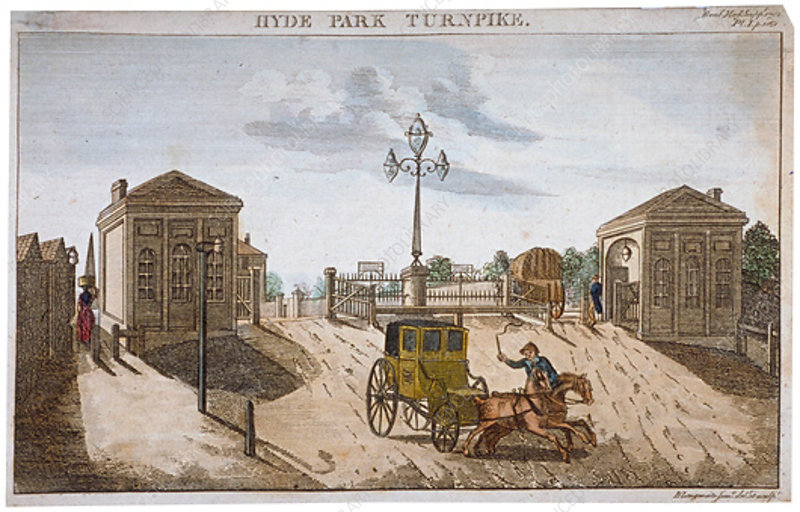
The Hyde Park Gate in London, erected by the Kensington Turnpike Trust. This was the first toll point encountered along the Bath Road, upon leaving London.

Turnpike trusts were bodies set up by individual acts of Parliament, with powers to collect road tolls for maintaining the principal roads in Britain from the 17th but especially during the 18th and 19th centuries. At the peak, in the 1830s, over 1,000 trusts administered around 30,000 miles (48,000 km) of turnpike road in England and Wales, taking tolls at almost 8,000 toll-gates and side-bars.

During the early 19th century the concept of the turnpike trust was adopted and adapted to manage roads within the British Empire (Ireland, Canada, Australia, New Zealand, India, and South Africa) and in the United States.

Turnpikes declined with the coming of the railways and then the Local Government Act 1888 gave responsibility for maintaining main roads to county councils and county borough councils.

== Etymology ==
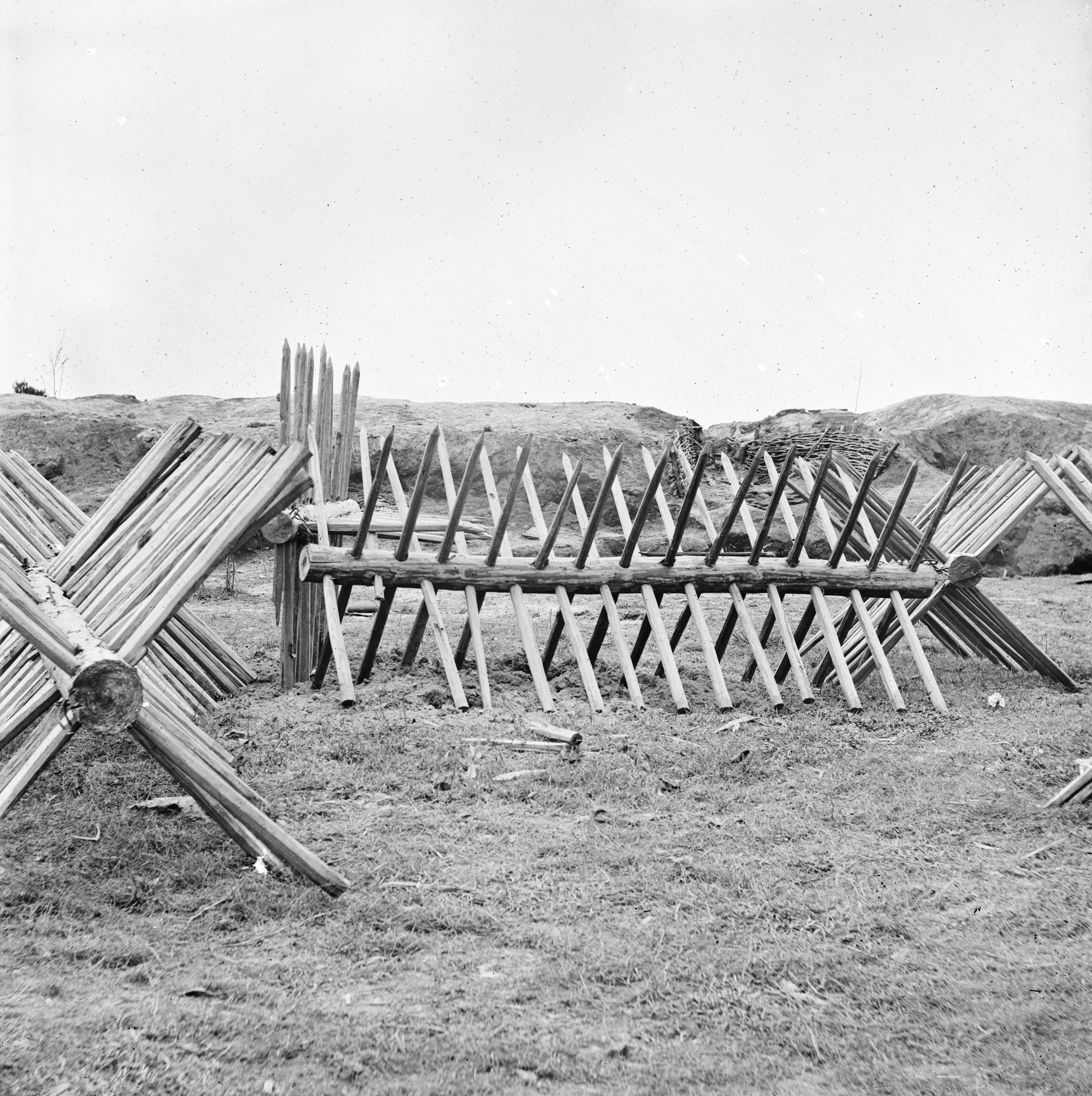
Chevaux de frise, Siege of Petersburg, American Civil War

The term "turnpike" originates from the similarity of the gate used to control access to the road, to the barriers once used to defend against attack by cavalry (see cheval de frise). The turnpike consisted of a row of pikes or bars, each sharpened at one end, and attached to horizontal members which were secured at one end to an upright pole or axle, which could be rotated to open or close the gate.

== Precursors to turnpike trusts ==
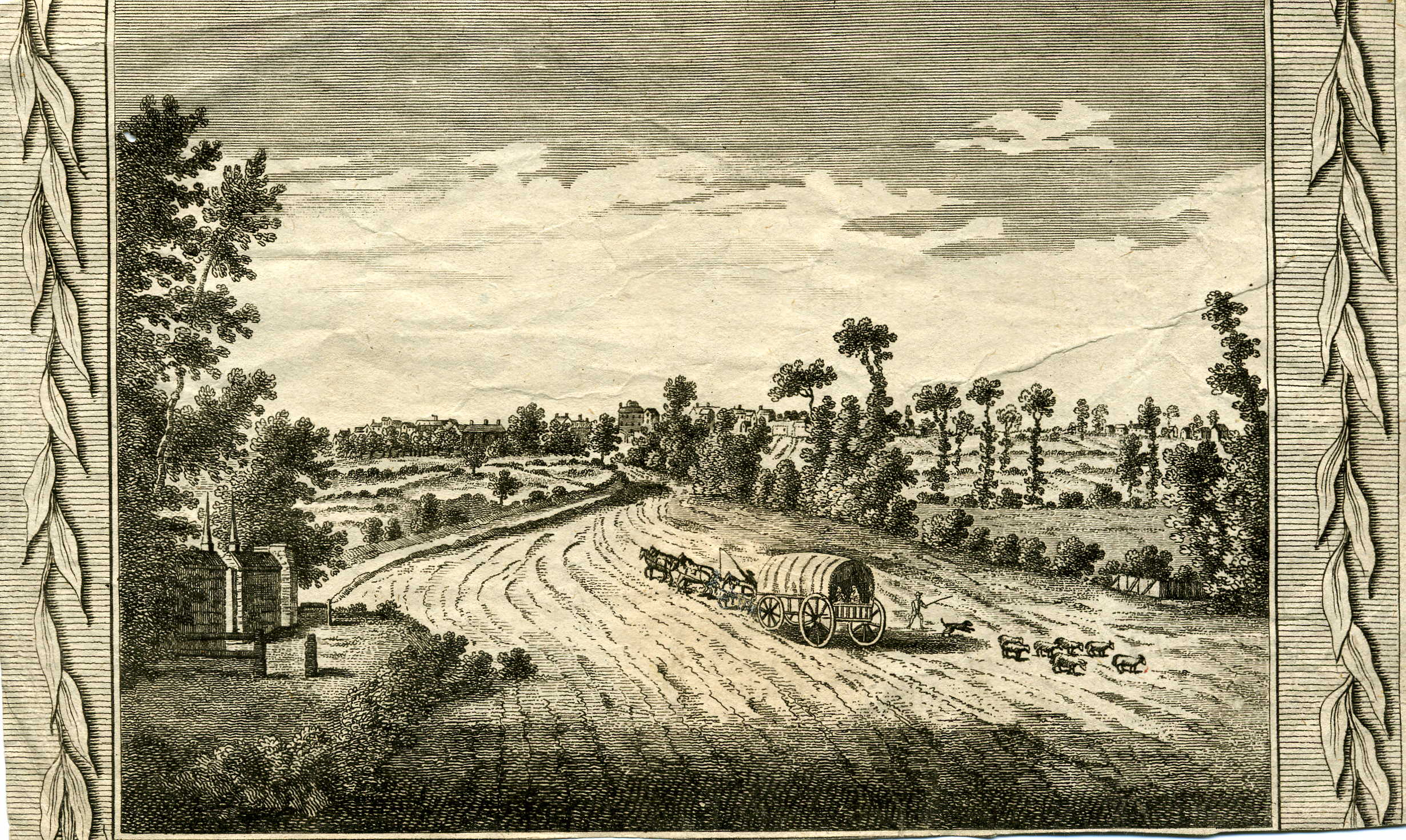
The Great North Road near Highgate on the approach to London before turnpiking. The highway was deeply rutted and spread onto adjoining land.

Pavage grants, originally made for paving the marketplace or streets of towns, began also to be used for maintaining some roads between towns in the 14th century. These grants were made by letters patent, almost invariably for a limited term, presumably the time likely to be required to pay for the required works.

Tudor statutes had placed responsibility on each parish vestry to maintain all its roads. This arrangement was adequate for roads that the parishioners used themselves but proved unsatisfactory for the principal highways that were used by long-distance travellers and waggoners. During the 17th century, the piecemeal approach to road maintenance caused acute problems on the main routes into London. As trade increased, the growing numbers of heavy carts and carriages led to serious deterioration in the state of these roads and this could not be remedied by the use of parish statute labour. A parliamentary bill was tabled in 1621/22 to relieve the parishes responsible for part of the Great North Road by imposing a scale of tolls on various sorts of traffic. The toll revenue was to be used in repairing the road, however, the bill was defeated. During the following forty years, the idea of making travellers contribute to the repair of roads was raised on several occasions.

Road Repair (Hertfordshire, Cambridgeshire, and Huntingdonshire) Act 1663
- Act of Parliament
- Parliament of England
- Long title: An Act for repairing the Highwayes within the Countyes of Hertford Cambridge and Huntington.
- Citation: 15 Cha. 2. c. 1; 15 Cha. 2. c. 14 Pr.
- Territorial extent: England and Wales

Dates
- Royal assent: 3 June 1663
- Commencement: 18 February 1663 (Note: Start of session.)
- Expired: 17 February 1674
- Repealed: 30 July 1948
Other legislation
| Repealed by | Hertfordshire Roads Act 1732; Statute Law Revision Act 1948 |

Status: Repealed

Text of statute as originally enacted

Surrey and Sussex Highways Act 1696
- Act of Parliament
- Parliament of England
- Long title: An Act for repairing the High-way betweene Ryegate in the County of Surrey & Crawley in the County of Sussex.
- Citation: 8 & 9 Will. 3. c. 15
- Territorial extent: England and Wales

Dates
- Royal assent: 1 April 1697
- Commencement: 20 October 1696
- Repealed: 31 January 2013
Other legislation
| Repealed by | Statute Law (Repeals) Act 2013 |
| Relates to | Highways, etc. Act 1691 |

Status: Repealed

Text of statute as originally enacted

Many parishes continued to struggle to find funds to repair major roads and in Hertfordshire, way wardens on behalf of the vestries stood frequent trial at quarter sessions for their failure to keep the Old North Road in a good state of repair. In 1656 the parish of Radwell, Hertfordshire petitioned their local sessions for help to maintain their section of the Great North Road. Probably as a result judges on the Hertfordshire, Cambridgeshire and Huntingdonshire circuit represented the matter to Parliament, it then passed an act of Parliament, the Road Repair (Hertfordshire, Cambridgeshire, and Huntingdonshire) Act 1663 (15 Cha. 2. c. 1), that gave the local justices of the peace powers to erect toll-gates on a section of the road, between Wadesmill, Hertfordshire; Caxton, Cambridgeshire; and Stilton, Huntingdonshire for 11 years, the revenues so raised to be used for the maintenance of the road in their jurisdictions. The toll-gate erected at Wadesmill was the prototype in England. Parliament then gave similar powers to the justices in other counties in England and Wales. An example is the first turnpike act for Surrey, the Surrey and Sussex Highways Act 1696 (8 & 9 Will. 3. c. 15), during the reign of William III for enhanced repairs between Reigate in Surrey and Crawley in Sussex. The act made provision to erect turnpikes, and appoint toll collectors; also to appoint surveyors, who were authorised by order of the justices to borrow money at five per cent interest, on security of the tolls.

== The first turnpike trusts ==
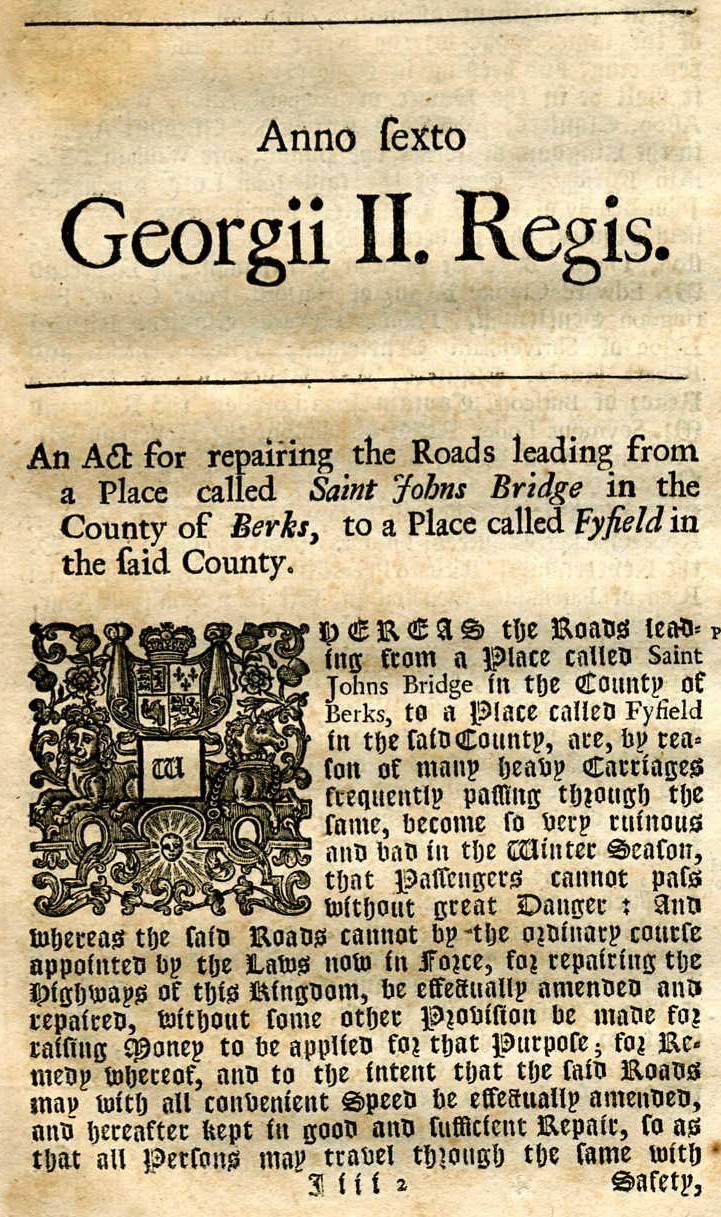
The front page of the act to create the Fyfield Turnpike Trust on the Great Road to Gloucester in 1738

The first scheme that had trustees who were not justices was established through the Bedfordshire and Buckinghamshire Roads Act 1706 (6 Ann. c. 4) for a section of the London-Chester road between Fornhill (near Hockliffe) and Stony Stratford. The basic principle was that the trustees would manage resources from the several parishes through which the highway passed, augment this with tolls from users from outside the parishes and apply the whole to the maintenance of the main highway. This became the pattern for the turnpiking of a growing number of highways, sought by those who wished to improve flow of commerce through their part of a county.

The proposal to turnpike a particular section of road was normally a local initiative and a separate act of Parliament was required to create each trust. Each act gave a set of trustees responsibility for maintaining a specified part of the existing highway. It provided them with powers to achieve this; the right to collect tolls from those using the road was particularly important. Local gentlemen, clergy and merchants were nominated as trustees and they appointed a clerk, a treasurer and a surveyor to actually administer and maintain the highway. These officers were paid by the trust. Trustees were not paid, though they derived indirect benefits from the better transport, which improved access to markets and led to increases in rental income and trade.

The first action of a new trust was to erect turnpike gates at which a fixed toll was charged. The act gave a maximum toll allowable for each class of vehicle or animal – for instance one shilling and six pence for a coach pulled by four horses, a penny for an unladen horse and ten pence for a drove of 20 cows. The trustees could call on a portion of the statute duty from the parishes, either as labour or by a cash payment. The trust applied the income to pay for labour and materials to maintain the road. They were also able to mortgage future tolls to raise loans for new structures and for more substantial improvements to the existing highway.

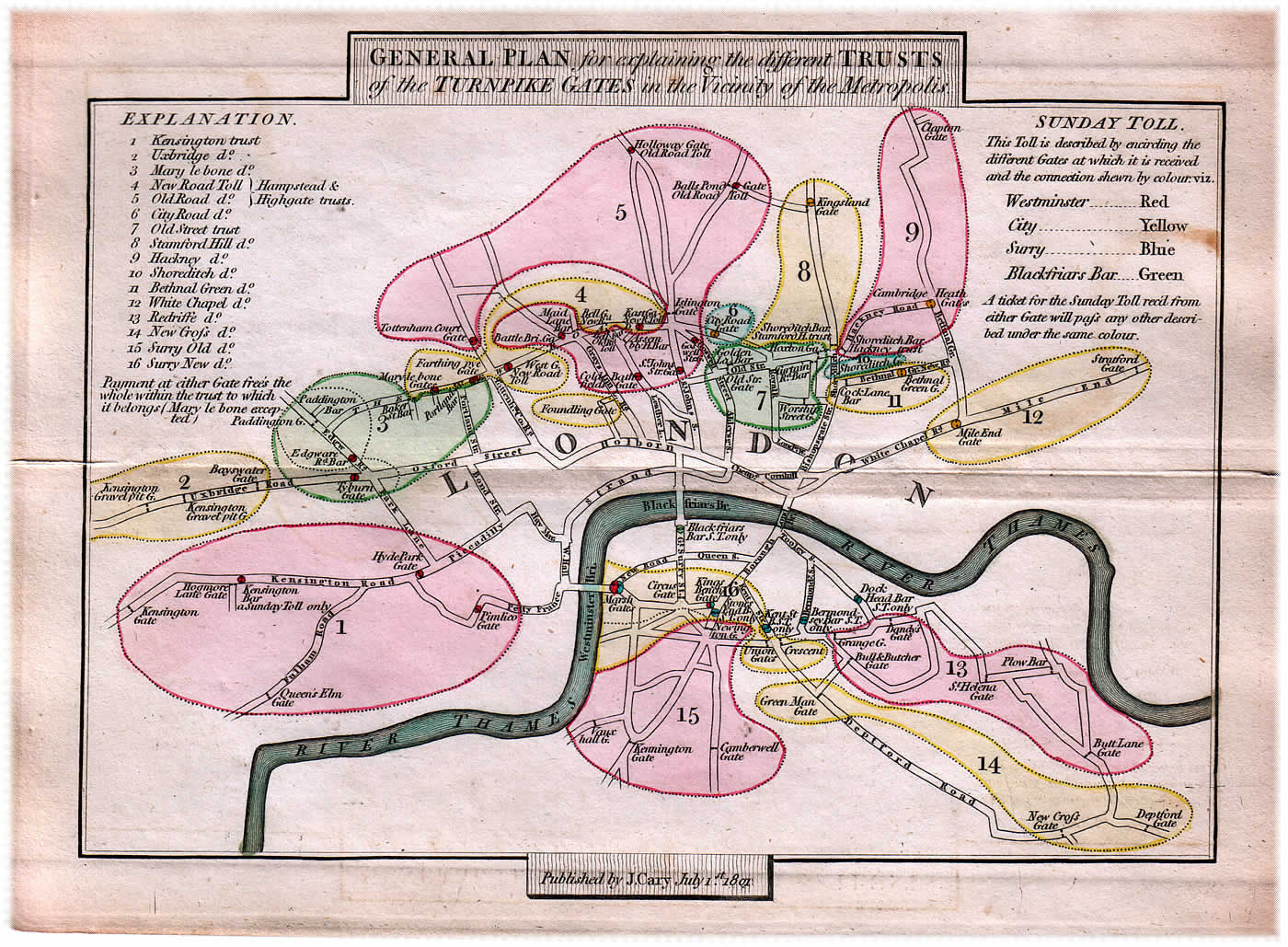
Map of the Turnpike Tollgates in London 1801.

The trusts applied some funds to erecting tollhouses that accommodated the pikeman or toll-collector beside the turnpike gate. Although trusts initially organised the collection of tolls directly, it became common for them to auction a lease to collect tolls. Specialist toll-farmers would make a fixed payment to the trust for the lease and then organise the day-to-day collection of the money, leaving themselves with a profit on their operations over a year.

The powers of a trust were limited, normally to 21 years, after which it was assumed that the responsibility for the now-improved road would be handed back to the parishes. However, trusts routinely sought new powers before this time limit, usually citing the need to pay off the debts incurred in repairing damage caused by a rising volume of traffic, or in building new sections of road.

== The growth of the turnpike system ==
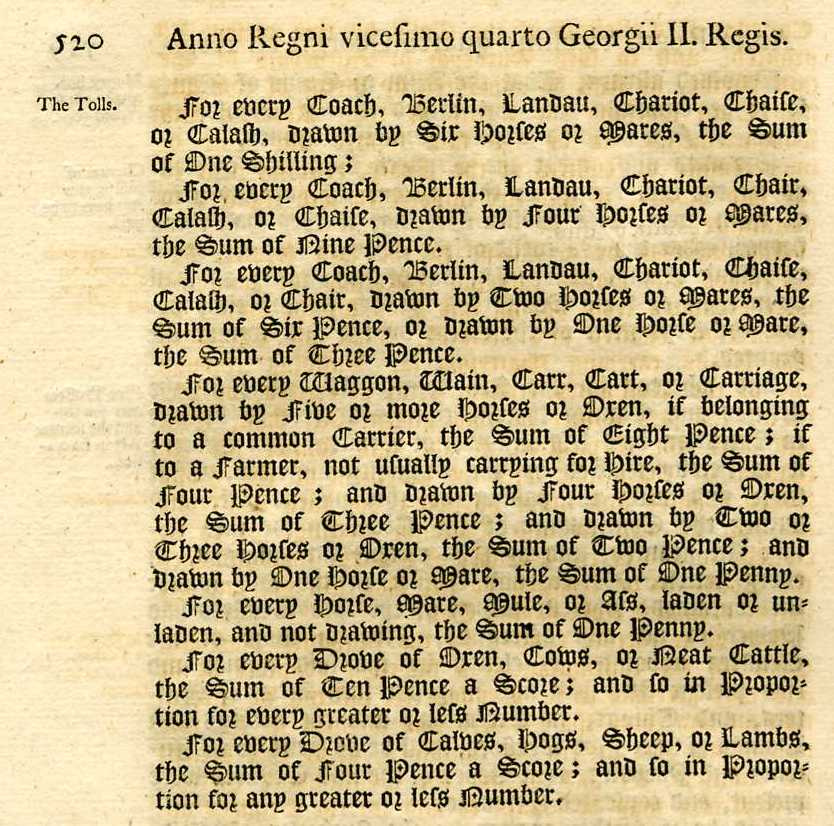
The schedule of maximum tolls allowed on the Woodstock to Rollright Turnpike Trust on the Great Road to Worcester in 1751

During the first three decades of the 18th century, sections of the main radial roads into London were put under the control of individual turnpike trusts. The pace at which new turnpikes were created picked up in the 1750s as trusts were formed to maintain the cross-routes between the Great Roads radiating from London. Roads leading into some provincial towns, particularly in Western England, were put under single trusts and key roads in Wales were turnpiked. In South Wales, the roads of complete counties were put under single turnpike trusts in the 1760s. A further surge of trust formation occurred in the 1770s, with the turnpiking of subsidiary connecting roads, routes over new bridges, new routes in the growing industrial areas and roads in Scotland. About 150 trusts were established by 1750; by 1772 a further 400 were established and, in 1800, there were over 700 trusts. In 1825 about 1,000 trusts controlled 18,000 miles (29,000 km) of road in England and Wales.

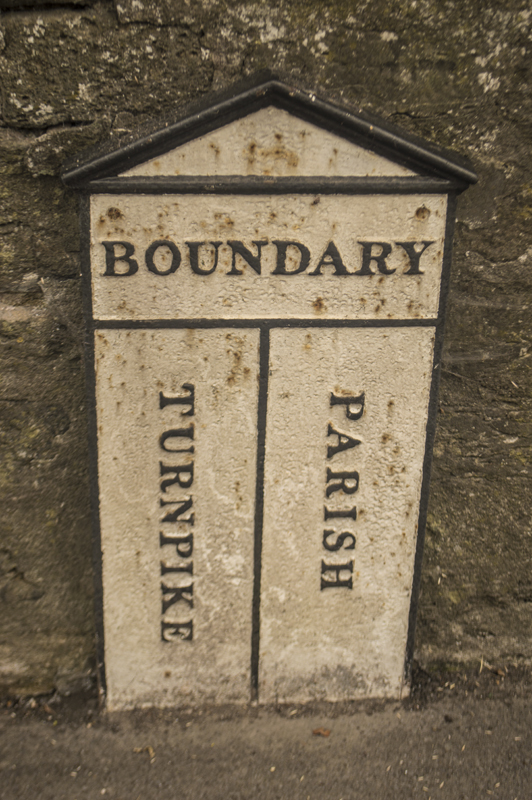
Roadside sign marking boundary between parish and turnpike trust responsibility, Christchurch Road East, Frome, Somerset

The acts of Parliament for these new trusts and the renewal acts for the earlier trusts incorporated a growing list of powers and responsibilities. The Kent Roads Act 1743 (17 Geo. 2. c. 4), the Turnpike Roads Act 1766 (7 Geo. 3. c. 40) and the Turnpike Roads Act 1773 (13 Geo. 3. c. 84) made statutory provision for the erection of milestones along the turnpike roads indicating the distance between the main towns on the road. Users of the road were obliged to follow what were to become rules of the road, such as driving on the left and not damaging the road surface. Trusts could take additional tolls during the summer to pay for watering the road in order to lay the dust thrown up by fast-moving vehicles. Parliament also passed a few general turnpike acts dealing with the administration of the trusts and restrictions on the width of wheels – narrow wheels were said to cause a disproportionate amount of damage to the road.

The rate at which new trusts were created slowed in the early 19th century but the existing trusts were making major investments in highway improvement. The government had been directly involved in the building of military roads in Scotland following a rebellion in 1745, but the first national initiative was a scheme to aid communications with Ireland. Between 1815 and 1826 Thomas Telford undertook a major reorganisation of the existing trusts along the London to Holyhead Road, and the construction of large sections of new road to avoid hindrances, particularly in North Wales.

By 1838 the turnpike trusts in England were collecting £1.5 million per year from leasing the collection of tolls but had a cumulative debt of £7 million, mainly as mortgages. Even at its greatest extent, the turnpike system only administered a fifth of the roads in Britain; the majority being maintained by the parishes. A trust would typically be responsible for about 20 miles (32 km) of highway, although exceptions such as the Exeter Turnpike Trust controlled 147 miles (237 km) of roads radiating from the city. On the Bath Road for instance, a traveller from London to the head of the Thames Valley in Wiltshire would pass through the jurisdiction of seven trusts, paying a toll at the gates of each. Although a few trusts built new bridges (e.g. at Shillingford over the Thames), most bridges remained a county responsibility. A few bridges were built with private funds and tolls taken at these (e.g., the present Swinford Toll Bridge over the Thames).

== Operation of turnpike trusts ==
=== Quality ===
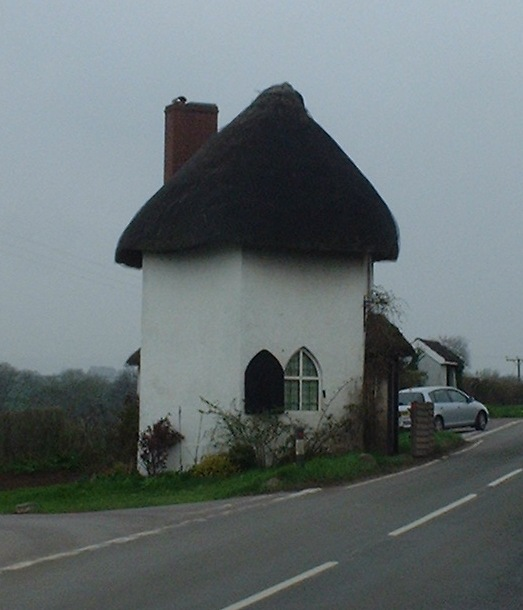
The Round House (Old Toll House) at Stanton Drew

The quality of early turnpike roads was varied. Although turnpiking did result in some improvement to each highway, the technologies used to deal with geological features, drainage, and the effects of weather, were all in their infancy. Road construction improved slowly, initially through the efforts of individual surveyors such as John Metcalf in Yorkshire in the 1760s. 19th-century engineers made great advances, notably Thomas Telford and John Loudon McAdam.

The engineering work of Telford on the Holyhead Road (now the A5) in the 1820s reduced the journey time of the London mail coach from 45 hours to just 27 hours, and the best mail coach speeds rose from 5-6 mph (8–10 km/h) to 9-10 mph (14–16 km/h). McAdam and his sons were employed as general surveyors (consultant engineers) to many of the main turnpike trusts in southern England. They recommended the building of new sections of road to avoid obstructions, eased steep slopes and directed the relaying of existing road-beds with carefully graded stones to create a dry, fast-running surface (known as Macadamising). Coach design improved to take advantage of these better roads and in 1843 the London-to-Exeter mail coach could complete the 170-mile (270-km) journey in 17 hours.

=== Social impact ===
The introduction of toll gates had been resented by local communities which had freely used the routes for centuries. Early Acts had given magistrates powers to punish anyone damaging turnpike property, such as defacing milestones, breaking turnpike gates or avoiding tolls. Opposition was particularly intense in mountainous regions where good routes were scarce. In Mid Wales in 1839, new tolls on old roads sparked protests known as the Rebecca Riots. There were sporadic outbursts of vandalism and violent confrontation by gangs of 50 to 100 or more local men, and gatekeepers were told that if they resisted they would be killed. In 1844, the ringleaders were caught and transported to Australia as convicts. However, the result was that toll gates were dismantled and the trusts abolished in the six counties of South Wales, their powers being transferred to a roads board for each county.

== Turnpike trusts ==
These are incomplete lists of trusts by county.

=== England ===
- Turnpike trusts in North East England (County Durham, Northumberland)
- Turnpike trusts in North West England (Cheshire, Cumberland, Lancashire, Westmorland)
- Turnpike trusts in Yorkshire
- Turnpike trusts in the East Midlands (Derbyshire, Leicestershire, Lincolnshire, Northamptonshire, Nottinghamshire, Rutland)
- Turnpike trusts in the West Midlands (Herefordshire, Shropshire, Staffordshire, Warwickshire, Worcestershire)
- Turnpike trusts in the East of England (Bedfordshire, Cambridgeshire, Essex, Hertfordshire, Huntingdonshire, Norfolk, Suffolk)
- Turnpike trusts in South East England (Berkshire, Buckinghamshire, Hampshire, Kent, Middlesex, Oxfordshire, Surrey, Sussex)
- Turnpike trusts in South West England (Cornwall, Devon, Dorset, Gloucestershire, Somerset, Wiltshire)

=== Wales ===
==== Anglesey ====
- Bangor Ferry to Holyhead
- Beaumaris and Menai Bridge
- Porthaethwy Ferry to Holyhead

==== Breconshire ====
- Breconshire Consolidated

==== Carmarthenshire ====
- Brechfa
- Carmarthen and Newcastle Emlyn
- Carmathen to Lampeterpontstephan
- Garnant Bridge to Rhydyfro Bridge
- Kidwelly District
- Llandeilo and Llandbybie
- LLandovery and Lampeter
- Llandovery and Lllangadog
- Main
- Three Commotts

==== Caernarfonshire ====
- Conway to Pwllheli
- Conway Suspension Bridge
- Menai Suspension Bridge
- Penmanchno
- Porthfinllaen and Nanthwynwant
- Portmadog and Beaverpool
- Yspytty

==== Cardiganshire ====
- Aberystwyth District
- Cardigan District

==== Denbighshire ====
- Cerrig-y-Druidon to Ruthin Branch of Wrexham to Der
- Conway to Llandudno
- Denbigh to Pentre Voelas
- Greenfield, Mostyn, Henllan
- Llanrwst
- Llanrwst and Abergele
- Mold and Denbigh
- Ruabon and Wynstay Branch of Overton District
- Shrewsbury and Bengor Ferry
- St Asaph and Conway Districts
- Wrexham to Barnhill
- Wrexham to Denbigh through Ruthin

==== Flintshire ====
- Chester and Northrop
- Chester and Wrexham
- Chester, Frodsham Wilderspool
- Denbigh and Rhyddlan
- Flint District
- Holywell District
- King's Ferry and Branches (Northop and Eastham)
- King's Ferry to Mold
- Marchwiaill, Bangor Whitchurch
- Mold and Broughton and Branch
- Mostyn District
- Overton District of Shrewsbury Road
- Pont Blyddyn and Llandegla
- Ruthin District (and Mold)
- Saltney to Flint
- Wrexham District

==== Glamorganshire ====
- Abernant, Merthyr, Rhyd-y-Blew
- Bridgend
- Britton Ferry and New Mill Districts
- Caerphilly
- Cardiff District
- Cowbridge
- Ely Branch
- Lanvabon to Abernant
- Llanharry
- Llantrisant District
- Merthy Tydfil District
- Neath
- Swansea
- Twrch
- Wich Tree Bridge
- Wich Tree Bridge (Swansea)

==== Merionethshire ====
- Bala District
- Barmouth and Harlech District
- Dolgellau, Mawddach and Towyn District
- Edeirnion (Corwen and Edeirnion) District
- Festiniog, Maentwrog and Harlech
- Towyn and Celynin District

==== Monmouthshire ====
- Abercarn Turnpike Trust
- Abergavenny Turnpike Trust
- Abergavenny to Llanvihangel Crucorney Turnpike Trust
- Bigsweir Turnpike Trust
- Caerleon Turnpike Trust
- Chepstow Turnpike Trust
- Monmouth Turnpike Trust
- New Passage Turnpike Trust
- Newport Turnpike Trust
- Pontypool Turnpike Trust
- Usk Turnpike Trust

==== Pembrokeshire ====
- Fishguard
- Haverford and St Davids
- Hakin Toll Bridge
- Merlin's Bridge to Pembroke Ferry
- Milford
- Tavernspite
- Whitland District

==== Radnorshire ====
- Radnorshire Consolidated
- Rhayader to Llangerrig

=== Scotland ===
- Stirling to Drymen Turnpike
- Redrow to Peathill Turnpike
- Crossmuirhead to Higginsneuk Turnpike
- West Stirlingshire Turnpike
- Cupar-Angus to Blairgowrie road, turnpiked in 1832
- Perth to Dundee Turnpike
- Dundee to Miegle Turnpike
- Dundee to Forfar Turnpike (Albert Street)

=== Ireland ===
- Dublin to Dunleer Turnpike
- Dublin to Kilcullen Bridge Road Act 1729 (3 Geo. 2. c. 18 (I)) An act for repairing the road leading from the city of Dublin to Kilcullen-bridge, in the county of Kildare.
- Dublin to Navan Road Act 1729 (3 Geo. 2. c. 19 (I)) An Act for repairing the road leading from the City of Dublin, to the Town of Navan, in the County of Meath.
- Dublin to Dunleer Road Act 1731 (5 Geo. 2. c. 15 (I)) An act for repairing the road leading from the city of Dublin to the town of Dunleer in the county of Lowth.
- Dublin to Kinnegad Road Act 1731 (5 Geo. 2. c. 16 (I)) An Act for repairing the Road leading from the City of Dublin, to the Town of Kinnegad in the County of West-Meath.
- Black Bull to Athboy Road Act 1731 (5 Geo. 2. c. 17 (I)) An act for repairing the road leading from the Black-Bull in the county of Meath, to the town of Athboy in the said county.
- Kilcullen to County Kilkenny Road Act 1731 (5 Geo. 2. c. 18 (I)) An Act for repairing the Road leading from the town of Kilcullen in the County of Kildare to the County of Kilkenny.
- Kilkenny to Clonmell Road Act 1731 (5 Geo. 2. c. 19 (I)) An Act for repairing the road leading from the city of Kilkenny to the town of Clonmell in the county of Tipperary.
- Cork to Kilworth Mountain Road Act 1731 (5 Geo. 2. c. 20 (I)) An Act for repairing the Road leading from the city of Cork to the Brook which bounds the Counties of Cork and Tipperary near the Foot of Kilworth Mountain.
- Naas to Maryborough Road Act 1731 (5 Geo. 2. c. 21 (I)) An Act for repairing the road leading from the town of Naas in the county of Kildare to the town of Maryborough in the Queen's county.
- Newcastle, Limerick, and Cork Road Act 1731 (5 Geo. 2. c. 22 (I)) An Act for repairing the Road leading from the town of New-Castle in the County of Limerick to the City of Limerick, and from thence to the City of Cork.

== The end of the system ==
Turnpike Acts Continuance Act 1840
- Act of Parliament
- Parliament of the United Kingdom
- Long title: An Act to continue for One Year from the passing of this Act, and thenceforth until the End of the then next Session of Parliament, the several Acts for regulating the Turnpike Roads in Ireland.
- Citation: 3 & 4 Vict. c. 45
- Territorial extent: United Kingdom

Dates
- Royal assent: 4 August 1840
- Commencement: 4 August 1840 (Note: The Acts of Parliament (Commencement) Act 1793.)
- Repealed: 7 August 1874
Other legislation
| Repealed by | Statute Law Revision Act 1874 (No. 2) |

Status: Repealed

Text of statute as originally enacted

Turnpike Acts Continuance Act 1845
- Act of Parliament
- Parliament of the United Kingdom
- Long title: An Act to continue to the First Day of October One thousand eight hundred and forty-six, and to the End of the then next Session of Parliament, certain Turnpike Acts.
- Citation: 8 & 9 Vict. c. 53
- Territorial extent: United Kingdom

Dates
- Royal assent: 31 July 1845
- Commencement: 31 July 1845
- Repealed: 11 August 1875
Other legislation
| Repealed by | Statute Law Revision Act 1875 |

Status: Repealed

Text of statute as originally enacted

Annual Turnpike Acts Continuance Act 1851
- Act of Parliament
- Parliament of the United Kingdom
- Long title: An Act to continue certain Turnpike Acts in Great Britain.
- Citation: 14 & 15 Vict. c. 37
- Territorial extent: United Kingdom

Dates
- Royal assent: 24 July 1851
- Commencement: 24 July 1851
- Repealed: 11 August 1875
Other legislation
| Repealed by | Statute Law Revision Act 1875 |

Status: Repealed

Text of statute as originally enacted

Annual Turnpike Acts Continuance Act 1870 (Note: Section 14.)
- Act of Parliament
- Parliament of the United Kingdom
- Long title: An Act to continue certain Turnpike Acts in Great Britain, to repeal certain other Turnpike Acts, and to make further Provisions concerning Turnpike Roads.
- Citation: 33 & 34 Vict. c. 73
- Territorial extent: United Kingdom

Dates
- Royal assent: 9 August 1870
- Commencement: various (Note: See act.)
- Repealed: 31 July 1963
Other legislation
| Amended by | Statute Law Revision Act 1883; Statute Law Revision Act 1950 |
| Repealed by | Highways Act 1959; London Government Act 1963 |

Status: Repealed

Text of statute as originally enacted

Annual Turnpike Acts Continuance Act 1871 (Note: Section 21.)
- Act of Parliament
- Parliament of the United Kingdom
- Long title: An Act to continue certain Turnpike Acts in Great Britain, to repeal certain other Turnpike Acts, and to make further provisions concerning Turnpike Roads.
- Citation: 34 & 35 Vict. c. 115
- Territorial extent: United Kingdom

Dates
- Royal assent: 21 August 1871
- Commencement: various (Note: See act.)
- Repealed: 21 May 1981
Other legislation
| Repeals/revokes | Wilts Highways Act 1707 |
| Repealed by | Statute Law (Repeals) Act 1981 |

Status: Repealed

Text of statute as originally enacted

Annual Turnpike Acts Continuance Act 1872 (Note: Section 16.)
- Act of Parliament
- Parliament of the United Kingdom
- Long title: An Act to continue certain Turnpike Acts in Great Britain, to repeal certain other Turnpike Acts, and to make further provisions concerning Turnpike Roads.
- Citation: 35 & 36 Vict. c. 85
- Territorial extent: United Kingdom

Dates
- Royal assent: 10 August 1872
- Commencement: various (Note: See act.)
- Repealed: Northern Ireland: 1 January 1982 (Note: The Roads (1980 Order) (Commencement) Order (Northern Ireland) 1981 (SI 1981/397 (N.I. 11)).)
Other legislation
| Amended by | Statute Law Revision Act 1882; Statute Law Revision Act 1883; Statute Law Revision Act 1898; Highways Act 1959; Statute Law (Repeals) Act 1981 |
| Repealed by | Northern Ireland: Roads (Northern Ireland) Order 1980 |

Status: Partially repealed

Text of statute as originally enacted

Revised text of statute as amended

Text of the Turnpike trust as in force today (including any amendments) within the United Kingdom, from legislation.gov.uk.

Annual Turnpike Acts Continuance Act 1873 (Note: Section 17.)
- Act of Parliament
- Parliament of the United Kingdom
- Long title: An Act to continue certain Turnpike Acts in Great Britain, to repeal certain other Turnpike Acts, and for other purposes connected therewith.
- Citation: 36 & 37 Vict. c. 90
- Territorial extent: United Kingdom

Dates
- Royal assent: 5 August 1873
- Commencement: 5 August 1873
- Repealed: 25 July 1898
Other legislation
| Repealed by | Statute Law Revision Act 1898 |

Status: Repealed

Text of statute as originally enacted

Annual Turnpike Acts Continuance Act 1874 (Note: Section 12.)
- Act of Parliament
- Parliament of the United Kingdom
- Long title: An Act to continue certain Turnpike Acts in Great Britain, and to repeal certain other Turnpike Acts; and for other purposes connected therewith.
- Citation: 37 & 38 Vict. c. 95
- Territorial extent: United Kingdom

Dates
- Royal assent: 7 August 1874
- Commencement: various (Note: See act.)
- Repealed: 25 July 1898
Other legislation
| Repealed by | Statute Law Revision Act 1898 |

Status: Repealed

Text of statute as originally enacted

Annual Turnpike Acts Continuance Act 1875
- Act of Parliament
- Parliament of the United Kingdom
- Long title: An Act to continue certain Turnpike Acts in Great Britain, and to repeal certain other Turnpike Acts; and for other purposes connected therewith.
- Citation: 38 & 39 Vict. c. cxciv
- Territorial extent: United Kingdom

Dates
- Royal assent: 11 August 1875
- Commencement: various (Note: See act.)
- Repealed: 21 May 1981
Other legislation
| Repealed by | Statute Law (Repeals) Act 1981 |

Status: Repealed

Text of statute as originally enacted

Annual Turnpike Acts Continuance Act 1876 (Note: Section 11.)
- Act of Parliament
- Parliament of the United Kingdom
- Long title: An Act to continue certain Turnpike Acts in Great Britain, and to repeal certain other Turnpike Acts; and for other purposes connected therewith.
- Citation: 39 & 40 Vict. c. 39
- Territorial extent: United Kingdom

Dates
- Royal assent: 11 August 1876
- Commencement: various (Note: See act.)
- Repealed: 25 July 1898
Other legislation
| Repealed by | Statute Law Revision Act 1898 |

Status: Repealed

Text of statute as originally enacted

Annual Turnpike Acts Continuance Act 1877 (Note: Section 10.)
- Act of Parliament
- Parliament of the United Kingdom
- Long title: An Act to continue certain Turnpike Acts in Great Britain, and to repeal certain other Turnpike Acts; and for other purposes connected therewith.
- Citation: 40 & 41 Vict. c. 64
- Territorial extent: United Kingdom

Dates
- Royal assent: 14 August 1877
- Commencement: various (Note: See act.)
- Repealed: 25 July 1898
Other legislation
| Repealed by | Statute Law Revision Act 1898 |

Status: Repealed

Text of statute as originally enacted

Annual Turnpike Acts Continuance Act 1878
- Act of Parliament
- Parliament of the United Kingdom
- Long title: An Act to continue certain Turnpike Acts, and to repeal certain other Turnpike Acts; and for other purposes connected therewith.
- Citation: 41 & 42 Vict. c. 62
- Territorial extent: England and Wales (Note: Section 11.)

Dates
- Royal assent: 16 August 1878
- Commencement: various (Note: See act.)
- Repealed: 25 July 1898
Other legislation
| Repealed by | Statute Law Revision Act 1898 |

Status: Repealed

Text of statute as originally enacted

Annual Turnpike Acts Continuance Act 1879 (Note: Section 8.)
- Act of Parliament
- Parliament of the United Kingdom
- Long title: An Act to continue certain Turnpike Acts, and to repeal certain other Turnpike Acts; and for other purposes connected therewith.
- Citation: 42 & 43 Vict. c. 46
- Territorial extent: England and Wales (Note: Section 7.)

Dates
- Royal assent: 11 August 1879
- Commencement: various (Note: See act.)
- Repealed: 25 August 1894
Other legislation
| Repealed by | Statute Law Revision Act 1894 |

Status: Repealed

Text of statute as originally enacted

Annual Turnpike Acts Continuance Act 1880 (Note: Section 9.)
- Act of Parliament
- Parliament of the United Kingdom
- Long title: An Act to continue certain Turnpike Acts, and to repeal certain other Turnpike Acts; and for other purposes connected therewith.
- Citation: 43 & 44 Vict. c. 12
- Territorial extent: England and Wales

Dates
- Royal assent: 2 August 1880
- Commencement: various (Note: See act.)
- Repealed: 25 August 1894
Other legislation
| Repealed by | Statute Law Revision Act 1894 |

Status: Repealed

Text of statute as originally enacted

Annual Turnpike Acts Continuance Act 1881
- Act of Parliament
- Parliament of the United Kingdom
- Long title: An Act to continue certain Turnpike Acts, and to repeal certain other Turnpike Acts; and for other purposes connected therewith.
- Citation: 44 & 45 Vict. c. 31
- Territorial extent: England and Wales

Dates
- Royal assent: 11 August 1881
- Commencement: various (Note: See act.)
- Repealed: 25 August 1894
Other legislation
| Repealed by | Statute Law Revision Act 1894 |

Status: Repealed

Text of statute as originally enacted

Annual Turnpike Acts Continuance Act 1882
- Act of Parliament
- Parliament of the United Kingdom
- Long title: An Act to continue certain Turnpike Acts, and to repeal certain other Turnpike Acts; and for other purposes connected therewith.
- Citation: 45 & 46 Vict. c. 52
- Territorial extent: England and Wales

Dates
- Royal assent: 18 August 1882
- Commencement: various (Note: See act.)
- Repealed: 21 May 1981
Other legislation
| Amended by | Highways Act 1959 |
| Repealed by | Statute Law (Repeals) Act 1981 |

Status: Repealed

Text of statute as originally enacted

Annual Turnpike Acts Continuance Act 1883
- Act of Parliament
- Parliament of the United Kingdom
- Long title: An Act to continue certain Turnpike Acts, and to repeal certain other Turnpike Acts; and for other purposes connected therewith.
- Citation: 46 & 47 Vict. c. 21
- Territorial extent: England and Wales

Dates
- Royal assent: 2 August 1883
- Commencement: various (Note: See act.)
- Repealed: 25 July 1898
Other legislation
| Repealed by | Statute Law Revision Act 1898 |

Status: Repealed

Text of statute as originally enacted

Annual Turnpike Acts Continuance Act 1884
- Act of Parliament
- Parliament of the United Kingdom
- Long title: An Act to continue certain Turnpike Acts, and to repeal certain other Turnpike Acts; and for other purposes connected therewith.
- Citation: 47 & 48 Vict. c. 52
- Territorial extent: England and Wales

Dates
- Royal assent: 7 August 1884
- Commencement: various (Note: See act.)
- Repealed: 21 May 1981
Other legislation
| Repealed by | Statute Law (Repeals) Act 1981 |

Status: Repealed

Text of statute as originally enacted

Annual Turnpike Acts Continuance Act 1885
- Act of Parliament
- Parliament of the United Kingdom
- Long title: An Act to continue certain Turnpike Acts, and to repeal certain other Turnpike Acts; and for other purposes connected therewith.
- Citation: 48 & 49 Vict. c. 37
- Territorial extent: England and Wales

Dates
- Royal assent: 31 July 1885
- Commencement: various (Note: See act.)
- Repealed: 25 July 1898
Other legislation
| Repealed by | Statute Law Revision Act 1898 |

Status: Repealed

Text of statute as originally enacted

By the early Victorian period toll gates were perceived as an impediment to free trade. The multitude of small trusts were frequently charged with being inefficient in use of resources and potentially suffered from petty corruption.

The railway era spelt disaster for most turnpike trusts. Although some trusts in districts not served by railways managed to increase revenue, most did not. In 1829, the year before the Liverpool and Manchester Railway opened, the Warrington and Lower Irlam Trust had receipts of £1,680 but, by 1834, this had fallen to £332. The Bolton and Blackburn Trust had an income of £3,998 in 1846, but in 1847 following the completion of a railway between the two towns, this had fallen to £3,077 and, in 1849, £1,185.

The debts of many trusts became significant; forced mergers of solvent and debt-laden trusts became frequent, and by the 1870s it was feasible for Parliament to close the trusts progressively without leaving an unacceptable financial burden on local communities. From 1871, all applications for renewal were sent to the Turnpike Trust Commission. This arranged for existing acts to continue, but with the objective of discharging the debt, and returning the roads to local administration, which was by then by highway boards. The Local Government Act 1888 gave responsibility for maintaining main roads to county councils and county borough councils. When a trust was ended, there were often great celebrations as the gates were thrown open. The assets of the trust, such as tollhouses, gates and sections of surplus land beside the road were auctioned off to reduce the debt, and mortgagees were paid at whatever rate in the pound the funds would allow.

The legacy of the turnpike trust is the network of roads that still form the framework of the main road system in Britain. In addition, many roadside features such as milestones and tollhouses have survived, despite no longer having any function in the modern road management system.

== Gallery ==
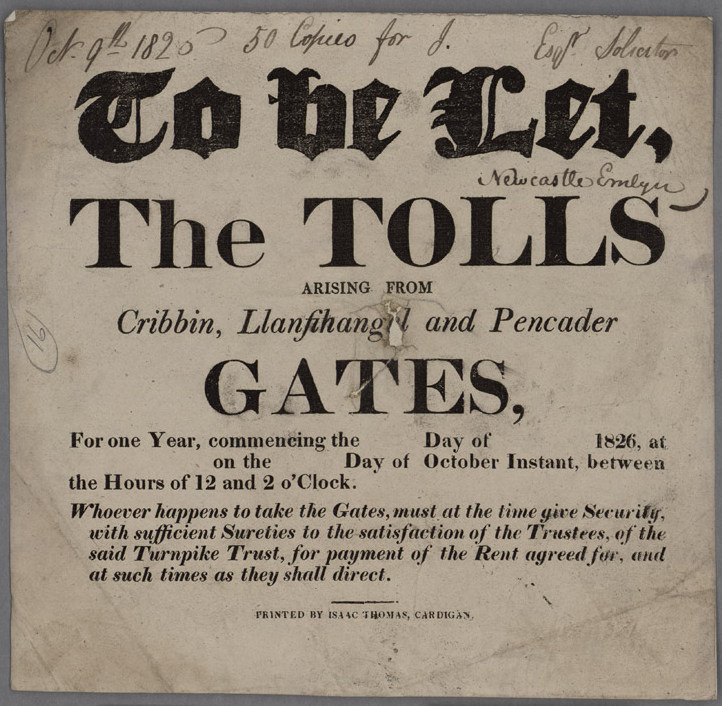
Poster advertising the letting of tolls, 1826.

The surviving Copper Castle Tollhouse on the Honiton Turnpike.

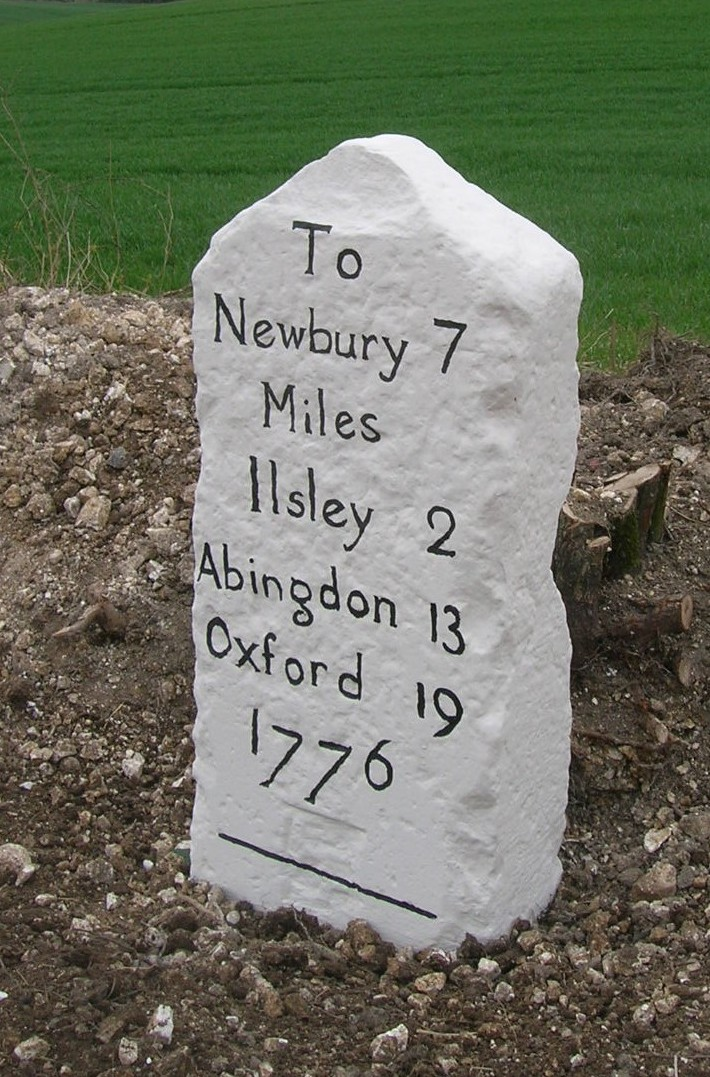
A surviving milestone at Beedon on the Chilton Pond to Newtown River Turnpike.

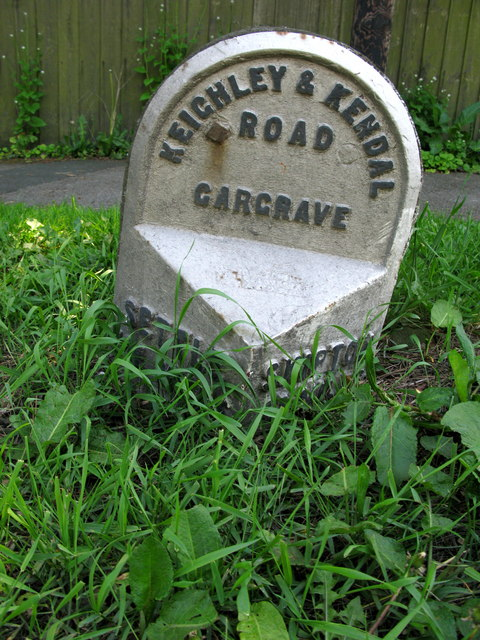
Milepost on the Keighley and Kendal Turnpike at Gargrave: Settle 10 3/4, Kendal 40, Skipton 4 ¾ and Keighley 14 miles.

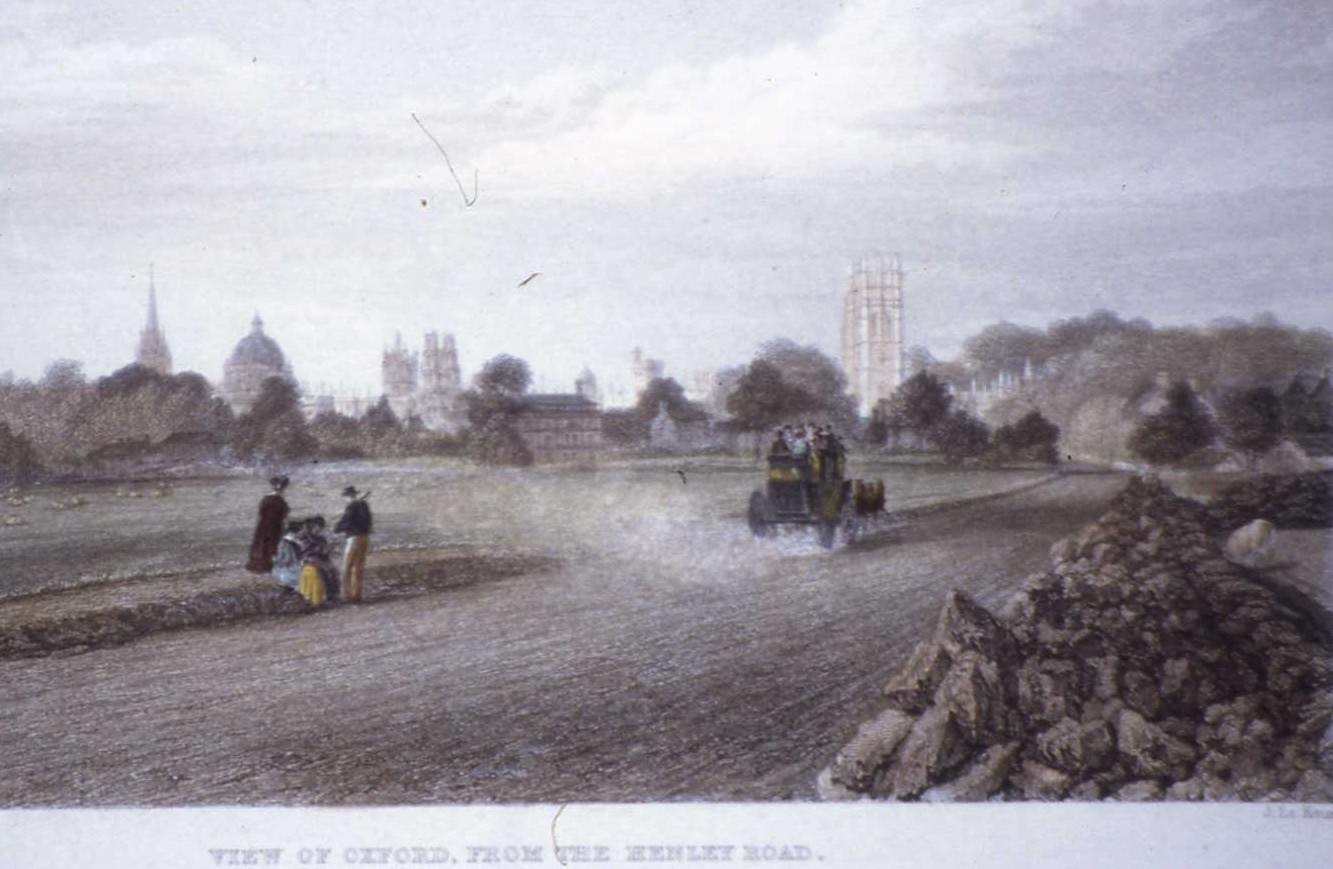
A stagecoach approaching Oxford along the Henley Turnpike Road. The dust is thrown up from the Macadamised surface. Early 1800s.

== See also ==
- Toll roads in Great Britain – for a wider perspective on preceding and succeeding arrangements
- Sparrows Herne Turnpike Road – the London–Aylesbury turnpike road.
- Sheffield to Hathersage Turnpike
- Hatfield and Reading Turnpike – an 18th-century orbital route that linked other turnpikes around London.
- Turnpike trusts in Greater Manchester – describes the trusts which operated within Greater Manchester, from the 0.5 miles (800 m) long Little Lever Trust to the 22 miles (35 km) Manchester to Saltersbrook Trust.
- Keighley and Kendal Turnpike – the turnpike through Craven, Yorkshire.
- Richmond to Lancaster Turnpike – the turnpike across the Pennines to the port of Lancaster./

== Bibliography ==
- Bateman, J.; Welsby, W. N. (1854). The General Turnpike Road Acts. London: Hedges & Smith.
- Bogart, Dan (2017). Shaw-Taylor, L.; Bogart, D.; Satchell, M. (eds.). "The Turnpike Roads of England and Wales" (PDF). The Online Historical Atlas of Transport, Urbanization and Economic Development in England and Wales c. 1680-1911. Cambridge University.
- Harvey, Edward (2010). "Pavage grants and urban street paving in medieval England, 1249-1462". The Journal of Transport History. 31 (2). London: Sage: 151–163. doi:10.7227/TJTH.31.2.3. ISSN 0022-5266. S2CID 167347539.
- Friar, Stephen (2001). The Sutton Companion to Local History. Sutton Publishing. ISBN 0-7509-2723-2.
- Pawson, E. (1977). Transport and Economy: the turnpike roads of eighteenth century England.
- Riden, Philip (1987). Record Sources for Local History. B. T. Batsford Ltd. ISBN 0-7134-4726-5.
- Secretary of State (1852). Turnpike Trusts: County Reports of the Secretary of State: Number 2. Surrey. Accounts and Papers: Turnpike Roads: Volume XLIV. London: HM Stationery Office.
- Searle, M. (1930). Turnpikes and Toll Bars (Limited ed.). Hutchinson & Co.
- Tupling, G. H. (1952). "The Turnpike Trusts of Lancashire". Memoirs and Proceedings of the Manchester Literary and Philosophical Society, Session 1952-1953. 94.
- Webb, Sidney; Webb, Beatrice (1922). English local Government: Statutory Authorities for Special Purpose. London: Longmans, Green and Co.
