= Turnpike trusts in North East England =

Historic road maintenance bodies in England

This is a list of turnpike trusts that maintained roads in the north east of England.

Between 1663 and 1836, the Parliament of Great Britain and the Parliament of the United Kingdom passed a series of acts of Parliament that created organisations – turnpike trusts – that collected road tolls, and used the money to repair the road. These applied to major roads, around a fifth of the road network. The turnpike system was phased out in the 1870s, and major roads transitioned in the 1880s to the maintenance of the new county councils.

The counties used for these lists are the historic counties of England that existed at the time of the turnpike trusts. This article lists those in the north east of England: County Durham and Northumberland.

== County Durham ==
Trust	Founded	Initial act	
Trust	Founded	Citation	Title
Berwick and North Durham Turnpike Trust; Berwick and Norham and Islandshires Turnpike Trust	1753	26 Geo. 2. c. 82	Berwick Roads Act 1753; An Act for repairing the Road from the Turnpike Road at Buckton Burn in the County of Durham, through Berwick upon Tweed, to Lammerton Hill; and also the several other Roads therein mentioned, lying in the said County, and within the Liberties of the said Town of Berwick.
Bishopswearmouth and Norton Turnpike Trust	1789	29 Geo. 3. c. 81	Bishop Wearmouth and Norton Road Act 1789; An Act for altering, raising, widening, repairing, and preserving the Road leading from the Town of Bishop Wearmouth, near Sunderland, in the County of Durham, to the Town of Norton, near Stockton, in the said County.
Boroughbridge and Durham Turnpike Trust	1744	18 Geo. 2. c. 8	Boroughbridge and Darlington Road Act 1744; An Act for repairing the High Road leading from Boroughbridge, in the County of York, through North-Allerton, in the same County, to Croft Bridge, on the River Tees, and from thence through Darlington, in the County of Durham, to the City of Durham.
Bowes and Sunderland Bridge Turnpike Trust	1747	21 Geo. 2. c. 5	Durham Roads Act 1747; An Act for repairing the High Road from the Town of Bowes, in the County of York, to Barnard Castle, in the County of Durham, and from thence, through Staindrop, to Newgate, in Bishop Aukland, and from Newgate, along Gibb Chair, to Gaundless Bridge, and from thence, by Melderston Gill, otherwise Coundon Gill, to the Turnpike Road near Sunderland Bridge, in the County of Durham.
Catterick Bridge to Durham Turnpike Trust	1746	20 Geo. 2. c. 28	Yorkshire and Durham Roads Act 1746; An Act for repairing the Road leading from Catherick Bridge, in the County of York, to Yarm, in the said County, and from thence to Stockton, in the County of Durham, and from thence, through Sedgefield, in the said County of Durham, to the City of Durham.
Cockerton Bridge and Staindrop Turnpike Trust; Darlington and Cockerton Bridge Turnpike Trust	1793	33 Geo. 3. c. 146	Cockerton Bridge to Staindrop Road Act 1793; An Act for repairing the High Road leading from Cockerton Bridge, near Darlington, in the County of Durham, to Staindrop, in the said County.
Cows Hill to Calton Turnpike Trust; Allendale Turnpike Trust	1826	7 Geo. 4. c. lxxiv	Branch End, Allendale and Cows Hill Turnpike Road Act 1826; An Act for making and maintaining a Turnpike Road, leading out of the Alstone Turnpike Road at Branch End in the County of Northumberland, through Cotton, Allendale Town and Allenheads, to Cows Hill in the County of Durham, with several Branches therefrom.
Darlington and West Auckland Turnpike Trust	1750	24 Geo. 2. c. 30	Durham Roads Act 1750; An Act for repairing the High Roads leading from Darlington, in the County of Durham, to West Auckland, and several other Roads in the said County, therein mentioned.
Darlington to Middleton Tyas Turnpike Trust; Angel Inn and Barton Lane End Turnpike Trust	1831	1 & 2 Will. 4. c. xiii	Darlington and Barton Lane End Turnpike Road Act 1831; An Act for making a Turnpike Road (with a Branch therefrom) from the Angel Inn, near Darlington in the County of Durham, to Barton Lane End in the County of York.
Derwent and Shotley Bridge Turnpike Trust; Winlaton to Shotley Bridge Turnpike Trust	1833	3 & 4 Will. 4. c. lxxix	Road from Axwell Park Gate to Shotley Bridge (Durham) Act 1833; An Act for making a Turnpike Road (with a Branch therefrom) from the Angel Inn, near Darlington in the County of Durham, to Barton Lane End in the County of York.
Durham and Shotley Bridge Turnpike Trust	1810	50 Geo. 3. c. iii	Road between Durham and Shotley Bridge Act 1810; An Act for altering, improving and keeping in Repair the Road between the City of Durham and the Village of Shotley Bridge, in the County of Durham.
Durham and Sunderland Turnpike Trust; Sunderland and Durham Turnpike Trust	1746	20 Geo. 2. c. 13	Sunderland to Durham Road Act 1746; An Act for repairing the Road from Sunderland, near the Sea, to the City of Durham, in the County of Durham.
Durham and Tyne Bridge Turnpike Trust	1746	20 Geo. 2. c. 12	Durham to Tyne Bridge Road Act 1746; An Act for repairing the High Road leading from the City of Durham in the County of Durham, to Tyne Bridge, in the said County.
Edmondbyers Turnpike Trust; Stanhope to Shotley Turnpike Trust	1815	55 Geo. 3. c. x	Road from Stanhope to Shotley Act 1815; An Act for repairing the Road from the Town of Stanhope, by Edmondbyers, in the County of Durham, to the Corbridge Turnpike Road near Greenhead, in the Parish of Shotley, in the County of Northumberland.
Eggleston Coal Road Turnpike Trust	1792	32 Geo. 3. c. 127	Durham Roads Act 1792; An Act for amending, widening, and keeping in Repair the Road leading from the Hoodgate, at the West End of the Town of Middleton, in Teesdale, in the County of Durham, to the Gate in the new Enclosure called The Edge, near the Collieries called West Pitts, in the Parish of Saint Andrew's Auckland, in the same County, and also a Branch from the said Road, at or near the Head of the Town of Egleston to Egleston Bridge, over the River Tees.
Gateshead and Hexham Turnpike Trust	1777	17 Geo. 3. c. 110	Durham Roads Act 1777; An Act for repairing and widening the Road from Gateshead, in the County of Durham, to the Church Lane near Ryton Lane-head; and from the Bar Moor to the Hexham Turnpike Road, near Dilston Bar, in the County of Northumberland; and also the Road from Mickley Bank to Lead-hill or Silverhill; and for making a Road cross certain Grounds belonging to Crozier Surtees Esquire, in the Parish of Ryton, in the County, of Durham.
Lobley Hill and Branches Turnpike Trust	1793	33 Geo. 3. c. 148	Durham Roads Act 1793; An Act for repairing, widening, and altering the Road from the Turnpike Road between Gateshead and Hexham, near Lobley Hill, in the Parish of Whickham, in the County of Durham, to Burtry Ford, in the Parish of Stanhope, in the same County, and a Branch from the said Road, near Bryan's Leap, in the County of Durham, to the Corbridge Turnpike Road near Blackhedley, in the County of Northumberland; and another Branch from the said Road at Wolsingham, in the County of Durham, to Crosgate, near the City of Durham.
Middleton to Staindrop Turnpike Trust; Brough and Middleton Turnpike Trust	1817	57 Geo. 3. c. xlv	Road to Middleton Bridge Act 1817; An Act for making and keeping in Repair a Carriage Road from or near the Town of Brough under Stainmore, in the County of Westmorland, to Middleton Bridge, in the Parish of Romaldkirk, in the North Riding of the County of York, with a Branch from or near Chapel House to Eggleston Bridge, in the same Parish.
Ovingham to Bywell Turnpike Trust	1777	17 Geo. 3. c. 110	Durham Roads Act 1777; An Act for repairing and widening the Road from Gateshead, in the County of Durham, to the Church Lane near Ryton Lane-head; and from the Bar Moor to the Hexham Turnpike Road, near Dilston Bar, in the County of Northumberland; and also the Road from Mickley Bank to Lead-hill or Silverhill; and for making a Road cross certain Grounds belonging to Crozier Surtees Esquire, in the Parish of Ryton, in the County, of Durham.
Piercebridge to Kirkmellington Turnpike Trust	1747	21 Geo. 2. c. 27	Durham Roads (No. 2) Act 1747; An Act for repairing the High Road from Peirs Bridge, to Kirkmerrington, in the County of Durham, and from thence to the Turnpike Road at Tudhoe Lane End, in the said County.
South Shields Turnpike Trust	1826	7 Geo. 4. c. xvii	South Shields and Vigo Lane Turnpike Road Act 1826; An Act for making and maintaining a Turnpike Road from South Shields to White Mere Pool, and from thence to join the Durham and Newcastle Turnpike Road at Vigo Lane, with a Branch from Jarrow Slake to East Boldon, all in the County of Durham.
Stockton and Barnard Castle Turnpike Trust	1746	20 Geo. 2. c. 25	Stockton to Barnard Castle Road Act 1746; An Act for repairing the High Road leading from the Town of Stockton upon Tees to Darlington, and from thence, through Winston, to Barnard Castle, in the same County.
Wearmouth Bridge and Tyne Bridge and Branches Turnpike Trust	1796	36 Geo. 3. c. 136	Wearmouth and Tyne Bridge Road Act 1796; An act for making and maintaining a convenient carriage road from Wearmouth Bridge to Tyne Bridge, with a branch from the said road to the town of South Shields, all in the county of Durham.
West Auckland Turnpike Trust	1792	32 Geo. 3. c. 113	Durham and Northumberland Roads Act 1792; An Act for altering, raising, widening, repairing and preserving the Road leading from the North End of the Turnpike Road called The Coal Road, near West Auckland, in the County of Durham, to the Elsdon Turnpike Road at or near Elishaw, in the County of Northumberland; and for erecting, building, and making necessary and convenient Bridges, Mounts, and Batteries upon the same.

== Northumberland ==
Trust	Founded	Initial act	
Trust	Founded	Citation	Title
Allendale Turnpike Trust	1826	7 Geo. 4. c. lxxiv	Branch End, Allendale and Cows Hill Turnpike Road Act 1826; An Act for making and maintaining a Turnpike Road, leading out of the Alstone Turnpike Road at Branch End in the County of Northumberland, through Cotton, Allendale Town and Allenheads, to Cows Hill in the County of Durham, with several Branches therefrom.
Alnmouth and Hexham Turnpike Trust	1751	25 Geo. 2. c. 46	Northumberland Roads (No. 2) Act 1751; An Act for repairing and widening the Road from Alemouth through the Town of Alnwick, to Rothbury, and from thence to the Town of Hexham, and also the Road leading out of the aforesaid Road, between Alnwick and Rothbury, to Jockey's Dike Bridge, in the County of Northumberland.
Alnwick to Eddlingham Turnpike Trust	1826	7 Geo. 4. c. lxxv	Alnwick, Eglingham and Chatton Road Act 1826; An Act for more effectually amending, widening, altering, improving and maintaining the Road from the Town of Alnwick in the County of Northumberland, by Eglingham and Chatton, to the Great North Turnpike Road near to Haggerston Toll Bar in the County of Durham.
Bartry Ford to Burnstones Turnpike Trust	1794	34 Geo. 3. c. 125	Burtry Ford to Burnstone Road Act 1794; An act for altering, repairing, and widening the road, from Burtry Ford, in the county of Durham, to Alston, in the county of Cumberland, and from Alston aforesaid, by the dyke, to Burnstones, in the county of Northumberland.
Belford to Ford Bridge Turnpike Trust			
Cow-causey and Buckton-Burn Turnpike Trust	1746	20 Geo. 2. c. 9	Northumberland Roads Act 1746; An Act for repairing the High Road leading from the North End of The Cow Cawsey, near the Town of Newcastle upon Tyne, to the Town of Belford, and from thence to Buckton Burn, in the County of Northumberland.
Deanburn Bridge, Berwick, Cornhill Turnpike Trust	1759	33 Geo. 2. c. 56	Durham Roads Act 1759; An Act for repairing and widening the Roads from Deanburn Bridge, through Greenlaw and Part of the Jedburgh Road, by Lauder in the Shire of Berwick, to Cornhill in the County of Durham; and for building a Bridge over The Tweed, near Coldstream.
Elsdon and Rudwater Turnpike Trust; Elsdon and Reedwater Turnpike Trust	1776	16 Geo. 3. c. 83	Northumberland Roads Act 1776; An Act for repairing, widening, and altering the Road, from the Termination of the present Turnpike Road, at Elsdon Highcross, near the Town of Elsdon, in the County of Northumberland, on the North-east Side of the River Reed, through Overacres, Elishaw, and Catcleugh, to the Red Swyre, upon the Mid Border betwixt England and Scotland.
Ford, Lowick and Redscar Turnpike Trust; Ford and Lowick Turnpike Trust	1792	32 Geo. 3. c. 145	Northumberland and Durham Roads Act 1792; An Act for repairing and improving the Road leading from Cornhill Burn, by Pallinsburn and Flodden Lane, to Milfield March Burn, and by Ford Bridge to Lowick; and also several other Roads therein mentioned, all in the Counties of Northumberland and Durham.
Hexham Turnpike Trust; Glenwilt to Shildon Common Turnpike Trust	1751	25 Geo. 2. c. 48	Northumberland Roads (No. 3) Act 1751; An Act for repairing and widening the Road leading from a Part of the Road directed to be repaired by an Act passed in the last Session of Parliament, from Carlisle to Newcastle upon Tyne, near Glenwelt, to another Part of the Road so making from Carlisle to Newcastle, upon Shildon Common, in the County of Northumberland.
Hexham to Alston Turnpike Trust	1778	18 Geo. 3. c. 116	Hexham to Alston Road Act 1778; An Act for altering, repairing and widening, the Road from Summer Rods Bar, near the Town of Hexham, in the County of Northumberland, to the Town of Alston, in the County of Cumberland.
Kelso to Cornhill Turnpike Trust	1793	33 Geo. 3. c. 185	Berwick and Durham Roads Act 1793; An Act for repairing and widening that Part of the Road leading from Kelso towards the Town of Selkirk, which lies to the Eastward of the Turnpike Road leading from Jedburgh to Lauder, which crosses the River Tiviot, near the Town of Kelso, and the Road leading from Kelso towards Coldstream, to the Place where it joins the Turnpike Road leading from Greenlaw to Coldstream, and from Kelso through Ednam, to Orange Lane, in the Parish of Eccles, in the County of Berwick, and from the Ford at Newton Mill, through Ednam to Edenfoot, and from Kelso to Cornhill, in the County of Durham.
Newcastle upon Tyne to Carlisle Turnpike Trust	1750	24 Geo. 2. c. 25	Carlisle and Newcastle Road Act 1750; An Act for laying out, making, and keeping in Repair, a Road proper for the Passage of Troops and Carriages, from the City of Carlisle, to the Town of Newcastle upon Tyne.
Newcastle upon Tyne to River Wanspeck Turnpike Trust			
North Shields and Newcastle upon Tyne Turnpike Trust	1749	22 Geo. 2. c. 9	Northumberland Roads (No. 2) Act 1748; An Act for repairing the Road from North Shields, in the County of Northumberland, to the Town of Newcastle upon Tyne.
Percy's Cross to Millfield Turnpike Trust	1807	47 Geo. 3 Sess. 2. c. xiii	Roads from Percy's Cross and from Wooler (Northumberland) Act 1807; An Act for making and maintaining Roads from Percy's Cross to Milfield Burn, and from Wooler to Bowsdon Burn, in the County of Northumberland.
Ponteland Turnpike Trust	1748	22 Geo. 2. c. 7	Northumberland Roads Act 1748; An Act for repairing the Road from The West Cowgate, near the Town of Newcastle upon Tyne, through the West End of Kenton, Pont Eland, Higham Dykes, Newham Edge, Belsay Mill, and South Middleton, to the North Side of the River Wanspeck, in the County of Northumberland.
Shields and Morpeth Turnpike Trust	1814	54 Geo. 3. c. xxix	Turnpike Road between North Shields and Morpeth Castle Act 1814; An Act for making and maintaining a Road from the Turnpike Road between North Shields and Newcastle upon Tyne, to Morpeth Castle, and for making and maintaining Three several Branches of Road to communicate therewith; all lying in the Counties of Northumberland and Durham.
Wooler and Adderstone Turnpike Trust	1825	6 Geo. 4. c. xxviii	Wooler and Adderstone Lane Road (Northumberland) Act 1825; An Act for more effectually amending, widening, improving and keeping in Repair the Road from Wooler to the Great North Turnpike Road, at or near to Adderstone Lane, in the County of Northumberland.
Wooler and Beamish Turnpike Trust	1751	25 Geo. 2. c. 18	Northumberland Roads Act 1751; An Act for repairing the Road leading from Long Horsley Bar, or Gate, on the Post Road near the Town of Morpeth, by or through Long Horsley, Weldon Bridge, and Whittingham, to the River Breamish, and from thence to Piercy's Cross, in the County of Northumberland.
