= Sheffield to Hathersage Turnpike =

Early road in England

The Sheffield to Hathersage turnpike was an early road through the English Peak District, which was improved by a turnpike trust in the 18th century. The road may have originated as a Roman road.

== Background ==
During the 18th century, Sheffield's expanding industry sought new customers and markets for their products. This provided for products to be transported to many locations which required samples and purchases. Existing communication with large towns in the south like Birmingham and London were adequate, but markets to the west were largely inaccessible. The moors, bogs, and steep escarpments called 'edges' of the high moorland plateau in the Dark Peak of the Peak District, made communications more difficult in the High Peak, Derbyshire.

In 1758 the road from Little Sheffield over the moors to Hathersage, which ran through Castleton to Sparrow Pit Gate on the Chapel-en-le-Frith Road was turnpiked by the Yorks and Derby Roads Act 1757 (31 Geo. 2. c. 62).

A distribution system was concurrently provided by carriers who were financed by enterprising captains of industry.

== Chaps ==
Chaps were packhorse drivers who assembled at an inn adjoined the Cutlers' Hall, Church Street, Sheffield.

The traders who acted as distributing agents were called "chaps" or "chapmen". They were mostly Scotch or Irish, with some English. Their chief resort was "The Bird-in-Hand", Church Lane. The house adjoined the Cutlers' Hall, standing indeed on part of its present site. When a "chap" arrived, the ostler went round to inform the manufacturers of the fact, and received a penny from each one for his trouble.... "The Sheffield Directory of I787 gives a list of more than a score carriers' carts regularly plying to all parts of the country on stated days. Some of these started from their owners' warehouses; others from the "Tontine", "The Angel"; "The Grey Horse" and "The Bay Horse", High Street; the "Travellers", Westbar; the "Royal Oak", King Street; the "Black Swan", Snighill; "The Mitre", Fargate; the "Chandlers' Arms" and the "Yellow Lion", Bull Stake; the "Bird-in-Hand", Brinsworth Orchard; and the "King's Head", Change Alley. They took a fearful time to make their journeys. A collection of old letters from customers in the country is full of wails over the non-arrival of goods ordered long before, and over the carelessness and indifference of the carriers. The coaches did something to cure this, when urgency required speed, but their tariff, even when reduced to 1½d. per pound, was prohibitive in the case of heavy goods.

== The journey via Ringinglow ==
To get on to the London Road the traveller had to go down Coalpit Lane and Button Lane to Little Sheffield (a group of poor and time-worn cottages). The road ran across the gorse-clad swampy common called Sheffield Moor, forded the Porter Brook over which there was only a foot-bridge; thence up a sharp rise to Highfield, and so down Goose Green to Heeley. There the steep old lane, which some may remember, had to be climbed to Newfield Green. This, at the end of the seventeenth century, '...appeared to be a very ancient way, being worne very deep. Sheffield people, both before and after the civil wars, had got into the habit of avoiding this toilsome route by going through the Park over Sheaf Bridge (at the bottom of Dixon Lane) in at the Park gate (where now is the junction of Broad Street and South Street), and out, by a line represented by the present Cricket Inn Road, at another gate on Gleadless Moor.

Fording Porter Brook at 'Little Sheffield', the team climbed London Road to Heeley, thence up Sharrow Lane to Sharrow Head, pausing for water and refreshment at "The Stag's Head Inn", Psalter Lane. The toll-road continued past Brincliffe Quarry to Banner Cross, Ecclesall Road. (The old toll-house at Banner Cross was demolished in the early 1900s.) When a toll-bar was established at Hunters Bar this new section of toll-road along Ecclesall Road became a less arduous alternative route.

From Banner Cross the toll-road climbed Ringinglow Road to Bents Green where the "Hammer and Pincers" provided refreshment, water, and repairs to the animals' metal shoes. The hamlet of Ringinglow was served by another toll-booth, known colloquially as "The Round House" opposite "The Norfolk Arms".

Here the road turns south west over Houndkirk (a.k.a. Ankirk) Moor to "The Fox House" where huge Millstone Grit stone sets centered 4 ft. 8½ inches apart, prevented cart-wheels from sinking into the soft, peaty, moorland soil. (Reputedly established by Julius Caesar as the standard gauge for Roman chariots this measurement is still in use today and Houndkirk Road is still called "The Roman Road" by local people as is the Long Causeway, Lodge Moor.)

== The journey via Stanage Edge ==
A further turnpike road to Hathersage and on into Derbyshire via Hope and Castleton ran through Lodge Moor over Stanage Edge where passengers had to disembark, assisting coachmen to unharness the team of horses and manhandle coaches over the precipitous gritstone escarpment. Stanage Pole, (grid reference SK2468784429) a wooden stake some 20 ft (6.1 m), high erected at the brow of the hill, provides a way-mark to travellers in bad weather.

Long Causeway, as the turnpike is now called, followed the old Roman road. It is widely believed that this track follows the line of a Roman road running from Templeborough to the fort at Navio (Brough-on-Noe), but archaeologists have cast doubt on this. During the early 19th century a section of the turnpike at Lodge Moor was lost when the three Redmires reservoirs were built by 'Sheffield Waterworks', after obtaining an act of Parliament, the Sheffield Water Act 1830 (11 Geo. 4 & 1 Will. 4. c. lv), authorising their construction and an aqueduct to Hadfield Dam, Crookes was completed in 1830.

== The demise of the turnpikes ==
In 1893 the Totley Tunnel (6,230-yards/3.5 miles/5.7 km long) was completed on the former London Midland and Scottish Railway (LMS) Manchester to Sheffield railway beneath Totley Moor making it the longest mainline railway tunnel in England, and rail-travel superseded the old turnpike routes.

== See also ==
- A625 road
- Keighley and Kendal Road - the turnpike through Craven.
