= Statute Law (Repeals) Act 2013 =

Act of the Parliament of the United Kingdom

Statute Law (Repeals) Act 2013 (Note: Section 3(1).)
- Act of Parliament
- Parliament of the United Kingdom
- Long title: An Act to promote the reform of the statute law by the repeal, in accordance with recommendations of the Law Commission and the Scottish Law Commission, of certain enactments which (except in so far as their effect is preserved) are no longer of practical utility.
- Citation: 2013 c. 2
- Introduced by: Chris Grayling MP (Commons); Lord McNally (Lords)
- Territorial extent: United Kingdom (Note: Section 2.)

Dates
- Royal assent: 31 January 2013
- Commencement: 31 January 2013 (Note: Section 3(2).)
Other legislation
Amends	See § Repealed enactments
Repeals/revokes	See § Repealed enactments
Relates to	See Statute Law (Repeals) Act

Status: Current legislation

History of passage through Parliament

Text of statute as originally enacted

Revised text of statute as amended

The Statute Law (Repeals) Act 2013 (c. 2) is an act of the Parliament of the United Kingdom which repealed the whole of 817 acts of Parliament, and portions of more than 50 others. It is the largest Statute Law (Repeals) Act which has been recommended by the Law Commission.

== Background ==
The act implemented recommendations contained in the nineteenth report on statute law revision, by the Law Commission and the Scottish Law Commission.

== Provisions ==
The act repealed

- 16 Scottish laws relating to imposing a duty on every pint of ale, beer or porter sold or brewed in certain parts of Scotland

In total, the act repealed 817 acts in full. The act partially repealed 50 other acts.

Section 1 of the act repealed and revoked the enactments and instruments listed in schedule 1 to the act, which is arranged in 11 parts.

=== Part 1: Benevolent institutions ===
Part 1 listed acts relating to benevolent societies that no longer existed (plus the Philanthropic Society, whose successor Catch22 is now regulated by charity law).

Schedule 1, Part 1 – Benevolent institutions
Citation	Short title	Extent of repeal
Group 1 – Sutton's Hospital in Charterhouse
8 Geo. 1. c. 29	Charterhouse Governors (Quorum) Act 1721	The whole act.
11 & 12 Geo. 6. c. v	Sutton's Hospital in Charterhouse Charity Scheme Confirmation Act 1948	The whole act.
4 & 5 Eliz. 2. c. lvi	Sutton's Hospital (Charterhouse) Charity Scheme Confirmation Act 1956	The whole act.
Group 2 – Addenbrooke's Hospital
7 Geo. 3. c. 99	Addenbrooke's Hospital, Cambridge Act 1767	The whole act.
3 Edw. 7. c. clv	Addenbrooke's Hospital Scheme Confirmation Act 1903	The whole act.
Group 3 – Magdalen Hospital
9 Geo. 3. c. 31	Magdalen Hospital, London Act 1769	The whole act.
11 & 12 Vict. c. xvii	Magdalen Hospital Amendment Act 1848	The whole act.
29 & 30 Vict. c. cxxx	Magdalen Hospital Amendment Act 1866	The whole act.
1 Edw. 8 & 1 Geo. 6. c. xxiv	Magdalen Hospital Charity Scheme Confirmation Act 1937	The whole act.
Group 4 – Female Orphan Asylum
39 & 40 Geo. 3. c. lx	Female Orphan Asylum Act 1800	The whole act.
5 Geo. 4. c. v	Asylum for Female Orphans Act 1824	The whole act.
33 & 34 Vict. c. xv	Female Orphan Asylum Amendment Act 1870	The whole act.
14 & 15 Geo. 5. c. xxi	Board of Education Scheme (Female Orphan Asylum &c.) Confirmation Act 1924	The whole act.
Group 5 – Durham County Schools
41 Geo. 3. (U.K.) c. cxx	Durham County Schools Act 1801	The whole act.
3 Geo. 4. c. 26 Pr.	Durham County Schools Amendment Act 1822	The whole act.
Group 6 – Philanthropic Society
46 Geo. 3. c. cxliv	Philanthropic Society's Act 1806	The whole act.
4 Geo. 4. c. 18	Philanthropic Society's Act 1823	The whole act.
11 & 12 Vict. c. cix	Philanthropic Society's Act 1848	The whole act.
Group 7 – Bethlem Hospital
50 Geo. 3. c. cxcviii	Bethlem Hospital Act 1810	The whole act.
2 & 3 Vict. c. 20	Bethlem Hospital Act 1839	The whole act.
34 & 35 Vict. c. cxxii	Bethlem Hospital Act 1871	The whole act.
Group 8 – Earl of Leicester's Hospital
53 Geo. 3. c. ccxiii	Earl of Leicester's Hospital, Warwick Act 1813	The whole act.
16 & 17 Geo. 5. c. xxv	Robert Earl of Leicester's Hospital Charity Scheme Confirmation Act 1926	The whole act.
Group 9 – Bristol School for the Blind
2 & 3 Will. 4. c. xxxix	Bristol Asylum or School of Industry for the Blind Act 1832	The whole act.
5 Edw. 7. c. clxxi	Bristol Blind Asylum Act 1905	The whole act.
Group 10 – Middlesex Hospital
6 & 7 Will. 4. c. vii	Middlesex Hospital Act 1836	The whole act.
1 & 2 Geo. 6. c. xii	Middlesex Hospital Act 1938	The whole act.
Group 11 – Newcastle Hospital
10 & 11 Vict. c. 34 {Pr.	Holy Jesus Hospital, Newcastle-upon-Tyne Act 1847	The whole act.
3 & 4 Geo. 6. c. xxxv	Saint Mary Magdalene Hospital (Newcastle-upon-Tyne) Act 1940	The whole act.
Group 12 – London Hospital
47 & 48 Vict. c. xviii	London Hospital Act 1884	The whole act.
62 & 63 Vict. c. l	London Hospital Act 1899	The whole act.
Group 13 – Ireland
48 Geo. 3. c. cxlv	Maynooth Academy Act 1808	The whole act.
50 Geo. 3. c. cviii	Kilkenny City Asylum Act 1810	The whole act.
50 Geo. 3. c. clii	Kildare County Infirmary Act 1810	The whole act.
11 Geo. 4 & 1 Will. 4. c. lxxii	Barrington's Hospital, Limerick Act 1830	The whole act.
2 & 3 Will. 4. c. ciii	Cork General Hospital Act 1832	The whole act.
8 & 9 Vict. c. 25	Maynooth College Act 1845	The whole act.
42 & 43 Vict. c. ccxx	Mungret Agricultural School, &c. Act 1879	The whole act.
48 & 49 Vict. c. xlvii	Barrington's Hospital Amendment Act 1885	The whole act.
55 & 56 Vict. c. ccxvii	Galway Hospital Act 1892	The whole act.
59 & 60 Vict. c. xxii	Waterford Infirmary Act 1896	The whole act.
2 Edw. 7. c. xxxv	Waterford and Bishop Foy Endowed Schools Act 1902	The whole act.
Group 14 – General Repeals
48 Geo. 3. c. lxxvii	Hospital for Poor French Protestants Act 1808	The whole act.
52 Geo. 3. c. clvii	Wigan Free Grammar School Act 1812	The whole act.
3 & 4 Will. 4. c. cxvii	Troopers Fund (or St. George's Fund Society) Act 1833	The whole act.
4 & 5 Will. 4. c. xxxviii	St. George's Hospital, Hyde Park Corner Act 1834	The whole act.
6 & 7 Will. 4. c. xx	Westminster Hospital Act 1836	The whole act.
1 & 2 Vict. c. lxxi	Refuge for the Destitute Act 1838	The whole act.
3 & 4 Vict. c. cxxv	Lord Scudamore's Charity Act 1840	The whole act.
19 & 20 Vict. c. cxxxiii	Imprisoned Debtors Discharge Society's Act 1856	The whole act.
60 & 61 Vict. c. xix	Mason's Orphanage Act 1897	The whole act.
62 & 63 Vict. c. xlix	Infant Orphan Asylum Act 1899	The whole act.
7 Edw. 7. c. xc	Alton Military Hospital Act 1907	The whole act.
9 Edw. 7. c. cxlviii	Whittington Charity Scheme Confirmation Act 1909	The whole act.
2 & 3 Geo. 5. c. clxxiii	Haberdashers' Company Loan Fund Bearing Interest Scheme Confirmation Act 1912	The whole act.
3 & 4 Geo. 5. c. clxxv	Bournemouth Hospitals Scheme Confirmation Act 1913	The whole act.
13 & 14 Geo. 5. c. lvi	Lucas's Hospital Charity Scheme Confirmation Act 1923	The whole act.
15 & 16 Geo. 5. c. xlvi	French Protestant Episcopal Church of the Savoy Act 1925	The whole act.
16 & 17 Geo. 5. c. xxiii	Passmore Edwards (Tilbury) Cottage Hospital Charity Scheme Confirmation Act 1926	The whole act.
17 & 18 Geo. 5. c. xxxii	Feltwell Fuel Allotment Charity Scheme Confirmation Act 1927	The whole act.
18 & 19 Geo. 5. c. xv	Richmond Parish Charity Lands Scheme Confirmation Act 1928	The whole act.
22 & 23 Geo. 5. c. xvii	Goldsmiths' Consolidated Charities Scheme Confirmation Act 1932	The whole act.
22 & 23 Geo. 5. c. xviii	Ford Street Charity Scheme Confirmation Act 1932	The whole act.
23 & 24 Geo. 5. c. xiv	Jesus Hospital (Chipping Barnet) Scheme Charity Confirmation Act 1933	The whole act.
23 & 24 Geo. 5. c. xxxvi	Cancer Hospital (Free) Act 1933	The whole act.
23 & 24 Geo. 5. c. xc	Samaritan Free Hospital for Women Act 1933	The whole act.
24 & 25 Geo. 5. c. lii	Prince of Wales's Hospital Plymouth Act 1934	The whole act.
26 Geo. 5 & 1 Edw. 8. c. lxxvi	Buckingham's Charity (Dunstable) Scheme Confirmation Act 1936	The whole act.
6 & 7 Eliz. 2. c. x	Reading Almshouse and Municipal Charities Scheme Confirmation Act 1958	The whole act.
6 & 7 Eliz. 2. c. xii	St James's Dwellings Charity Scheme Confirmation Act 1958	The whole act.

=== Part 2: Civil and criminal justice ===
Part 2 covered enactments relating to criminal law. The Police Act 1969 was technically still in force despite all of its sections having been repealed since 1994.

Schedule 1, Part 2 – Civil and criminal justice
Citation	Short title	Extent of repeal
Group 1 – Criminal Process
11 Geo. 4 & 1 Will. 4. c. 37	Criminal Law (Scotland) Act 1830	Section 2.
11 Geo. 4 & 1 Will. 4. c. 37	Criminal Law (Scotland) Act 1830	Section 6.
Group 2 – Distress
Statutes of the Exchequer (statutes of uncertain date)	Les Estatuz del Eschekere	Chapter 12 (relating to the Exchequer Court).
Group 3 – Extradition
36 & 37 Vict. c. 60	Extradition Act 1873	The whole act.
Group 4 – Forgery
43 Geo. 3. c. 139	Forgery of Foreign Bills Act 1803	The whole act.
Group 5 – Fraud
1987 c. 41	Criminal Justice (Scotland) Act 1987	Sections 51 to 53.
1988 c. 33	Criminal Justice Act 1988	In Schedule 15, paragraph 111.
Group 6 – Police
1969 c. 63	Police Act 1969	The whole act.
Group 7 – Sale of Public Offices
5 & 6 Edw. 6. c. 16	Sale of Offices Act 1551	The whole act.
49 Geo. 3. c. 126	Sale of Offices Act 1809	The whole act.
SR&O 1922/183	Government of Ireland (Adaptation of Enactments) (No.3) Order 1922	Article 41(a).
14 & 15 Geo. 6. c. 39	Common Informers Act 1951	In the Schedule, the entry relating to section 6 of the Sale of Offices Act 1809.

=== Part 3: Indian railways ===
Part 3 listed acts relating to railways in India, no longer under British sovereignty.

Schedule 1, Part 3 – Indian railways
Citation	Short title	Extent of repeal
Group 1 – Assam Railways and Trading Company
60 & 61 Vict. c. xvii	Assam Railways and Trading Company's Act 1897	The whole act.
10 Edw. 7 & 1 Geo. 5. c. xiv	Assam Railways and Trading Company's Act 1910	The whole act.
Group 2 – Bengal and North Western Railway Company
4 & 5 Geo. 5. c. viii	Bengal and North Western Railway Company Limited Act 1914	The whole act.
Group 3 – Bombay Baroda and Central India Railway Company
6 Edw. 7. c. lix	Bombay Baroda and Central India Railway Act 1906	The whole act.
14 & 15 Geo. 5. c. vii	Bombay Baroda and Central India Railway Act 1924	The whole act.
1 & 2 Geo. 6. c. x	Bombay Baroda and Central India Railway Act 1938	The whole act.
5 & 6 Geo. 6. c. v	Bombay Baroda and Central India Railway Act 1942	The whole act.
Group 4 – Calcutta and South Eastern Railway Company
20 & 21 Vict. c. xxiii	Calcutta and South-eastern Railway Act 1857	The whole act.
Group 5 – Ceylon Railway Company
19 & 20 Vict. c. ci	Ceylon Railway Company's Act 1856	The whole act.
25 & 26 Vict. c. ci	Ceylon Railway Company's Dissolution Act 1862	The whole act.
Group 6 – East Indian Railway Company
12 & 13 Vict. c. xciii	East Indian Railway Act 1849	The whole act.
16 & 17 Vict. c. ccxxvi	East Indian Railway Company Act 1853	The whole act.
18 & 19 Vict. c. xxxviii	East Indian Railway Act 1855	The whole act.
19 & 20 Vict. c. cxxi	East Indian Railway Company Act 1856	The whole act.
27 & 28 Vict. c. clvii	East Indian Railway Company's Act 1864	The whole act.
42 & 43 Vict. c. ccvi	East Indian Railway Company Purchase Act 1879	The whole act.
55 & 56 Vict. c. x	East Indian Railway Company Sinking Fund Act 1892	The whole act.
58 & 59 Vict. c. xx	East Indian Railway Company's Act 1895	The whole act.
Group 7 – Eastern Bengal Railway Company
20 & 21 Vict. c. clix	Eastern Bengal Railway Act 1857	The whole act.
29 & 30 Vict. c. cxxxvi	Eastern Bengal Railway Act 1866	The whole act.
47 & 48 Vict. c. cciv	Eastern Bengal Railway Company Purchase Act 1884	The whole act.
Group 8 – Great Indian Peninsula Railway Company
12 & 13 Vict. c. lxxxiii	Great Indian Peninsula Railway Company Act 1849	The whole act.
17 & 18 Vict. c. xliv	Great Indian Peninsula Railway Company Act 1854	The whole act.
63 & 64 Vict. c. cxxxviii	Great Indian Peninsula Railway Purchase Act 1900	The whole act.
17 & 18 Geo. 5. c. v	Great Indian Peninsula Railway Annuities Act 1927	The whole act.
Group 9 – Madras Railway Company
16 & 17 Vict. c. xlvi	Madras Railway Act 1853	The whole act.
17 & 18 Vict. c. xxix	Madras Railway Company Act 1854	The whole act.
18 & 19 Vict. c. xl	Madras Railway Act 1855	The whole act.
8 Edw. 7. c. iii	Madras Railway Annuities Act 1908	The whole act.
12 & 13 Geo. 5. c. vii	Madras Railway Annuities Act 1922	The whole act.
Group 10 – Oude Railway Company
21 & 22 Vict. c. lxxxiii	Oude Railway Act 1858	The whole act.
Group 11 – Scinde Railway Company
20 & 21 Vict. c. clx	Scinde Railway Act 1857	The whole act.
32 & 33 Vict. c. lxxx	Scinde Railway Company's Amalgamation Act 1869	The whole act.
49 & 50 Vict. c. xlii	Scinde, Punjaub and Delhi Railway Purchase Act 1886	The whole act.
Group 12 – South Indian Railway Company
21 & 22 Vict. c. cxxxviii	Great Southern of India Railway Act 1858	The whole act.
23 & 24 Vict. c. xlix	Great Southern of India Railway Amendment Act 1860	The whole act.
37 & 38 Vict. c. cxii	South Indian Railway Act 1874	The whole act.
51 & 52 Vict. c. v	South Indian Railway (Additional Powers) Act 1888	The whole act.

=== Part 4: Ireland (Dublin City) ===
Part 4 relates to Dublin, no longer under British sovereignty.

Schedule 1, Part 4 – Ireland (Dublin City)
Citation	Short title	Extent of repeal
Group 1 – Dublin Steam Packet Company
3 & 4 Will. 4. c. cxv	City of Dublin Steam Packet Company Act 1833	The whole act.
6 & 7 Will. 4. c. c	Dublin Steam Packet Act 1836	The whole act.
23 & 24 Vict. c. xcviii	City of Dublin Steam Packet Company's Act 1860	The whole act.
24 & 25 Vict. c. iii	City of Dublin Steam Packet Company's (Consolidation of Shares) Act 1861	The whole act.
31 & 32 Vict. c. xxx	City of Dublin Steam Packet Company's Act 1868	The whole act.
39 & 40 Vict. c. xi	City of Dublin Steam Packet Company's Act 1876	The whole act.
47 & 48 Vict. c. cxxx	City of Dublin Steam Packet Company's Act 1884	The whole act.
58 & 59 Vict. c. cxxiii	City of Dublin Steam Packet Company's Act 1895	The whole act.
10 Edw. 7 & 1 Geo. 5. c. vii	City of Dublin Steam Packet Company's Act 1910	The whole act.
6 & 7 Geo. 5. c. viii	City of Dublin Steam Packet Company's Act 1916	The whole act.
10 & 11 Geo. 5. c. i	City of Dublin Steam Packet Company's Act 1920	The whole act.
Group 2 – Dublin Hospitals
50 Geo. 3. c. cxcii	Dublin Foundling Hospital Act 1810	The whole act.
54 Geo. 3. c. 128	Dublin Foundling Hospital Act 1814	The whole act.
55 Geo. 3. c. lxxxi	Meath Hospital and County of Dublin Infirmary Act 1815	The whole act.
59 Geo. 3. c. lxi	Meath Hospital and County of Dublin Infirmary Act 1819	The whole act.
1 Geo. 4. c. 29	Dublin Foundling Hospital Act 1820	The whole act.
1 Geo. 4. c. 49	Dublin House of Industry Act 1820	The whole act.
3 Geo. 4. c. 35	Dublin Foundling Hospital Act 1822	The whole act.
19 & 20 Vict. c. 110	Dublin Hospitals Regulation Act 1856	The whole act.
60 & 61 Vict. c. cvi	Dublin Eye and Ear Hospital Act 1897	The whole act.
Group 3 – Dublin Police and Justice
5 Geo. 4. c. 102	Dublin Justices Act 1824	The whole act.
6 & 7 Will. 4. c. 29	Dublin Police Act 1836	The whole act.
2 & 3 Vict. c. 78	Dublin Police Act 1839	The whole act.
5 & 6 Vict. c. 24	Dublin Police Act 1842	The whole act.
11 & 12 Vict. c. 113	Dublin Police Act 1848	The whole act.
21 & 22 Vict. c. 84	Four Courts (Dublin) Extension Act 1858	The whole act.
22 & 23 Vict. c. 52	Dublin Police Act 1859	The whole act.
30 & 31 Vict. c. 95	Dublin Police Act 1867	The whole act.
Group 4 – Dublin General Post Office and Record Office
48 Geo. 3. c. 48	Dublin General Post Office Act 1808	The whole act.
49 Geo. 3. c. 70	Dublin General Post Office Act 1809	The whole act.
54 Geo. 3. c. 63	Dublin General Post Office Act 1814	The whole act.
54 Geo. 3. c. 113	Dublin Site of Record Office Act 1814	The whole act.
7 Geo. 4. c. 13	Site for Record Office (Ireland) Act 1826	The whole act.
Group 5 – Dublin Carriages
16 & 17 Vict. c. 112	Dublin Carriage Act 1853	The whole act.
17 & 18 Vict. c. 45	Dublin Amended Carriage Act 1854	The whole act.
18 & 19 Vict. c. 65	Dublin Amended Carriage Act 1855	The whole act.
Group 6 – Dublin Corporation
13 & 14 Vict. c. 81	Dublin Corporation Act 1850	The whole act.
52 & 53 Vict. c. cxxix	Dublin Corporation Loans Act 1889	The whole act.
56 & 57 Vict. c. xv	Dublin Corporation Act 1893	The whole act.
63 & 64 Vict. c. cclxiv	Dublin Corporation Act 1900	The whole act.

=== Part 5: Local courts and administration of justice ===
Part 5 relates to courts that no longer exist.

Schedule 1, Part 5 – Local courts and administration of justice
Citation	Short title	Extent of repeal
1 Will. & Mar. c. 17 Pr.	Erecting Newcastle-upon-Tyne Court of Conscience Act 1688	The whole act.
1 Will. & Mar. c. 18 Pr.	Erecting Bristol and Gloucester Courts of Conscience Act 1688	The whole act.
45 Geo. 3. c. lxi	High Peak and Castleton Courts Baron Act 1805	The whole act.
46 Geo. 3. c. iii	West Riding of Yorkshire Court Houses Act 1806	The whole act.
46 Geo. 3. c. xxxi	York Judges' House Act 1806	The whole act.
46 Geo. 3. c. lxxxvii	Southwark and East Brixton Court of Requests Act 1806	The whole act.
46 Geo. 3. c. cxxx	Croydon Court House, Market House and Burial Ground Act 1806	Sections 9 to 12.
46 Geo. 3. c. cxxx	Croydon Court House, Market House and Burial Ground Act 1806	Sections 15 to 18.
47 Geo. 3 Sess. 2. c. xxxii	Cumberland County Court Act 1807	The whole act.
48 Geo. 3. c. cxxxiv	Kingston-upon-Thames and Imworth Inclosure, Court House and Market House Act 1808	Sections 47 to 54.
49 Geo. 3. c. lxxv	Lincolnshire Courthouse Act 1809	The whole act.
49 Geo. 3. c. clxxxv	Northumberland Gaol and Courts of Justice Act 1809	The whole act.
55 Geo. 3. c. ix	Hereford County Offices Act 1815	The whole act.
55 Geo. 3. c. xciii	City of London Courts of Justice Act 1815	The whole act.
1 & 2 Geo. 4. c. xcvi	Salop County Judges' Accommodations Act 1821	The whole act.
1 & 2 Geo. 4. c. cxxiv	Louth County Court House Act 1821	The whole act.
3 Geo. 4. c. lxxiv	Lincolnshire County Offices Act 1822	The whole act.
10 Geo. 4. c. xxxiii	St. Albans Court House Act 1829	The whole act.
1 & 2 Will. 4. c. xxxiii	Lincoln County Offices Act 1831	The whole act.
4 & 5 Will. 4. c. xl	Glamorgan, Brecon and Monmouth Court of Requests Act 1809 Repeal Act 1834	The whole act.
6 & 7 Will. 4. c. xi	Ipswich Assizes Act 1836	The whole act.
6 & 7 Will. 4. c. xii	Bodmin Assizes Act 1836	The whole act.
1 & 2 Vict. c. xci	Ashby de la Zouch Court of Requests Act 1838	The whole act.
2 & 3 Vict. c. xcvii	Hatfield (Yorkshire) Small Debts Recovery Act 1839	The whole act.
2 & 3 Vict. c. xcix	Newark Small Debts Recovery Act 1839	The whole act.
3 & 4 Vict. c. lxix	Kingsnorton and Northfield Small Debts Recovery Act 1840	The whole act.
12, 13 & 14 Geo. 6. c. 101	Justices of the Peace Act 1949	The whole act.
1974 c. 47	Solicitors Act 1974	In Schedule 3, paragraph 4.
1999 c. 22	Access to Justice Act 1999	Section 45.
2007 c. 29	Legal Services Act 2007	In Schedule 21, paragraph 130.

=== Part 6: London ===
Part 6 covers acts relating to London, for churches and improvements, and acts regulating London gas lights, which had been replaced with electric lights.

Schedule 1, Part 6 – London
Citation	Short title	Extent of repeal
Group 1 – Churches
28 Hen. 8. c. 27	Church of Elsing Spytle, Parish Church of St. Alphes Act 1536	The whole act.
8 & 9 Will. 3. c. 14	Rebuilding of St. Paul's and Westminster Abbey Act 1696	The whole act.
9 Ann. c. 17	New Churches in London and Westminster Act 1710	The whole act.
1 Geo. 1. St. 2. c. 23	Building of Churches, London and Westminster Act 1714	The whole act.
4 Geo. 1. c. 5	St. Michael, Cornhill Building Act 1717	The whole act.
4 Geo. 1. c. 14	St. Giles in the Fields Rebuilding Act 1717	The whole act.
5 Geo. 2. c. 4	Church at Woolwich Act 1731	The whole act.
6 Geo. 2. c. 8	Church of St. George, Southwark Act 1732	The whole act.
10 Geo. 2. c. 18	Church of St. Olave, Southwark Act 1736	The whole act.
12 Geo. 2. c. 7	Ealing Church Act 1738	The whole act.
12 Geo. 2. c. 9	Woolwich Church Act 1738	The whole act.
12 Geo. 2. c. 17	St. Catherine Coleman Act 1738	The whole act.
15 Geo. 2. c. 12	St. Catherine Coleman Act 1741	The whole act.
24 Geo. 2. c. 15	Islington Church Act 1750	The whole act.
26 Geo. 2. c. 94	St. Botolph Church Aldersgate Act 1753	The whole act.
1 Geo. 3. c. 38	Croydon Parish Church Act 1760	The whole act.
28 Geo. 3. c. 62	St. Peter le Poor Parish Church Act 1788	The whole act.
32 Geo. 3. c. 39	St. Botolph Church Aldersgate Act 1792	The whole act.
32 Geo. 3. c. 64	St. Bride Church Act 1792	The whole act.
36 Geo. 3. c. 35	St. Bride's Church, City Act 1796	The whole act.
36 Geo. 3. c. 103	St. Martin Outwich Church, City Act 1796	The whole act.
39 Geo. 3. c. lxxxi	St. Mary-le-Bow Lecturer's Trust Act 1799	The whole act.
47 Geo. 3 Sess. 1. c. xxviii	Bridewell Hospital Chapel Act 1807	The whole act.
57 Geo. 3. c. vii	St. Olave Southwark Rectory Act 1817	The whole act.
Group 2 – Improvements
8 & 9 Will. 3. c. 37	Streets (London) Act 1696	The whole act.
12 Geo. 1. c. 37	Kensington, Chelsea and Fulham Roads (Tolls) Act 1725	The whole act.
4 Geo. 2. c. 34	Fulham Roads Act 1730	The whole act.
16 Geo. 2. c. 6	Charterhouse Square Rates Act 1742	The whole act.
23 Geo. 2. c. 10	Fulham Roads Act 1749	The whole act.
23 Geo. 2. c. 18	Southwark Streets Act 1749	The whole act.
24 Geo. 2. c. 58	Southwark Roads Act 1750	The whole act.
27 Geo. 2. c. 25	St. Luke's, Middlesex (Lighting and Watching) Act 1754	The whole act.
29 Geo. 2. c. 43	Bethnal Green Road Act 1756	The whole act.
31 Geo. 2. c. 36	Passage from Charing Cross Act 1757	The whole act.
4 Geo. 3. c. 54	South London Roads Act 1764	The whole act.
7 Geo. 3. c. 105	Bethnal Green Road Act 1767	The whole act.
8 Geo. 3. c. 33	Shoreditch Streets Act 1768	The whole act.
12 Geo. 3. c. 38	Christchurch, Middlesex Act 1772	The whole act.
16 Geo. 3. c. 60	Shoreditch Streets Act 1776	The whole act.
17 Geo. 3. c. 23	London Streets Act 1776	The whole act.
18 Geo. 3. c. 49	Ratcliff Highway Act 1778	The whole act.
18 Geo. 3. c. 50	Goodman's Fields Act 1778	The whole act.
18 Geo. 3. c. 51	Southwark Streets Act 1778	The whole act.
18 Geo. 3. c. 73	London Streets Act 1778	The whole act.
18 Geo. 3. c. 77	Shoreditch Streets Act 1778	The whole act.
18 Geo. 3. c. 78	Spitalfields Streets Act 1778	The whole act.
22 Geo. 3. c. 43	Spitalfields Improvement Act 1782	The whole act.
25 Geo. 3. c. 96	Shoreditch Streets Act 1785	The whole act.
28 Geo. 3. c. 60	Christchurch, Middlesex Improvement Act 1788	The whole act.
30 Geo. 3. c. 76	Hans Town, Chelsea Improvement Act 1790	The whole act.
39 Geo. 3. c. lxxiv	Charles Street, Westminster Act 1799	The whole act.
39 & 40 Geo. 3. c. xlii	Temple Bar Improvement Act 1800	The whole act.
43 Geo. 3. c. xi	Hans Town (Chelsea) Improvement Act 1803	The whole act.
44 Geo. 3. c. xxvii	Temple Bar Improvement Act 1804	The whole act.
44 Geo. 3. c. lxxxvi	Southwark Improvement Act 1804	The whole act.
45 Geo. 3. c. vi	Bethnal Green Road Act 1805	The whole act.
46 Geo. 3. c. xcvii	City of London Lottery Act 1806	The whole act.
49 Geo. 3. c. lxx	London and Westminster Houses Lottery Act 1809	The whole act.
51 Geo. 3. c. cciii	Temple Bar Improvement Act 1811	The whole act.
8 & 9 Vict. c. xiii	Southwark Improvement Act 1845	The whole act.
16 & 17 Vict. c. ccxv	Westminster Improvement Association Act 1853	The whole act.
20 & 21 Vict. c. 67	Pimlico Improvement Act 1857	The whole act.
Group 3 – London Gaslight Acts
15 & 16 Vict. c. lxxxii	London Gaslight Act 1852	The whole act.
20 & 21 Vict. c. lxxiii	London Gaslight Act 1857	The whole act.
29 & 30 Vict. c. lv	London Gaslight Act 1866	The whole act.
43 & 44 Vict. c. xcvi	London Gaslight Act 1880	The whole act.
Group 4 – Markets
4 & 5 Will. 4. c. xlv	South London Market Act 1834	The whole act.
7 Will. 4 & 1 Vict. c. cxiv	South London Market Company Act 1837	The whole act.
17 & 18 Vict. c. lxiii	Islington Market Repeal Act 1854	The whole act.
27 & 28 Vict. c. cxli	South London Market Act 1864	The whole act.
29 & 30 Vict. c. cclxix	South London Market Act 1866	The whole act.
31 & 32 Vict. c. clxviii	Lambeth Market Act 1868	The whole act.
45 & 46 Vict. c. cxliv	South London (Elephant and Castle) Market Act 1882	The whole act.
45 & 46 Vict. c. cxlvi	London River-side Fish Market Act 1882	The whole act.
46 & 47 Vict. c. clviii	Paddington Market Act 1883	The whole act.
48 & 49 Vict. c. xlix	London River-side Fish Market Act 1885	The whole act.
1 Edw. 7. c. lxxi	London Riverside Fish Market (Transfer to Corporation of London) Act 1901	The whole act.
Group 5 – General Repeals
5 & 6 Will. & Mar. c. 10	Orphans, London Act 1694	The whole act.
21 Geo. 2. c. 29	Orphans, London Act 1747	The whole act.
12 Geo. 3. c. 65	St. George's Fields, Surrey: Right of Common Extinguished Act 1772	The whole act.
16 Geo. 3. c. 31	Theatre Royal, Covent Garden Act 1776	The whole act.
42 Geo. 3. c. lxxxviii	London Fish Trade Act 1802	The whole act.
46 Geo. 3. c. cxxxii	Port of London Act 1806	The whole act.
54 Geo. 3. c. clxxix	Westminster Society for Insurance of Lives and Survivorship and for Granting Annuities Act 1814	The whole act.
57 Geo. 3. c. lx	City of London Gauger Act 1817	The whole act.
3 Geo. 4. c. cxiii	Orphans' Fund, City of London Act 1822	The whole act.
19 & 20 Vict. c. cvii	London Printing and Publishing Company's (Limited) Act 1856	The whole act.
23 & 24 Vict. c. lxxxv	London Hydraulic Power Company Limited Act 1860	The whole act.
26 & 27 Vict. c. ccvi	City of London Traffic Regulation Act 1863	The whole act.
53 & 54 Vict. c. ix	South London Polytechnic Institutes (Borough Road Site) Act 1890	The whole act.
7 Edw. 7. c. lxx	King Edward's Hospital Fund for London Act 1907	The whole act.
12, 13 & 14 Geo. 6. c. 16	National Theatre Act 1949	Section 1.
1974 c. 55	National Theatre Act 1974	The whole act.

=== Part 7: Lotteries ===
Part 7 covered lotteries from past centuries.

Schedule 1, Part 7 – Lotteries
Citation	Short title	Extent of repeal
10 Ann. c. 27 Pr.	Million Lottery Tickets Act 1711	The whole act.
38 Geo. 3. c. iii	Macklin's Lottery Act 1798	The whole act.
39 & 40 Geo. 3. c. cii	Pigot and Fisher Diamond Lottery Act 1800	The whole act.
44 Geo. 3. c. vi	Boydell's Lottery Act 1804	The whole act.
45 Geo. 3. c. xxiv	Bowyer's Lottery Act 1805	The whole act.
47 Geo. 3 Sess. 1. c. i	Bowyer's Lottery Act 1807	The whole act.
1971 c. 57	Pool Competitions Act 1971	The whole act.

=== Part 8: Poor relief ===
Part 8 contained acts relating to long-since reformed aspects of poor law.

Schedule 1, Part 8 – Poor relief
Citation	Short title	Extent of repeal
Group 1 – General Repeals
9 Will. 3. c. 17 Pr.	Crediton Workhouse Act 1697	The whole act.
9 Will. 3. c. 18 Pr.	Tiverton Workhouse Act 1697	The whole act.
9 Will. 3. c. 33 Pr.	Exeter Workhouse Act 1697	The whole act.
9 Will. 3. c. 34 Pr.	Hereford Workhouse Act 1697	The whole act.
9 Will. 3. c. 37 Pr.	Colchester Workhouse Act 1697	The whole act.
9 Will. 3. c. 48 Pr.	Shaftesbury Workhouse Act 1697	The whole act.
16 Geo. 2. c. 9	St Botolph, Aldgate Poor Relief Act 1742	The whole act.
19 Geo. 2. c. 15	Bethnal Green, Church Completion and Poor Relief Act 1745	The whole act.
4 Geo. 3. c. 90	Loddon and Clavering (Norfolk) Poor Relief Act 1764	The whole act.
6 Geo. 3. c. 64	St Botolph, Aldgate Poor Relief Act 1766	The whole act.
7 Geo. 3. c. 72	Queensborough Poor Relief Act 1767	The whole act.
15 Geo. 3. c. 13	East and West Flegg Poor Relief Act 1775	The whole act.
15 Geo. 3. c. 59	Mitford and Launditch (Norfolk) Poor Relief Act 1775	The whole act.
16 Geo. 3. c. 9	Forehoe Poor Relief Act 1776	The whole act.
19 Geo. 3. c. 13	Hartsmere, etc (Suffolk) Poor Relief Act 1779	The whole act.
26 Geo. 3. c. 28	Romford Poor Relief Act 1786	The whole act.
30 Geo. 3. c. 81	Manchester Poor Relief Act 1790	The whole act.
31 Geo. 3. c. 24	Oswestry Poor Relief Act 1791	The whole act.
31 Geo. 3. c. 78	Ellesmere Poor Relief Act 1791	The whole act.
32 Geo. 3. c. 20	Stone Poor Relief Act 1792	The whole act.
32 Geo. 3. c. 70	Tewkesbury Poor Relief Act 1792	The whole act.
32 Geo. 3. c. 85	Whitchurch (Salop) Poor Relief Act 1792	The whole act.
32 Geo. 3. c. 95	Salop Poor Relief Act 1792	The whole act.
35 Geo. 3. c. 61	Bishopsgate Poor Relief Act 1795	The whole act.
36 Geo. 3. c. 102	Lincoln Poor Relief Act 1796	The whole act.
39 Geo. 3. c. xlii	Samford Poor Relief Act 1799	The whole act.
39 & 40 Geo. 3. c. xlviii	Aldbourne Workhouse and Overseers Act 1800	The whole act.
41 Geo. 3. (U.K.) c. lxiii	Mitford and Launditch (Norfolk) Poor Relief Act 1801	The whole act.
46 Geo. 3. c. xliv	Norfolk Poor Relief Act 1806	The whole act.
47 Geo. 3 Sess. 2. c. lxxiii	Cosford and Polstead Poor Relief Act 1807	The whole act.
52 Geo. 3. c. xii	Wangford (Suffolk) Poor Relief Act 1812	The whole act.
52 Geo. 3. c. xiii	Westfirle, Beddingham and Glynde Poor Relief Act 1812	The whole act.
53 Geo. 3. c. cxxvii	Colneis and Carlford Poor Relief Act 1813	The whole act.
54 Geo. 3. c. xliv	Forehoe Poor Relief Act 1814	The whole act.
56 Geo. 3. c. v	Mitcham Parish Rates Act 1816	The whole act.
56 Geo. 3. c. lxvi	Shardlow and Wilne Poor Relief Act 1816	The whole act.
1 Geo. 4. c. vi	Blything Poor Relief Act 1820	The whole act.
5 Geo. 4. c. xiii	Hull Poor Relief Act 1824	The whole act.
5 Geo. 4. c. xviii	Stow Poor Relief Act 1824	The whole act.
5 Geo. 4. c. xli	South Lynn Poor Relief Act 1824	The whole act.
6 Geo. 4. c. cxxiii	Montgomery and Pool Poor Relief Act 1825	The whole act.
7 Geo. 4. c. i	Loes and Wilford Poor Relief Act 1826	The whole act.
7 Geo. 4. c. cxli	Shrewsbury Poor Relief Act 1826	The whole act.
1 Will. 4. c. iv	Bristol Poor Relief Act 1831	The whole act.
2 & 3 Will. 4. c. x	Leicester Rates and Poor Relief Act 1832	The whole act.
3 & 4 Will. 4. c. ii	Bosmere and Claydon Poor Relief Act 1833	The whole act.
3 & 4 Will. 4. c. xlviii	Wangford (Suffolk) Poor Relief Act 1833	The whole act.
3 & 4 Will. 4. c. cvii	Forehoe Poor Relief Act 1833	The whole act.
21 & 22 Vict. c. lxii	Manchester Overseers Act 1858	The whole act.
Group 2 – Provisional Orders Confirmation Repeals
31 & 32 Vict. c. cl	Salisbury Poor Relief Act 1868	The whole act.
32 & 33 Vict. c. cxxiii	Poor Law Board's Provisional Orders Confirmation Act 1869	The whole act.
38 & 39 Vict. c. clxviii	Local Government Board's Poor Law Provisional Orders Confirmation (Oxford, &c.) Act 1875	The whole act.
41 & 42 Vict. c. civ	Local Government Board's (Poor Law) Provisional Orders Confirmation (Birmingham, &c.) Act 1878	The whole act.
42 & 43 Vict. c. cvi	Local Government Board's Provisional Orders Confirmation (Poor Law) Act 1879	The whole act.
51 & 52 Vict. c. xciv	Local Government Board's Provisional Order Confirmation (Poor Law) (No.7) Act 1888	The whole act.
52 & 53 Vict. c. cxviii	Local Government Board's Provisional Order Confirmation (Poor Law) Act 1889	The whole act.

=== Part 9: Railways ===
Part 9 listed acts relating to railways.

Schedule 1, Part 9 – Railways
Citation	Short title	Extent of repeal
Group 1 – Abortive Railway Projects
(1) Afon Valley Railway Company
28 & 29 Vict. c. ccclxxvi	Afon Valley Railway Act 1865	The whole act.
29 & 30 Vict. c. xlv	Afon Valley Railway Act 1866	The whole act.
(2) Alexandra Park Railway Company
34 & 35 Vict. c. cxcix	Alexandra Park Railway Act 1871	The whole act.
37 & 38 Vict. c. lxxix	Alexandra Park Railway Abandonment Act 1874	The whole act.
(3) Athenry and Tuam Railway Company
21 & 22 Vict. c. cxii	Athenry and Tuam Railway Act 1858	The whole act.
23 & 24 Vict. c. clxxxii	Athenry and Tuam Railway (Leasing or Sale) Act 1860	The whole act.
40 & 41 Vict. c. liii	Athenry and Tuam Railway (Claremorris Abandonment) Act 1877	The whole act.
(4) Barry Railway Company
28 & 29 Vict. c. ccxxxiv	Barry Railway Act 1865	The whole act.
29 & 30 Vict. c. xcii	Barry Railway (Alteration) Act 1866	The whole act.
29 & 30 Vict. c. cccxxxiii	Barry Railway (Extension) Act 1866	The whole act.
31 & 32 Vict. c. xcvii	Barry Railway Act 1868	The whole act.
(5) Birmingham and Lichfield Junction Railway Company
35 & 36 Vict. c. clxxii	Birmingham and Lichfield Junction Railway Act 1872	The whole act.
37 & 38 Vict. c. xcii	Birmingham and Lichfield Junction Railway (Deviation) Act 1874	The whole act.
38 & 39 Vict. c. lii	Birmingham and Lichfield Junction Railway Act 1875	The whole act.
40 & 41 Vict. c. ccxiii	Birmingham and Lichfield Junction Railway Act 1877	The whole act.
(6) Bodmin Railway Company
27 & 28 Vict. c. clxx	Bodmin Railway Act 1864	The whole act.
28 & 29 Vict. c. liii	Bodmin Railway Act 1865	The whole act.
30 & 31 Vict. c. cxix	Bodmin Railway Act 1867	The whole act.
(7) Bourton-On-The-Water Railway Company
27 & 28 Vict. c. ccx	Bourton-on-the-Water Railway (Extension to Cheltenham) Act 1864	The whole act.
30 & 31 Vict. c. cxciii	Bourton-on-the-Water Railway (Extension to Cheltenham) Abandonment Act 1867	The whole act.
(8) Bristol and South Wales Junction Railway Company
9 & 10 Vict. c. cv	Bristol and South Wales Junction Railway Act 1846	The whole act.
10 & 11 Vict. c. lxxxi	Bristol and South Wales Junction Railway and Aust Ferry Act 1847	The whole act.
(9) Central Cornwall Railway Company
27 & 28 Vict. c. cclxxxix	Launceston, Bodmin, and Wadebridge Junction Railway Act 1864	The whole act.
28 & 29 Vict. c. ccclxxiv	Central Cornwall Railway Act 1865	The whole act.
30 & 31 Vict. c. cxcix	Central Cornwall Railway Act 1867	The whole act.
(10) Clay Cross Railway Company
2 Edw. 7. c. clxxxiii	Clay Cross Railway Act 1902	The whole act.
5 Edw. 7. c. xxvii	Clay Cross Railway (Abandonment) Act 1905	The whole act.
(11) Columbia Market Railway
48 & 49 Vict. c. lxxiv	Columbia Market Act 1885	The whole act.
51 & 52 Vict. c. iii	Columbia Market (Extension of Time) Act 1888	The whole act.
53 & 54 Vict. c. iii	Columbia Market Railways (Abandonment) Act 1890	The whole act.
(12) Cork and Fermoy and Waterford and Wexford Railway Company
53 & 54 Vict. c. ccxlii	Cork and Fermoy and Waterford and Wexford Railway Act 1890	The whole act.
56 & 57 Vict. c. v	Cork and Fermoy and Waterford and Wexford Railway (Guarantee) Act 1893	The whole act.
56 & 57 Vict. c. xlvi	Cork and Fermoy Railway (Waterford and Wexford Section Abandonment) Act 1893	The whole act.
(13) Fareham and Netley Railway Company
28 & 29 Vict. c. cliii	Fareham and Netley Railway Act 1865	The whole act.
31 & 32 Vict. c. clix	Fareham and Netley Railway Act 1868	The whole act.
(14) Guiseley Yeadon and Headingley Railway Company
54 & 55 Vict. c. cxcviii	Leeds and Yeadon Railway Act 1891	The whole act.
56 & 57 Vict. c. xxiv	Guiseley Yeadon and Headingley Railway (Abandonment) Act 1893	The whole act.
(15) Kensington Station and North and South London Junction Railway Company
22 & 23 Vict. c. cxxviii	Kensington Station and North and South London Junction Railway Act 1859	The whole act.
25 & 26 Vict. c. ccxv	Kensington Station and North and South London Junction Railway Act 1862	The whole act.
(16) Llanfyllin and Llangynog Railway Company
36 & 37 Vict. c. lxx	Llanfyllin and Llangynog Railway Act 1873	The whole act.
39 & 40 Vict. c. lxxviii	Llanfyllin and Llangynog Railway Abandonment Act 1876	The whole act.
(17) London Walthamstow and Epping Forest Railway Company
61 & 62 Vict. c. lxii	London Walthamstow and Epping Forest Railway Act 1898	The whole act.
62 & 63 Vict. c. ccxlix	London Walthamstow and Epping Forest Railway Act 1899	The whole act.
63 & 64 Vict. c. cclii	London Walthamstow and Epping Forest Railway (Abandonment) Act 1900	The whole act.
(18) London, Worcester, and South Wales Railway Company
28 & 29 Vict. c. cclxx	London, Worcester, and South Wales Railway Act 1865	The whole act.
29 & 30 Vict. c. clxiv	London, Worcester, and South Wales Railway (Deviation) Act 1866	The whole act.
(19) Lynton Railway Company
48 & 49 Vict. c. cliv	Lynton Railway Act 1885	The whole act.
50 Vict. c. xxxii	Lynton Railway Act 1886	The whole act.
53 & 54 Vict. c. ccxlv	Lynton Railway Act 1890	The whole act.
(20) North East London Railway Company
5 Edw. 7. c. ccviii	North East London Railway Act 1905	The whole act.
6 Edw. 7. c. lxxxviii	North East London Railway Act 1906	The whole act.
7 Edw. 7. c. x	North East London Railway Act 1907	The whole act.
8 Edw. 7. c. xxxv	North East London Railway Act 1908	The whole act.
9 Edw. 7. c. l	North East London Railway Act 1909	The whole act.
(21) Rickmansworth, Amersham, and Chesham Railway Company
25 & 26 Vict. c. clxxi	Rickmansworth, Amersham, and Chesham Railway Act 1862	The whole act.
27 & 28 Vict. c. cclxxvi	Rickmansworth, Amersham, and Chesham Railway (Level Crossing at Rickmansworth) Act 1864	The whole act.
28 & 29 Vict. c. cxlvii	Rickmansworth, Amersham, and Chesham Railway Amendment Act 1865	The whole act.
(22) Ruthin and Cerrig-Y-Druidion Railway Company
39 & 40 Vict. c. lxxxi	Ruthin and Cerrig-y-druidion Railway Act 1876	The whole act.
44 & 45 Vict. c. xlii	Ruthin and Cerrig-y-druidion Railway (Amendment) Act 1881	The whole act.
47 & 48 Vict. c. lxx	Ruthin and Cerrig-y-druidion Railway (Abandonment) Act 1884	The whole act.
(23) Saint Ives and West Cornwall Junction Railway Company (1)
16 & 17 Vict. c. clv	Saint Ives and West Cornwall Junction Railway Act 1853	The whole act.
19 & 20 Vict. c. xli	Saint Ives and West Cornwall Junction Railway Act 1856	The whole act.
(24) Saint Ives and West Cornwall Junction Railway Company (2)
26 & 27 Vict. c. ccxxx	Saint Ives and West Cornwall Junction Railway Act 1863	The whole act.
31 & 32 Vict. c. cxxi	Saint Ives and West Cornwall Junction Railway Amendment Act 1868	The whole act.
(25) Sandbach and Winsford Junction Railway Company
35 & 36 Vict. c. lxxvi	Sandbach and Winsford Junction Railway Act 1872	The whole act.
38 & 39 Vict. c. lxv	Sandbach and Winsford Junction Railway Abandonment Act 1875	The whole act.
(26) Selby and Mid-Yorkshire Union Railway Company
52 & 53 Vict. c. lxxiii	Selby and Mid-Yorkshire Union Railway (Wistow to Drax) Abandonment Act 1889	The whole act.
53 & 54 Vict. c. xii	Selby and Mid-Yorkshire Union Railway (Abandonment) Act 1890	The whole act.
(27) Severn Bridge and Forest of Dean Central Railway Company
42 & 43 Vict. c. xxxii	Severn Bridge and Forest of Dean Central Railway Act 1879	The whole act.
45 & 46 Vict. c. ccvi	Severn Bridge and Forest of Dean Central Railway Act 1882	The whole act.
47 & 48 Vict. c. xxxiv	Severn Bridge and Forest of Dean Central Railway (Abandonment) Act 1884	The whole act.
(28) Sidmouth Railway and Harbour Company
25 & 26 Vict. c. ccxxvii	Sidmouth Railway and Harbour Act 1862	The whole act.
28 & 29 Vict. c. ccxxxvii	Sidmouth Railway and Harbour Act 1865	The whole act.
30 & 31 Vict. c. cv	Sidmouth Railway and Harbour Act 1867	The whole act.
(29) Southern Railway Company (Ireland)
28 & 29 Vict. c. cccliii	Southern Railway Act 1865	The whole act.
29 & 30 Vict. c. cclxxi	Southern Railway (Deviation and Branches) Act 1866	The whole act.
34 & 35 Vict. c. ccvi	Southern Railway (Additional Powers) Act 1871	The whole act.
36 & 37 Vict. c. ccxlviii	Southern Railway (Extension and Further Powers) Act 1873	The whole act.
37 & 38 Vict. c. cxcvi	Southern Railway (Further Powers) Act 1874	The whole act.
39 & 40 Vict. c. ccxlii	Southern Railway Act 1876	The whole act.
41 & 42 Vict. c. cxxiii	Southern Railway Act 1878	The whole act.
43 & 44 Vict. c. lvi	Southern Railway (Cashel Extension Abandonment) Act 1880	The whole act.
(30) South Essex Railway Company
28 & 29 Vict. c. cccxliv	South Essex Railway Act 1865	The whole act.
29 & 30 Vict. c. cccxl	South Essex Railway Act 1866	The whole act.
(31) Sunningdale and Cambridge Town Railway Company
27 & 28 Vict. c. ccvii	Sunningdale and Cambridge Town Railway Act 1864	The whole act.
28 & 29 Vict. c. cxcvii	Sunningdale and Cambridge Town Railway (Extensions) Act 1865	The whole act.
29 & 30 Vict. c. clxi	Sunningdale and Cambridge Town Railway (Alterations) Act 1866	The whole act.
(32) Usk and Towy Railway Company
34 & 35 Vict. c. clxxiii	Usk and Towy Railway Act 1871	The whole act.
37 & 38 Vict. c. lxxx	Usk and Towy Railway Act 1874	The whole act.
40 & 41 Vict. c. cxliv	Usk and Towy Railway Act 1877	The whole act.
(33) Uxbridge and Rickmansworth Railway Company (1)
24 & 25 Vict. c. lxxiii	Uxbridge and Rickmansworth Railway Act 1861	The whole act.
25 & 26 Vict. c. xxxvi	Uxbridge and Rickmansworth Railway Act 1862	The whole act.
26 & 27 Vict. c. clxxiii	Uxbridge and Rickmansworth Railway Amendment Act 1863	The whole act.
29 & 30 Vict. c. cxli	Uxbridge and Rickmansworth Railway Act 1866	The whole act.
31 & 32 Vict. c. li	Uxbridge and Rickmansworth Railway (Further Time) Act 1868	The whole act.
(34) Uxbridge and Rickmansworth Railway Company (2)
47 & 48 Vict. c. cxciii	Uxbridge and Rickmansworth Railway Act 1884	The whole act.
51 & 52 Vict. c. x	Uxbridge and Rickmansworth Railway (Abandonment) Act 1888	The whole act.
(35) Waterloo and Whitehall Railway Company
28 & 29 Vict. c. cclviii	Waterloo and Whitehall Railway Act 1865	The whole act.
30 & 31 Vict. c. cxcvii	Waterloo and Whitehall Railway (Amendment) Act 1867	The whole act.
31 & 32 Vict. c. clxix	Waterloo and Whitehall Railway Act 1868	The whole act.
(36) Weald of Kent Railway Company
27 & 28 Vict. c. ccxxxiii	Weald of Kent Railway Act 1864	The whole act.
28 & 29 Vict. c. lxxxii	Weald of Kent Railway Act 1865	The whole act.
(37) Wensum Valley Railway Company
27 & 28 Vict. c. clxxxii	Wensum Valley Railway Act 1864	The whole act.
30 & 31 Vict. c. cxxiv	Wensum Valley Railway Abandonment Act 1867	The whole act.
(38) West Metropolitan Railway Company
62 & 63 Vict. c. ccl	West Metropolitan Railway Act 1899	The whole act.
4 Edw. 7. c. xxi	West Metropolitan Railway (Abandonment) Act 1904	The whole act.
(39) Westminster Terminus Railway Company
18 & 19 Vict. c. cxcviii	Westminster Terminus Railway Extension Act, Clapham to Norwood, 1855	The whole act.
19 & 20 Vict. c. cxxx	West End of London and Clapham and Norwood Junction Railway Act 1856	The whole act.
20 & 21 Vict. c. c	Westminster Terminus Railway Extension, Clapham to Norwood, Abandonment Act 1857	The whole act.
21 & 22 Vict. c. cxlv	West End of London and Clapham and Norwood Junction Railway Abandonment Act 1858	The whole act.
(40) West Sussex Junction Railway Company
27 & 28 Vict. c. cclxxviii	West Sussex Junction Railway Act 1864	The whole act.
28 & 29 Vict. c. cxxvii	West Sussex Junction Railway Deviation Act 1865	The whole act.
30 & 31 Vict. c. cliv	West Sussex Junction Railway Act 1867	The whole act.
(41) Wilts and Gloucestershire Railway Company
27 & 28 Vict. c. ccxxii	Wilts and Gloucestershire Railway Act 1864	The whole act.
30 & 31 Vict. c. lvii	Wilts and Gloucestershire Railway Act 1867	The whole act.
(42) Worcester, Dean Forest, and Monmouth Railway Company
26 & 27 Vict. c. clxxxv	Worcester, Dean Forest, and Monmouth Railway Act 1863	The whole act.
27 & 28 Vict. c. ccxcv	Worcester, Dean Forest, and Monmouth Railway (Extension to Gloucester) Act 1864	The whole act.
28 & 29 Vict. c. cccxix	Worcester, Dean Forest, and Monmouth Railway Act 1865	The whole act.
(43) General Repeals
26 & 27 Vict. c. ccxvi	Hadlow Railway Act 1863	The whole act.
27 & 28 Vict. c. lxxx	Ribblesdale Railway Act 1864	The whole act.
27 & 28 Vict. c. cxcvii	Helston and Penryn Junction Railway Act 1864	The whole act.
27 & 28 Vict. c. ccli	West Grinstead, Cuckfield, and Hayward's Heath Junction Railway Act 1864	The whole act.
27 & 28 Vict. c. cccx	Petersfield and Bishop's Waltham Railway Act 1864	The whole act.
28 & 29 Vict. c. xxiii	Luddenden Valley Railway Act 1865	The whole act.
28 & 29 Vict. c. cciii	Skipton and Wharfdale Railway Act 1865	The whole act.
28 & 29 Vict. c. ccxciii	Coventry and Great Western Junction Railway Act 1865	The whole act.
28 & 29 Vict. c. ccxcvi	Deal and Dover Railway Act 1865	The whole act.
28 & 29 Vict. c. cclxiii	Bude Canal and Launceston Junction Railway Act 1865	The whole act.
28 & 29 Vict. c. cccxviii	Wiltshire Railway Act 1865	The whole act.
28 & 29 Vict. c. cccxxxviii	North and South Wiltshire Junction Railway Act 1865	The whole act.
28 & 29 Vict. c. cccli	Waterford, Lismore, and Fermoy Railway Act 1865	The whole act.
28 & 29 Vict. c. ccclxix	Limerick and North Kerry Junction Railway Act 1865	The whole act.
28 & 29 Vict. c. ccclxxiii	Saltash and Callington Railway Act 1865	The whole act.
28 & 29 Vict. c. ccclxxv	North Kent Railway Extension Railway Act 1865	The whole act.
29 & 30 Vict. c. cliv	Berks and Hants Extension Railway (Extension) Act 1866	The whole act.
29 & 30 Vict. c. clxvi	Great Northern Railway (Barnet Branch Abandonment) Act 1866	The whole act.
29 & 30 Vict. c. ccxxxviii	West Bromwich and Walsall Railway Act 1866	The whole act.
29 & 30 Vict. c. cclxxix	Laugharne Railway Act 1866	The whole act.
29 & 30 Vict. c. ccciv	Aberdare and Central Wales Junction Railway Act 1866	The whole act.
29 & 30 Vict. c. cccxvi	Elham Valley Railway Act 1866	The whole act.
29 & 30 Vict. c. cccxlv	Teme Valley Railway Act 1866	The whole act.
29 & 30 Vict. c. cccxlix	Brampton and Longtown Railway Act 1866	The whole act.
31 & 32 Vict. c. lv	West Riding and Grimsby Railway (Abandonment) Act 1868	The whole act.
31 & 32 Vict. c. lxxi	Ilfracombe Railway (Abandonment) Act 1868	The whole act.
31 & 32 Vict. c. cxxiii	London, Lewes, and Brighton Railways Abandonment Act 1868	The whole act.
32 & 33 Vict. c. xciii	Southsea Railway (Abandonment) Act 1869	The whole act.
37 & 38 Vict. c. cvi	Harrow, Edgware, and London Railway (Abandonment) Act 1874	The whole act.
38 & 39 Vict. c. xlv	Truro and Perran Mineral Railway (Abandonment) Act 1875	The whole act.
38 & 39 Vict. c. cxiv	London Central Railway (Abandonment) Act 1875	The whole act.
40 & 41 Vict. c. xi	Leeds, Roundhay Park, and Osmondthorpe Junction Railway (Abandonment) Act 1877	The whole act.
40 & 41 Vict. c. xli	Fareham Railway Abandonment Act 1877	The whole act.
40 & 41 Vict. c. xlii	Sheffield and Midland Railway Companies Committee Abandonment Act 1877	The whole act.
40 & 41 Vict. c. lv	Temple Mineral Railway (Abandonment) Act 1877	The whole act.
40 & 41 Vict. c. cv	Freshwater, Yarmouth, and Newport Railway (Abandonment) Act 1877	The whole act.
40 & 41 Vict. c. ccxxxii	Harrow and Rickmansworth Railway (Abandonment) Act 1877	The whole act.
40 & 41 Vict. c. ccxxxix	London, Essex, and Kent Coast Junction Railway (Abandonment) Act 1877	The whole act.
41 & 42 Vict. c. v	Birkenhead, Chester, and North Wales Railway (Abandonment) Act 1878	The whole act.
41 & 42 Vict. c. vi	Bodmin and Wadebridge and Delabole Railway (Abandonment) Act 1878	The whole act.
41 & 42 Vict. c. vii	Cornwall Mineral and Bodmin and Wadebridge Junction Railway (Abandonment) Act 1878	The whole act.
41 & 42 Vict. c. xxv	Somerset and Dorset Railway (Nettlebridge Branch Railway Abandonment) Act 1878	The whole act.
41 & 42 Vict. c. lxxxv	Nettlebridge Valley Railway (Abandonment) Act 1878	The whole act.
42 & 43 Vict. c. xv	Brewood and Wolverhampton Railway (Abandonment) Act 1879	The whole act.
43 & 44 Vict. c. xii	Worcester and Aberystwith Junction Railway (Abandonment) Act 1880	The whole act.
43 & 44 Vict. c. xv	Wednesfield and Wyrley Bank Railway (Abandonment) Act 1880	The whole act.
43 & 44 Vict. c. xix	Ely and Bury Saint Edmunds Railway (Abandonment) Act 1880	The whole act.
43 & 44 Vict. c. lxv	Manchester and Milford Railway (Devil's Bridge Branch Abandonment) Act 1880	The whole act.
45 & 46 Vict. c. xli	Welshpool and Llanfair Railway (Abandonment) Act 1882	The whole act.
45 & 46 Vict. c. cxxi	Cheadle Railway (Abandonment) Act 1882	The whole act.
46 & 47 Vict. c. clxx	Market Deeping Railway (Abandonment) Act 1883	The whole act.
47 & 48 Vict. c. xxxi	Upwell Outwell and Wisbech Railway (Abandonment) Act 1884	The whole act.
47 & 48 Vict. c. lv	Totnes, Paignton and Torquay Direct Railway (Abandonment) Act 1884	The whole act.
48 & 49 Vict. c. xiv	Skipton and Kettlewell Railway (Abandonment) Act 1885	The whole act.
48 & 49 Vict. c. xxi	Tilbury and Gravesend Tunnel Junction Railway (Abandonment) Act 1885	The whole act.
48 & 49 Vict. c. lxxi	Charing Cross and Waterloo Electric Railway (Abandonment) Act 1885	The whole act.
48 & 49 Vict. c. clxiii	Metropolitan Outer Circle Railway (Abandonment) Act 1885	The whole act.
49 & 50 Vict. c. iii	Beaconsfield, Uxbridge and Harrow Railway (Abandonment) Act 1886	The whole act.
49 & 50 Vict. c. xxix	Radstock, Wrington and Congresbury Junction Railway (Abandonment) Act 1886	The whole act.
50 Vict. c. li	Midland and Central Wales Junction Railway (Abandonment) Act 1886	The whole act.
50 & 51 Vict. c. xxxvii	London, Hendon and Harrow Railway (Abandonment) Act 1887	The whole act.
50 & 51 Vict. c. lxviii	Bishop's Castle and Montgomery Railway (Abandonment) Act 1887	The whole act.
50 & 51 Vict. c. cviii	Merionethshire Railway (Abandonment) Act 1887	The whole act.
51 & 52 Vict. c. iv	Billinghay and Metheringham (Light) Railway (Abandonment) Act 1888	The whole act.
51 & 52 Vict. c. viii	Isle of Axholme Railway (Abandonment) Act 1888	The whole act.
51 & 52 Vict. c. cc	Rotherham and Bawtry Railway (Abandonment) Act 1888	The whole act.
52 & 53 Vict. c. lxxxi	Oswestry and Llangynog Railway (Abandonment) Act 1889	The whole act.
52 & 53 Vict. c. cliii	Burry Port and North Western Junction Railway (Abandonment) Act 1889	The whole act.
53 & 54 Vict. c. xxvi	Llangammarch and Neath and Brecon Junction Railway (Abandonment) Act 1890	The whole act.
53 & 54 Vict. c. xxxiv	Burnley Clitheroe and Sabden Railway (Abandonment) Act 1890	The whole act.
53 & 54 Vict. c. xlviii	Kenmare Junction Railway (Abandonment) Act 1890	The whole act.
54 & 55 Vict. c. x	Pewsey and Salisbury Railway (Abandonment) Act 1891	The whole act.
54 & 55 Vict. c. xvii	Ogmore Dock and Railway (Abandonment) Act 1891	The whole act.
54 & 55 Vict. c. cxx	Great Western and Great Northern Junction Railway (Abandonment) Act 1891	The whole act.
54 & 55 Vict. c. cxxxiii	Beverley and East Riding Railway (Abandonment) Act 1891	The whole act.
54 & 55 Vict. c. clxxiv	Lincoln Horncastle Spilsby and Skegness Railway (Abandonment) Act 1891	The whole act.
55 & 56 Vict. c. ii	Welshpool and Llanfair Railway (Abandonment) Act 1892	The whole act.
55 & 56 Vict. c. xvi	Felixstowe and Bawdsey Ferry Railway (Abandonment) Act 1892	The whole act.
55 & 56 Vict. c. xx	Holsworthy and Bude Railway (Abandonment) Act 1892	The whole act.
55 & 56 Vict. c. xxxv	St. Austell Valleys Railway and Dock (Abandonment) Act 1892	The whole act.
55 & 56 Vict. c. lxxix	Eastbourne Seaford and Newhaven Railway (Abandonment) Act 1892	The whole act.
55 & 56 Vict. c. xcvi	Porthdinlleyn Railway (Abandonment) Act 1892	The whole act.
55 & 56 Vict. c. cxxvi	Whitland Cronware and Pendine Railway (Abandonment) Act 1892	The whole act.
56 & 57 Vict. c. lxxxviii	North West Central Railway (Abandonment) Act 1893	The whole act.
56 & 57 Vict. c. cciii	Towcester and Buckingham Railway (Abandonment) Act 1893	The whole act.
57 & 58 Vict. c. xi	Worcester and Broom Railway (Abandonment) Act 1894	The whole act.
57 & 58 Vict. c. cxliv	Brighton Rottingdean and Newhaven Direct Railway (Abandonment) Act 1894	The whole act.
58 & 59 Vict. c. vi	Metropolitan Outer Circle Railway (Abandonment) Act 1895	The whole act.
61 & 62 Vict. c. ccxlvi	Kingstown and Kingsbridge Junction Railway (Abandonment) Act 1898	The whole act.
62 & 63 Vict. c. xxii	Woodhouse and Conisbrough Railway (Abandonment) Act 1899	The whole act.
63 & 64 Vict. c. xcv	Latimer Road and Acton Railway Act 1900	The whole act.
1 Edw. 7. c. cix	Bideford and Clovelly Railway (Abandonment) Act 1901	The whole act.
2 Edw. 7. c. iii	Lincoln and East Coast Railway and Dock (Abandonment) Act 1902	The whole act.
2 Edw. 7. c. cclx	Bexhill and Rotherfield Railway (Abandonment) Act 1902	The whole act.
5 Edw. 7. c. iv	Southampton and Winchester Great Western Junction Railway (Abandonment) Act 1905	The whole act.
5 Edw. 7. c. xxiv	Hastings Harbour District Railway (Abandonment) Act 1905	The whole act.
7 Edw. 7. c. xii	Plymouth and North Devon Direct Railway (Abandonment) Act 1907	The whole act.
(44) Scottish Repeals
44 & 45 Vict. c. lxxix	Glencairn Railway (Abandonment) Act 1881	The whole act.
46 & 47 Vict. c. iii	Rhins of Galloway Railway (Abandonment) Act 1883	The whole act.
55 & 56 Vict. c. xii	Clyde Ardrishaig and Crinan Railway (Abandonment) Act 1892	The whole act.
63 & 64 Vict. c. ccliii	Muirkirk Mauchline and Dalmellington Railways (Abandonment) Act 1900	The whole act.
4 Edw. 7. c. cxxxiii	Motherwell and Bellshill Railway (Abandonment) Order Confirmation Act 1904	The whole act.
Group 2 – Rates and Charges
16 & 17 Vict. c. ccxi	Liverpool, Crosby, and Southport Railway Amendment Act 1853	The whole act.
54 & 55 Vict. c. ccxiv	Great Eastern Railway Company (Rates and Charges) Order Confirmation Act 1891	The whole act.
54 & 55 Vict. c. ccxv	Great Northern Railway Company (Rates and Charges) Order Confirmation Act 1891	The whole act.
54 & 55 Vict. c. ccxvi	London and South Western Railway Company (Rates and Charges) Order Confirmation Act 1891	The whole act.
54 & 55 Vict. c. ccxvii	London, Brighton, and South Coast Railway Company (Rates and Charges) Order Confirmation Act 1891	The whole act.
54 & 55 Vict. c. ccxviii	London, Chatham, and Dover Railway Company (Rates and Charges) Order Confirmation Act 1891	The whole act.
54 & 55 Vict. c. ccxix	Midland Railway Company (Rates and Charges) Order Confirmation Act 1891	The whole act.
54 & 55 Vict. c. ccxx	South-Eastern Railway Company (Rates and Charges) Order Confirmation Act 1891	The whole act.
54 & 55 Vict. c. ccxxi	London and North Western Railway Company (Rates and Charges) Order Confirmation Act 1891	The whole act.
54 & 55 Vict. c. ccxxii	Great Western Railway Company (Rates and Charges) Order Confirmation Act 1891	The whole act.
55 & 56 Vict. c. xxxix	Railway Rates and Charges, No. 1 (Abbotsbury Railway, &c.), Order Confirmation Act 1892	The whole act.
55 & 56 Vict. c. xl	Railway Rates and Charges, No. 2 (Brecon and Merthyr Tydfil Junction Railway, &c.), Order Confirmation Act 1892	The whole act.
55 & 56 Vict. c. xli	Railway Rates and Charges, No. 3 (Cambrian Railway, &c.), Order Confirmation Act 1892	The whole act.
55 & 56 Vict. c. xlii	Railway Rates and Charges, No. 4 (Cleator and Workington Junction Railway, &c.), Order Confirmation Act 1892	The whole act.
55 & 56 Vict. c. xliii	Railway Rates and Charges, No. 5 (East London Railway, &c.), Order Confirmation Act 1892	The whole act.
55 & 56 Vict. c. xliv	Railway Rates and Charges, No. 6 (Festiniog Railway, &c.), Order Confirmation Act 1892	The whole act.
55 & 56 Vict. c. xlv	Railway Rates and Charges, No. 7 (Furness Railway, &c.), Order Confirmation Act 1892	The whole act.
55 & 56 Vict. c. xlvi	Railway Rates and Charges, No. 8 (Hull, Barnsley, and West Riding Junction Railway), Order Confirmation Act 1892	The whole act.
55 & 56 Vict. c. xlvii	Railway Rates and Charges, No. 9 (Isle of Wight Railway, &c.), Order Confirmation Act 1892	The whole act.
55 & 56 Vict. c. xlviii	Railway Rates and Charges, No. 10 (Lancashire and Yorkshire Railway, &c.), Order Confirmation Act 1892	The whole act.
55 & 56 Vict. c. xlix	Railway Rates and Charges, No. 11 (London, Tilbury, and Southend Railway, &c.), Order Confirmation Act 1892	The whole act.
55 & 56 Vict. c. l	Railway Rates and Charges, No. 12 (Manchester, Sheffield, and Lincolnshire Railway, &c.), Order Confirmation Act 1892	The whole act.
55 & 56 Vict. c. li	Railway Rates and Charges, No. 13 (Metropolitan Railway, &c.), Order Confirmation Act 1892	The whole act.
55 & 56 Vict. c. lii	Railway Rates and Charges, No. 14 (Midland and South Western Junction Railway, &c.), Order Confirmation Act 1892	The whole act.
55 & 56 Vict. c. liii	Railway Rates and Charges, No. 15 (North Eastern Railway, &c.), Order Confirmation Act 1892	The whole act.
55 & 56 Vict. c. liv	Railway Rates and Charges, No. 16 (North London Railway), Order Confirmation Act 1892	The whole act.
55 & 56 Vict. c. lv	Railway Rates and Charges, No. 17 (North Staffordshire Railway, &c.), Order Confirmation Act 1892	The whole act.
55 & 56 Vict. c. lvi	Railway Rates and Charges, No. 18 (Taff Vale Railway, &c.), Order Confirmation Act 1892	The whole act.
55 & 56 Vict. c. lvii	Railway Rates and Charges, No. 19 (Caledonian Railway, &c.), Order Confirmation Act 1892	The whole act.
55 & 56 Vict. c. lviii	Railway Rates and Charges, No. 20 (Callander and Oban Railway), Order Confirmation Act 1892	The whole act.
55 & 56 Vict. c. lix	Railway Rates and Charges, No. 21 (City of Glasgow Union Railway), Order Confirmation Act 1892	The whole act.
55 & 56 Vict. c. lx	Railway Rates and Charges, No. 22 (Glasgow and South Western Railway, &c.), Order Confirmation Act 1892	The whole act.
55 & 56 Vict. c. lxi	Railway Rates and Charges, No. 23 (Great North of Scotland Railway), Order Confirmation Act 1892	The whole act.
55 & 56 Vict. c. lxii	Railway Rates and Charges, No. 24 (Highland Railway), Order Confirmation Act 1892	The whole act.
55 & 56 Vict. c. lxiii	Railway Rates and Charges, No. 25 (North British Railway, &c.), Order Confirmation Act 1892	The whole act.
55 & 56 Vict. c. lxiv	Railway Rates and Charges, No. 26 (Athenry and Ennis Junction Railway, &c.), Order Confirmation Act 1892	The whole act.
56 & 57 Vict. c. cxii	Railway Rates and Charges (Cranbrook and Paddock Wood Railway, &c.) Order Confirmation Act 1893	The whole act.
57 & 58 Vict. c. xlviii	Railway Rates and Charges (Easingwold Railway, &c.) Order Confirmation Act 1894	The whole act.
57 & 58 Vict. c. lxxii	Mersey Railway (Rates and Charges) Act 1894	The whole act.
59 & 60 Vict. c. clxv	Railway Rates and Charges (Lee-on-the-Solent Light Railway, &c.) Order Confirmation Act 1896	The whole act.
9 Edw. 7. c. xcii	Railway Rates and Charges (Weston Clevedon and Portishead Light Railways) Order Confirmation Act 1909	The whole act.
Group 3 – Miscellaneous
(1) Midland Great Western Railway of Ireland
8 & 9 Vict. c. cxix	Midland Great Western Railway of Ireland Act 1845	The whole act.
9 & 10 Vict. c. ccx	Midland Great Western Railway of Ireland (Liffy Branch and Longford Deviation) Act 1846	The whole act.
9 & 10 Vict. c. ccxxiv	Midland Great Western Railway of Ireland Act (Mullingar to Athlone) 1846	The whole act.
10 & 11 Vict. c. cxxx	Midland Great Western Railway of Ireland (Newcastle, Anniskinnan and Baltrasna Deviations) Act 1847	The whole act.
10 & 11 Vict. c. clxxvi	Midland Great Western Railway of Ireland (Athlone to Galway Extension) Act 1847	The whole act.
11 & 12 Vict. c. lxxvi	Midland Great Western Railway of Ireland (Moate Deviation) Act 1848	The whole act.
12 & 13 Vict. c. 62	Advance of Money (Athlone to Galway Railway) Act 1849	The whole act.
13 & 14 Vict. c. lxxxviii	Midland Great Western Railway of Ireland (Deviations and Amendment) Act 1850	The whole act.
15 & 16 Vict. c. cxxxvii	Midland Great Western Railway of Ireland (Longford Deviation and Cavan Branch) Act 1852	The whole act.
20 & 21 Vict. c. lxxvii	Midland Great Western Railway of Ireland (Sligo Extension) Act 1857	The whole act.
20 & 21 Vict. c. cxiii	Midland Great Western Railway of Ireland (Streamstown and Clara Junction) Act 1857	The whole act.
21 & 22 Vict. c. xciv	Midland Great Western Railway of Ireland (Clara Deviation) Act 1858	The whole act.
22 & 23 Vict. c. liii	Midland Great Western Railway of Ireland (Liffey Branch) Act 1859	The whole act.
22 & 23 Vict. c. lxii	Midland Great Western Railway of Ireland (Sligo Extension) Act 1859	The whole act.
28 & 29 Vict. c. xl	Midland Great Western Railway of Ireland Act 1865	The whole act.
28 & 29 Vict. c. ccx	Midland Great Western Railway of Ireland (No.2) Act 1865	The whole act.
29 & 30 Vict. c. xxxiv	Midland Great Western Railway of Ireland Act 1866	The whole act.
32 & 33 Vict. c. lii	Midland Great Western Railway (of Ireland) Act 1869	The whole act.
34 & 35 Vict. c. lxix	Midland Great Western Railway of Ireland Act 1871	The whole act.
37 & 38 Vict. c. xxvii	Midland Great Western Railway of Ireland Act 1874	The whole act.
38 & 39 Vict. c. cxlviii	Midland Great Western, Dublin and Meath, and Navan and Kingscourt Railways Act 1875	The whole act.
40 & 41 Vict. c. cxxxix	Midland Great Western Railway of Ireland Act 1877	The whole act.
44 & 45 Vict. c. xcvii	Midland Great Western Railway of Ireland Act 1881	The whole act.
49 & 50 Vict. c. xxxviii	Midland Great Western Railway of Ireland Act 1886	The whole act.
50 & 51 Vict. c. cxlvi	Midland Great Western Railway of Ireland Act 1887	The whole act.
51 & 52 Vict. c. lxxi	Midland Great Western, Dublin and Meath, and Navan and Kingscourt Railways (Purchase) Act 1888	The whole act.
53 & 54 Vict. c. lxxvi	Midland Great Western and Great Northern and Western of Ireland Railways (Amalgamation) Act 1890	The whole act.
54 & 55 Vict. c. xli	Midland Great Western Railway of Ireland Act 1891	The whole act.
55 & 56 Vict. c. cxli	Midland Great Western Railway of Ireland Act 1892	The whole act.
57 & 58 Vict. c. cl	Midland Great Western Railway of Ireland Act 1894	The whole act.
63 & 64 Vict. c. ccli	Midland Great Western Railway of Ireland Act 1900	The whole act.
3 Edw. 7. c. clxiii	Midland Great Western Railway of Ireland Act 1903	The whole act.
9 Edw. 7. c. lxxvi	Midland Great Western Railway of Ireland Act 1909	The whole act.
(2) Railway Companies (accounts and Returns) Act 1911
1 & 2 Geo. 5. c. 34	Railway Companies (Accounts and Returns) Act 1911	The whole act.
2 & 3 Eliz. 2. c. 64	Transport Chargesetc(Miscellaneous Provisions) Act 1954	Section 10.
1996 c. 61	Channel Tunnel Rail Link Act 1996	In Schedule 9, in Part 2, paragraph 6.
2008 c. 18	Crossrail Act 2008	In Schedule 11, paragraph 5.

=== Part 10: Taxation and pensions ===
Part 10 covered taxation. A tax of two pennies Scots (equivalent to one sixth of an old penny sterling) was imposed by a series of local acts for specific burghs in Scotland. This allowed the burgh to raise money for local projects, such as road building. These acts included expiry dates, and were spent, having not been extended.

Schedule 1, Part 10 – Taxation and pensions
Citation	Short title	Extent of repeal or revocation
Group 1 – General Taxation The repeals and revocations shown in this group do not have retrospective effect.
15 & 16 Geo. 6 & 1 Eliz. 2. c. 10	Income Tax Act 1952	Section 228.
15 & 16 Geo. 6 & 1 Eliz. 2. c. 10	Income Tax Act 1952	Section 400(4).
15 & 16 Geo. 6 & 1 Eliz. 2. c. 10	Income Tax Act 1952	Section 406(6).
1968 c. 2	Provisional Collection of Taxes Act 1968	Section 1(1A).
1969 c. 32	Finance Act 1969	Section 11(5).
1969 c. 32	Finance Act 1969	Section 60.
1969 c. 32	Finance Act 1969	In Schedule 20, paragraph 11.
1970 c. 9	Taxes Management Act 1970	Section 43A(2A)(b).
1973 c. 51	Finance Act 1973	Schedule 16A.
1976 c. 85	National Insurance Surcharge Act 1976	The whole act.
1984 c. 43	Finance Act 1984	Section 117.
1985 c. 54	Finance Act 1985	Section 97.
1985 c. 54	Finance Act 1985	In Schedule 22, paragraph 6.
1988 c. 1	Income and Corporation Taxes Act 1988	Section 774.
1988 c. 1	Income and Corporation Taxes Act 1988	Sections 812 to 814.
1988 c. 1	Income and Corporation Taxes Act 1988	In section 843(4), the words “and 812”.
1988 c. 1	Income and Corporation Taxes Act 1988	In Schedule 30, paragraphs 9, 14, 15, 19 and 20.
1988 c. 39	Finance Act 1988	Section 31.
1988 c. 39	Finance Act 1988	Section 58.
1988 c. 39	Finance Act 1988	Section 61(1).
1988 c. 39	Finance Act 1988	In section 61(5), the words “Subsection (1) above shall have effect for the year 1988-89 and subsequent years of assessment; and”.
1988 c. 39	Finance Act 1988	Section 75.
1988 c. 39	Finance Act 1988	Section 119.
1988 c. 39	Finance Act 1988	Section 120.
1988 c. 39	Finance Act 1988	Section 122.
1988 c. 39	Finance Act 1988	In Schedule 3, paragraph 13.
1988 c. 39	Finance Act 1988	Schedule 5.
1989 c. 26	Finance Act 1989	Section 91.
1989 c. 26	Finance Act 1989	Section 92(1), (2).
1989 c. 26	Finance Act 1989	Section 96(1), (4).
1989 c. 26	Finance Act 1989	Section 114.
1989 c. 26	Finance Act 1989	Section 160(3).
1989 c. 26	Finance Act 1989	Section 162.
1991 c. 31	Finance Act 1991	Section 27(6).
1991 c. 31	Finance Act 1991	Section 46.
1991 c. 31	Finance Act 1991	Section 66.
1991 c. 31	Finance Act 1991	Section 75.
1991 c. 31	Finance Act 1991	In Schedule 6, paragraph 4.
1992 c. 48	Finance (No. 2) Act 1992	Sections 47 to 49.
1992 c. 48	Finance (No. 2) Act 1992	Section 63.
1992 c. 48	Finance (No. 2) Act 1992	Schedule 11.
1993 c. 34	Finance Act 1993	Section 67.
1993 c. 34	Finance Act 1993	Section 79(2).
1993 c. 34	Finance Act 1993	Section 107(2).
1993 c. 34	Finance Act 1993	Section 182(1)(ca).
1993 c. 34	Finance Act 1993	Section 205(3).
1993 c. 34	Finance Act 1993	In Schedule 6, paragraph 10.
1993 c. 34	Finance Act 1993	In Schedule 18, paragraph 6.
1993 c. 34	Finance Act 1993	In Schedule 23, in Part 6 (under the Provisional Collection of Taxes Act 1968) the words “and subsection (1A)”.
1994 c. 9	Finance Act 1994	Section 176(2).
1994 c. 9	Finance Act 1994	In Schedule 14, paragraphs 2 and 4.
1994 c. 9	Finance Act 1994	In Schedule 16, paragraph 5(1).
1994 c. 9	Finance Act 1994	In Schedule 17, paragraph 1.
1994 c. 9	Finance Act 1994	In Schedule 19, paragraphs 38, 39 and 40.
1995 c. 4	Finance Act 1995	Section 42(3) to (5).
1995 c. 4	Finance Act 1995	Section 57.
1995 c. 4	Finance Act 1995	In Schedule 6, paragraph 27.
1995 c. 4	Finance Act 1995	In Schedule 17, paragraphs 24 and 26.
1996 c. 8	Finance Act 1996	Section 153.
1996 c. 8	Finance Act 1996	Section 156.
1996 c. 8	Finance Act 1996	In Schedule 6, paragraph 11.
1996 c. 8	Finance Act 1996	In Schedule 7, paragraphs 20 and 26.
1996 c. 8	Finance Act 1996	In Schedule 14, paragraph 26.
1996 c. 8	Finance Act 1996	In Schedule 20, paragraph 38.
1996 c. 8	Finance Act 1996	In Schedule 21, paragraphs 19, 45, 46 and 48.
1996 c. 8	Finance Act 1996	In Schedule 36, paragraphs 1 and 3(11).
1996 c. 8	Finance Act 1996	In Schedule 37, paragraph 11(2)(b).
1997 c. 16	Finance Act 1997	Section 61.
1997 c. 58	Finance (No. 2) Act 1997	Section 17.
1997 c. 58	Finance (No. 2) Act 1997	In section 25, subsections (1), (5), (6) and (7).
1997 c. 58	Finance (No. 2) Act 1997	In Schedule 3, paragraph 9.
1997 c. 58	Finance (No. 2) Act 1997	In Schedule 4, paragraph 29.
1998 c. 36	Finance Act 1998	In section 30, subsections (2) to (6).
1998 c. 36	Finance Act 1998	Section 62.
1998 c. 36	Finance Act 1998	Sections 103 to 105.
1998 c. 36	Finance Act 1998	In section 106, subsections (4) to (9).
1998 c. 36	Finance Act 1998	Section 153.
1998 c. 36	Finance Act 1998	In Schedule 3, paragraphs 1, 2, 3, 4, 8, 11, 12, 13, 14, 15, 16, 17, 18, 19, 20, 21, 22, 23, 25, 26, 27, 28, 29, 30, 31, 32, 33, 34, 35, 36, 37, 38, 39, 41, 42, 43, 44, 45, 46, 47 and 48.
1998 c. 36	Finance Act 1998	In Schedule 7, in paragraph 1, the words “375A(1)(b),” and “770(2)(a)(iii) and (b)(iii),”.
1998 c. 36	Finance Act 1998	In Schedule 7, paragraph 2, in paragraph 3 the words “, 76(1) and (4)(a) and 112(1)”, paragraph 8 and paragraph 12.
1998 c. 36	Finance Act 1998	Schedule 11.
1999 c. 16	Finance Act 1999	Section 46.
1999 c. 16	Finance Act 1999	In Schedule 4, paragraphs 2, 3(2), 5(2)(b), (3), (4), 6, 7(2), 8, 9(2), 10, 11, 12, 13(a), 14(a), (b), 15(2)(b), (3), (4), (6), 17(2) and 18(1).
2000 c. 17	Finance Act 2000	In Schedule 30, paragraph 4(13) and (14), paragraphs 10, 14, 18 and 26.
2001 c. 2	Capital Allowances Act 2001	In section 542, the words “or relevant activity” in four places, and in the sub-heading to the section.
2001 c. 9	Finance Act 2001	Section 81.
2001 c. 9	Finance Act 2001	In Schedule 27, paragraph 7.
2002 c. 23	Finance Act 2002	Section 88(2)(a).
2003 c. 14	Finance Act 2003	In section 153(2)(a), the words “, 814(1)”.
2003 c. 14	Finance Act 2003	In section 207(2), the words “(b) Schedule 13B to that Act (elections as to transfer of children's tax credit),”.
2005 c. 5	Income Tax (Trading and Other Income) Act 2005	In Schedule 1, paragraphs 310, 326, 457(3) and 458(4).
2007 c. 3	Income Tax Act 2007	In section 45(1), the words “or (b) (as applicable)”.
2007 c. 3	Income Tax Act 2007	In section 45(3), the words “, and (b) £7,185, in any other case”.
2007 c. 3	Income Tax Act 2007	In section 46(1), the words “or (b) (as applicable)”.
2007 c. 3	Income Tax Act 2007	In section 46(3), the words “, and (b) £7,185, in any other case”.
2007 c. 3	Income Tax Act 2007	In section 47(4)(a), the words “or (b) (as applicable)” and in section 47(4)(b) the words “or (b) (as applicable)”.
2007 c. 3	Income Tax Act 2007	In section 48(4)(a), the words “or (b) (as applicable)” and in section 48(4)(b) the words “or (b) (as applicable)”.
2007 c. 3	Income Tax Act 2007	In section 57(1)(f), the words “and (b)” and in section 57(1)(g), the words “and (b)”.
2007 c. 3	Income Tax Act 2007	In section 57(3)(b), the words “and (b)” twice.
2007 c. 3	Income Tax Act 2007	Section 577(8)(a).
2007 c. 3	Income Tax Act 2007	In Schedule 1, paragraphs 254(c) (and the preceding “and”) and 359.
2009 c. 4	Corporation Tax Act 2009	In Schedule 1, paragraph 225.
2010 c. 4	Corporation Tax Act 2010	In Schedule 1, paragraphs 103 and 116.
2010 c. 8	Taxation (International and Other Provisions) Act 2010	In Schedule 8, paragraphs 30 and 31.
SI 1986/2211	The Charitable Deductions (Approved Schemes) Regulations 1986	Regulation 16.
SI 2000/2083	The Charitable Deductions (Approved Schemes) (Amendment No.2) Regulations 2000	Regulation 8.
SI 2003/282	The Income and Corporation Taxes (Electronic Communications) Regulations 2003	In regulation 2(1)(a)(iii), the words “30 or”.
SI 2003/1745	The Charitable Deductions (Approved Schemes) (Amendment) Regulations 2003	Regulation 7.
Group 2 – Scottish Local Taxation
38 Geo. 3. c. liv	Edinburgh Two Pennies Scots Act 1798	The whole act.
39 Geo. 3. c. xxxix	Port Glasgow and Newark Two Pennies Scots Act 1799	The whole act.
39 Geo. 3. c. xl	Glasgow and Gorbals Two Pennies Scots Act 1799	The whole act.
42 Geo. 3. c. xxvii	Dundee Two Pennies Scots Act 1802	The whole act.
42 Geo. 3. c. xxxiii	Kelso Two Pennies Scots Act 1802	The whole act.
44 Geo. 3. c. xxxvi	Dalkeith Improvement and Market Act 1804	The whole act.
47 Geo. 3 Sess. 2. c. xli	Burntisland Two Pennies Scots Act 1807	The whole act.
47 Geo. 3 Sess. 2. c. xlii	Kinghorn Two Pennies Scots Act 1807	The whole act.
48 Geo. 3. c. xiv	Aberbrothock Two Pennies Scots Act 1808	The whole act.
51 Geo. 3. c. xxxvii	Dumfries Two Pennies Scots Act 1811	The whole act.
56 Geo. 3. c. xxxv	Edinburgh Two Pennies Scots Act 1816	The whole act.
56 Geo. 3. c. xxxvii	Montrose Two Pennies Scots Act 1816	The whole act.
5 Geo. 4. c. xxxviii	Kelso Two Pennies Scots Act 1824	The whole act.
6 Geo. 4. c. xxxvi	Dalkeith Two Pennies Scots Act 1825	The whole act.
7 & 8 Geo. 4. c. xciii	Dundee Two Pennies Scots Act 1827	The whole act.
9 Geo. 4. c. xiii	Aberbrothock Two Pennies Scots Act 1828	The whole act.
Group 3 – Personal Accounts Delivery Authority
6 & 7 Eliz. 2. c. 51	Public Records Act 1958	In Schedule 1, in Part 2 of the Table, the entry for the Personal Accounts Delivery Authority.
1967 c. 13	Parliamentary Commissioner Act 1967	In Schedule 2, the entry for the Personal Accounts Delivery Authority.
1975 c. 24	House of Commons Disqualification Act 1975	In Schedule 1, in Part 2, the entry for the Personal Accounts Delivery Authority.
1975 c. 25	Northern Ireland Assembly Disqualification Act 1975	In Schedule 1, in Part 2, the entry for the Personal Accounts Delivery Authority.
2000 c. 36	Freedom of Information Act 2000	In Schedule 1, in Part 6, the entry for the Personal Accounts Delivery Authority.

=== Part 11: Turnpikes ===
Part 11 lists acts relating to long-since abolished turnpike trusts.

Schedule 1, Part 11 – Turnpikes
Citation	Short title	Extent of repeal
Group 1 – Gloucestershire and Oxfordshire
9 Will. 3. c. 18 (Note: This is the citation in The Statutes of the Realm.)	Gloucestershire Roads Act 1697	The whole act.
12 Geo. 1. c. 18	Tewkesbury Roads Act 1725	The whole act.
12 Geo. 1. c. 24	Gloucestershire Roads Act 1725	The whole act.
4 Geo. 2. c. 23	Oxford and Gloucester Roads Act 1730	The whole act.
17 Geo. 2. c. 10	Oxford and Gloucester Roads Act 1743	The whole act.
19 Geo. 2. c. 18	Gloucester Roads Act 1745	The whole act.
24 Geo. 2. c. 28	Gloucester and Oxford Roads Act 1750	The whole act.
26 Geo. 2. c. 70	Oxford and Gloucester Roads Act 1753	The whole act.
29 Geo. 2. c. 51	Gloucestershire Roads Act 1756	The whole act.
29 Geo. 2. c. 58	Gloucester Roads Act 1756	The whole act.
29 Geo. 2. c. 81	Berks Roads Act 1756	The whole act.
31 Geo. 2. c. 64	Gloucestershire Roads Act 1757	The whole act.
31 Geo. 2. c. 65	Gloucester Roads Act 1757	The whole act.
5 Geo. 3. c. 80	Oxford and Gloucester Roads Act 1765	The whole act.
8 Geo. 3. c. 41	Gloucester and Oxford Roads Act 1768	The whole act.
8 Geo. 3. c. 61	Abingdon to Swinford Roads Act 1768	The whole act.
11 Geo. 3. c. 73	Oxford Roads Act 1771	The whole act.
14 Geo. 3. c. 111	Gloucestershire Roads Act 1774	The whole act.
18 Geo. 3. c. 99	Berks Roads Act 1778	The whole act.
18 Geo. 3. c. 102	Gloucester Roads Act 1778	The whole act.
19 Geo. 3. c. 93	Gloucester Roads Act 1779	The whole act.
20 Geo. 3. c. 70	Gloucester Roads Act 1780	The whole act.
20 Geo. 3. c. 76	Burford to Preston Road Act 1780	The whole act.
21 Geo. 3. c. 87	Oxford Roads Act 1781	The whole act.
23 Geo. 3. c. 104	Gloucester Roads Act 1783	The whole act.
23 Geo. 3. c. 106	Gloucestershire Roads Act 1783	The whole act.
30 Geo. 3. c. 106	Berks Roads Act 1790	The whole act.
31 Geo. 3. c. 103	Bicester to Aynho Road Act 1791	The whole act.
31 Geo. 3. c. 111	Oxford and Gloucester Roads Act 1791	The whole act.
31 Geo. 3. c. 116	Warwick and Gloucester Roads Act 1791	The whole act.
33 Geo. 3. c. 137	Witney to Clanfield Road Act 1793	The whole act.
33 Geo. 3. c. 180	Bicester Roads Act 1793	The whole act.
37 Geo. 3. c. 170	Adderbury and Oxford Road Act 1797	The whole act.
38 Geo. 3. c. xii	Gloucester, Cheltenham and Tewkesbury Roads Act 1798	The whole act.
38 Geo. 3. c. xiii	Crickley Hill, Campsfield and Kidlington Roads Act 1798	The whole act.
38 Geo. 3. c. lxv	Oxford District of Farringdon Road Act 1798	The whole act.
39 & 40 Geo. 3. c. xvi	Witney and Woodstock Roads Act 1800	The whole act.
39 & 40 Geo. 3. c. xcvi	Road from Gloucester to the Bristol Road Act 1800	The whole act.
41 Geo. 3. (U.K.) c. xvi	Road from Burford to Dancy's Fancy Act 1801	The whole act.
41 Geo. 3. (U.K.) c. lxxxv	Tetbury Roads Act 1801	The whole act.
41 Geo. 3. (U.K.) c. cxxxvii	Kidlington Green Road Act 1801	The whole act.
45 Geo. 3. c. cix	Road from Newnham to St. Whites (Gloucestershire) Act 1805	The whole act.
51 Geo. 3. c. xlvi	Abingdon and Swinford Road Act 1811	The whole act.
52 Geo. 3. c. xxvii	Cirencester Road Act 1812	The whole act.
53 Geo. 3. c. cxxxiii	Road from Neat Enstone and Chipping Norton Turnpike Road to Weston-on-the-Green (Oxfordshire) Act 1813	The whole act.
53 Geo. 3. c. cc	Bicester and Aynho Road and Branch Act 1813	The whole act.
55 Geo. 3. c. xxxviii	Witney and Clanfield Road Act 1815	The whole act.
56 Geo. 3. c. i	Chapel on the Heath (Oxfordshire) and Bourton on the Hill Road Act 1816	The whole act.
58 Geo. 3. c. v	Roads from Gloucester to Cheltenham Act 1818	The whole act.
58 Geo. 3. c. lxxii	Road from Chipping Campden to Old Stratford Act 1818	The whole act.
59 Geo. 3. c. lxxxiv	Roads from Fryer Bacon's Study (Oxford District) Act 1819	The whole act.
59 Geo. 3. c. cxxii	Adderbury and Oxford Road Act 1819	The whole act.
59 Geo. 3. c. cxxiv	Didbrook and Stow-on-the-Wold Road Act 1819	The whole act.
1 & 2 Geo. 4. c. vi	Gloucester and Clay Pitts Road Act 1821	The whole act.
1 & 2 Geo. 4. c. lxxxii	Gloucester to Bristol Road and Branches Act 1821	The whole act.
1 & 2 Geo. 4. c. lxxxiii	Roads from Tetbury, Frocester Hill and from Latterwood Act 1821	The whole act.
1 & 2 Geo. 4. c. lxxxvi	Weston-on-the-Green and Kidlington Road Act 1821	The whole act.
1 & 2 Geo. 4. c. cix	Crickley Hill and Campsfield Roads Act 1821	The whole act.
3 Geo. 4. c. xxxvi	Culham, Abingdon and Fyfield Roads Act 1822	The whole act.
3 Geo. 4. c. xlvii	Burford and Dancy's Fancy Road Act 1822	The whole act.
3 Geo. 4. c. lxi	Gloucestershire Roads Act 1822	The whole act.
3 Geo. 4. c. lxiii	Tetbury Roads Act 1822	The whole act.
3 Geo. 4. c. xc	Road from Banbury to Edgehill Act 1822	The whole act.
3 Geo. 4. c. xciii	Chippenham and Westerleigh Road Act 1822	The whole act.
4 Geo. 4. c. cv	Banbury, Brailes and Barcheston Road Act 1823	The whole act.
5 Geo. 4. c. ix	Burford Lane and Stow-on-the-Wold Roads Act 1824	The whole act.
5 Geo. 4. c. xi	Roads from Newent Act 1824	The whole act.
5 Geo. 4. c. cxl	Evesham and Cheltenham Turnpike Roads Act 1824	The whole act.
6 Geo. 4. c. clv	Warwick, Worcester, Gloucester and Oxford Roads Act 1825	The whole act.
7 Geo. 4. c. xii	Marshfield District of Roads Act 1826	The whole act.
7 Geo. 4. c. lxxviii	Tewkesbury Roads Act 1826	The whole act.
7 & 8 Geo. 4. c. xvi	Gloucester, Birdlip Hill and Crickley Hill Roads Act 1827	The whole act.
2 & 3 Will. 4. c. xxxiv	Buckingham to Hanwell (Oxfordshire) Road Act 1832	The whole act.
3 & 4 Will. 4. c. lv	Roads from Gloucester City Act 1833	The whole act.
3 & 4 Will. 4. c. lxxiii	Road from Great Faringdon to Burford Act 1833	The whole act.
3 & 4 Will. 4. c. xci	Fyfield and St. John's Bridge, and Kingston Bagpuize and Newbridge Roads Act 1833	The whole act.
4 & 5 Will. 4. c. xciv	Barrington and Campsfield and Enslow Bridge Roads (Oxfordshire) Act 1834	The whole act.
5 & 6 Will. 4. c. ciii	Oxford, Fifield and Witney Roads Act 1835	The whole act.
1 & 2 Vict. c. xlvi	Thame Roads Act 1838	The whole act.
4 & 5 Vict. c. c	Henleyupon-Thames, Dorchester and Oxford Road Act 1841	The whole act.
4 & 5 Vict. c. cvii	Nuffield and Faringdon Road Act 1841	The whole act.
4 & 5 Vict. c. cxi	Abingdon and Chilton Pond Road Act 1841	The whole act.
8 & 9 Vict. c. xxx	Stokenchurch and New Woodstock Road and Branches Act 1845	The whole act.
8 & 9 Vict. c. cli	Road from Harwell to Streatley (Berkshire) Act 1845	The whole act.
9 & 10 Vict. c. vii	Woodstock and Rollright Lane Road (Oxfordshire) Act 1846	The whole act.
14 & 15 Vict. c. xi	Cheltenham and Painswick Turnpike Road Act 1851	The whole act.
14 & 15 Vict. c. xii	Cheltenham and Gloucester Turnpike Road Act 1851	The whole act.
14 & 15 Vict. c. l	Stroud and Gloucester Turnpike Road Act 1851	The whole act.
15 & 16 Vict. c. lxxix	Shillingford, Wallingford and Reading Road Act 1852	The whole act.
15 & 16 Vict. c. lxxxvii	Stroud and Bisley Road Act 1852	The whole act.
15 & 16 Vict. c. cxxxix	Asthall and Buckland Road Act 1852	The whole act.
16 & 17 Vict. c. civ	Burford, Leachlade, and Swindon Turnpike Roads Act 1853	The whole act.
16 & 17 Vict. c. cxxvi	Upton Saint Leonard's Turnpike Roads Act 1853	The whole act.
17 & 18 Vict. c. xxi	Kingswood District of Roads Act 1854	The whole act.
17 & 18 Vict. c. xcv	Stroud, Painswick and Gloucester Road Act 1854	The whole act.
18 & 19 Vict. c. lxxxv	Charlbury Roads Act 1855	The whole act.
18 & 19 Vict. c. cvi	Lightpill and Birdlip Road Act 1855	The whole act.
18 & 19 Vict. c. cviii	Stroud, Cainscross and Minchinhampton Road Act 1855	The whole act.
18 & 19 Vict. c. cix	Stroud and Chalford Turnpike Roads Act 1855	The whole act.
21 & 22 Vict. c. lxxxvi	Dean Forest Turnpike Roads Act 1858	The whole act.
28 & 29 Vict. c. clxxi	Winchcomb Roads Act 1865	The whole act.
29 & 30 Vict. c. c	Huntley Roads Act 1866	The whole act.
51 & 52 Vict. c. cxciii	Forest of Dean Turnpike Trust Abolition Act 1888	The whole act.
Group 2 – Surrey
8 & 9 Will. 3. c. 15	Highways Surrey and Sussex Act 1696	The whole act.
4 Geo. 1. c. 4	London, East Grinstead, Sutton and Kingston Roads Act 1717	The whole act.
4 Geo. 1. c. 5	Southwark, Greenwich and Lewisham Roads Act 1717	The whole act.
6 Geo. 1. c. 26	Surrey and Kent Roads Act 1719	The whole act.
10 Geo. 1. c. 13	Surrey and Sussex Roads Act 1723	The whole act.
10 Geo. 2. c. 23	Surrey and Sussex Roads Act 1736	The whole act.
11 Geo. 2. c. 36	Surrey and Kent Roads Act 1737	The whole act.
25 Geo. 2. c. 51	South London Roads Act 1751	The whole act.
31 Geo. 2. c. 77	Leatherhead and Guildford Road Act 1757	The whole act.
31 Geo. 2. c. 78	Guildford and Farnham Road Act 1757	The whole act.
10 Geo. 3. c. 82	Surrey and Sussex Roads Act 1770	The whole act.
19 Geo. 3. c. 104	Surrey Roads Act 1779	The whole act.
20 Geo. 3. c. 96	Guildford to Farnham Road Act 1780	The whole act.
39 & 40 Geo. 3. c. xxvii	Leatherhead and Stoke (Surrey) Road Act 1800	The whole act.
41 Geo. 3. (U.K.) c. xliii	Guildford to Farnham Road Act 1801	The whole act.
55 Geo. 3. c. xlviii	Sutton (Surrey), Reigate and Povey Cross Road Act 1815	The whole act.
56 Geo. 3. c. xxx	Road from Gatton Lodge to Povey Cross (Surrey) Act 1816	The whole act.
3 Geo. 4. c. lxvii	Guildford to Farnham Road Act 1822	The whole act.
3 Geo. 4. c. xcvii	Road from Leatherhead to Stoke (Surrey) Act 1822	The whole act.
7 Geo. 4. c. xiii	Godalming and Pains Hill Road Act 1826	The whole act.
7 Geo. 4. c. lxxx	Farnham and Petersfield Turnpike Road Act 1826	The whole act.
10 Geo. 4. c. xx	Wrotham Heath and Croydon and Godstone Road Act 1829	The whole act.
10 Geo. 4. c. lxiv	Guildford and Alfold Bars Road Act 1829	The whole act.
11 Geo. 4 & 1 Will. 4. c. vi	Road from Horsham Act 1830	The whole act.
1 Will. 4. c. v	Hounslow Heath and Egham Hill Road Act 1831	The whole act.
1 Will. 4. c. xxviii	Milford and Haslemere Road Act 1831	The whole act.
1 Will. 4. c. xlii	Horley Common, Black Corner and Cuckfield Road Act 1831	The whole act.
3 & 4 Will. 4. c. xxxviii	Egham Hill and Bagshot Road Act 1833	The whole act.
3 & 4 Will. 4. c. liii	Ockley and Warnham Road Act 1833	The whole act.
13 & 14 Vict. c. xlix	Croydon and Reigate Turnpike Road Act 1850	The whole act.
13 & 14 Vict. c. lxxxiv	Godstone and Highgate Turnpike Trust Liquidation of Debt Act 1850	The whole act.
13 & 14 Vict. c. lxxxv	Surrey and Sussex Roads Act 1850	The whole act.
15 & 16 Vict. c. xcii	Bramley and Ridgewick Turnpike Road Act 1852	The whole act.
17 & 18 Vict. c. lxxi	Petworth Turnpike Roads Act 1854	The whole act.
21 & 22 Vict. c. xlix	Horsham and Dorking Turnpike Road Act 1858	The whole act.
24 & 25 Vict. c. xxvii	Kingston and Leatherhead Turnpike Road Act 1861	The whole act.
Group 3 – London to Holyhead
(1) Finance
55 Geo. 3. c. 152	Holyhead Roads Act 1815	The whole act.
1 Geo. 4. c. 70	Roads (London to Chirk) Act 1820	The whole act.
1 & 2 Geo. 4. c. 30	Holyhead Roads Act 1821	The whole act.
6 Geo. 4. c. 100	Holyhead Road Act 1825	The whole act.
7 Geo. 4. c. 76	Holyhead Bridges and Roads Act 1826	The whole act.
7 & 8 Geo. 4. c. 35	London and Holyhead and Liverpool Roads Act 1827	The whole act.
9 Geo. 4. c. 75	Holyhead Roads Act 1828	The whole act.
11 Geo. 4 & 1 Will. 4. c. 67	Holyhead, Liverpool Roads Act 1830	The whole act.
4 & 5 Will. 4. c. 66	Menai and Conway Bridges Act 1834	The whole act.
5 & 6 Will. 4. c. 21	Shrewsbury to Bangor Road Act 1835	The whole act.
6 & 7 Will. 4. c. 35	London and Holyhead Road Act 1836	The whole act.
24 & 25 Vict. c. 28	Holyhead Road Relief Act 1861	The whole act.
47 & 48 Vict. c. xxi	Highgate Archway Act 1884	The whole act.
(2) Turnpike
15 Geo. 3. c. 73	Old Stratford to Dunchurch Road Act 1775	The whole act.
18 Geo. 3. c. 88	Salop Roads Act 1778	The whole act.
32 Geo. 3. c. 159	Dunstable to Hockliffe Road Act 1792	The whole act.
36 Geo. 3. c. 141	Old Stratford and Dunchurch Road Act 1796	The whole act.
39 Geo. 3. c. xvi	Watling Street Turnpike Road Act 1799	The whole act.
48 Geo. 3. c. lxv	Watling Street Road Act 1808	The whole act.
52 Geo. 3. c. lvii	Roads through Coventry Act 1812	The whole act.
54 Geo. 3. c. cxxi	Road from Dunstable to Hockliffe Act 1814	The whole act.
54 Geo. 3. c. cxxvi	Old Stratford and Dunchurch Road Act 1814	The whole act.
60 Geo. 3 & 1 Geo. 4. c. v	Buildwas Bridge and Tern Bridge Road Act 1820	The whole act.
1 & 2 Geo. 4. c. cvii	Dunstable and Pondyards Road Act 1821	The whole act.
3 Geo. 4. c. xci	Old Stratford and Dunchurch Road Act 1822	The whole act.
6 Geo. 4. c. viii	Bridgnorth (Salop.) and Shiffnall Road Act 1825	The whole act.
6 Geo. 4. c. clxi	Shiffnall Roads Act 1825	The whole act.
7 & 8 Geo. 4. c. xv	Roads from Watling Street, Birches Brook and Ball's Hill (Salop.) Act 1827	The whole act.
10 Geo. 4. c. lxxiv	Watling Street Road (Shrewsbury District) Act 1829	The whole act.
11 Geo. 4 & 1 Will. 4. c. lxxxiii	Hockliffe and Stony Stratford Road Act 1830	The whole act.
1 Will. 4. c. xiv	Watling Street, and Mancester (Warwickshire) and Wolvey Heath Road Act 1831	The whole act.
1 & 2 Will. 4. c. lxiii	Aylesbury and Hockliffe Road Act 1831	The whole act.
2 & 3 Will. 4. c. iv	Road from Hardingston to Old Stratford (Northamptonshire) Act 1832	The whole act.
3 & 4 Will. 4. c. xcix	Watling Street (Shrewsbury and Wellington Districts) Act 1833	The whole act.

=== Other ===
- a provision of Scots law relating to capital punishment, moot since its abolition following the Crime and Disorder Act 1998

== Further developments ==
In its 2016-17 report the Law Commission said that future statute law repeals work would narrow its focus to dead law which misleads the broadest range of individuals relying on the statute book in whatever capacity.
