= Ruthin and Cerrig-y-Drudion Railway =

Closed railway line in Wales

Ruthin and Cerrig-y-druidion Railway Act 1876
- Act of Parliament
- Parliament of the United Kingdom
- Long title: An Act for making a Railway from Ruthin to Cerrig-y-druidion, in the County of Denbigh.
- Citation: 39 & 40 Vict. c. lxxxi
- Territorial extent: United Kingdom

Dates
- Royal assent: 27 June 1876
- Commencement: 27 June 1876 (Note: The Acts of Parliament (Commencement) Act 1793.)
- Repealed: 31 January 2013

Other legislation
- Repealed by: Statute Law (Repeals) Act 2013

Status: Repealed

Ruthin and Cerrig-y-druidion Railway (Abandonment) Act 1884
- Act of Parliament
- Parliament of the United Kingdom
- Long title: An Act for the abandonment of the Ruthin and Cerrig-y-druidion Railway and for other purposes.
- Citation: 47 & 48 Vict. c. lxx
- Territorial extent: United Kingdom

Dates
- Royal assent: 23 June 1884
- Commencement: 23 June 1884
- Repealed: 31 January 2013

Other legislation
- Repealed by: Statute Law (Repeals) Act 2013

Status: Repealed

The Ruthin and Cerrig-y-Drudion Railway was a proposed 1 ft 11 1/2 in (597 mm) narrow gauge railway that would have linked the towns of Ruthin and Cerrig-y-Drudion in Denbighshire, Wales. A bill was put before Parliament in 1873, promoting the railway, which was intended to meet the planned branch of the North Wales Narrow Gauge Railways from Beddgelert at Cerrig-y-Drudion.

Although the bill was withdrawn, a second bill was successfully passed in June 1876, becoming the Ruthin and Cerrig-y-druidion Railway Act 1876 (39 & 40 Vict. c. lxxxi). Some construction work started in 1879, but was abandoned in 1884. The route can be traced for about 8 km (5.0 mi) from Ruthin LNWR station to Cefn-yr-iwrch farm between Bontuchel and Cyffylliog.
