= Edmund Wragge =

British-born railway engineer

Edmund Wragge MICE
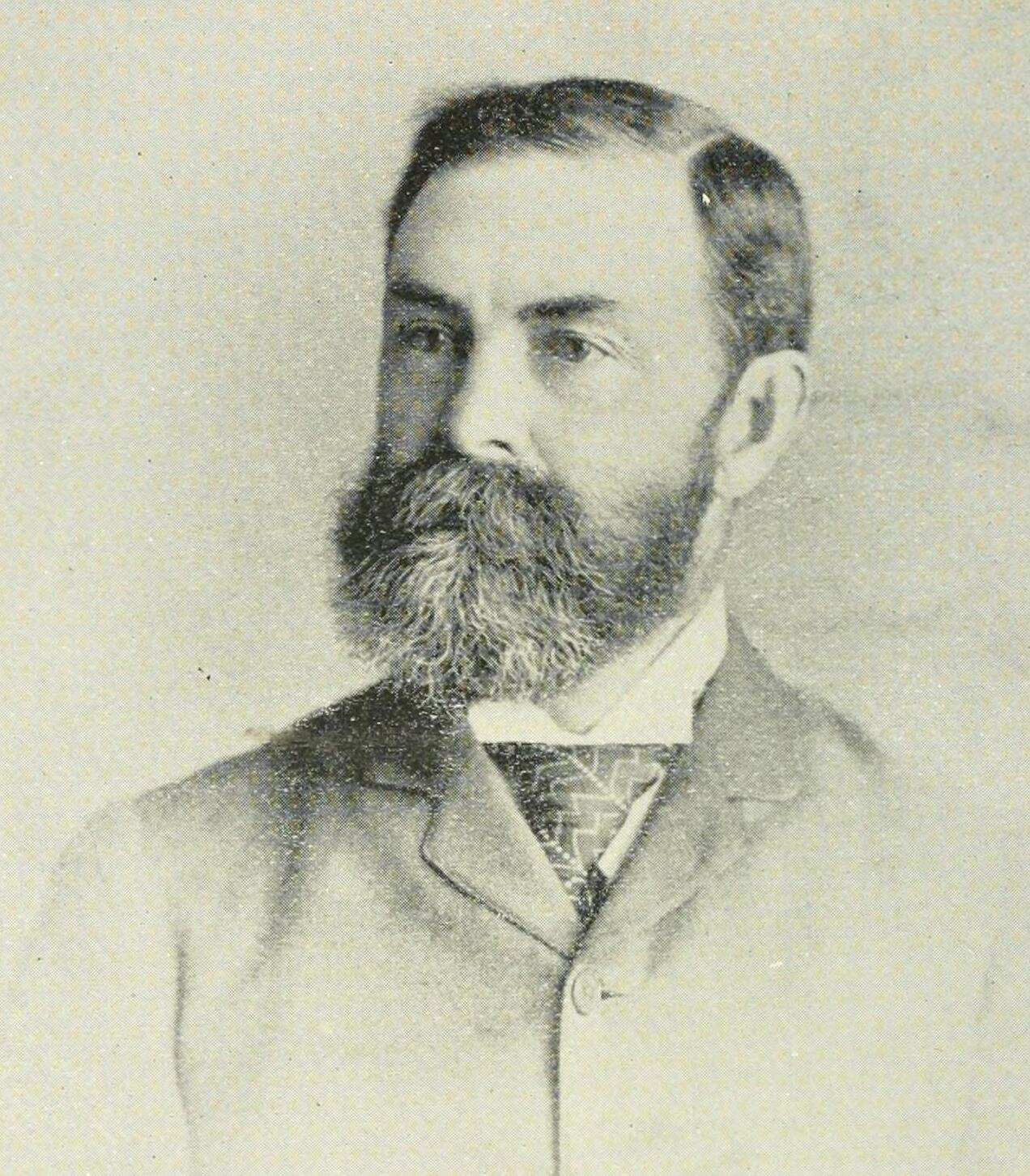
- Born: 1837
- Died: 26 November 1929 (aged 91–92); Toronto
- Occupation: Railway civil engineer

Signature
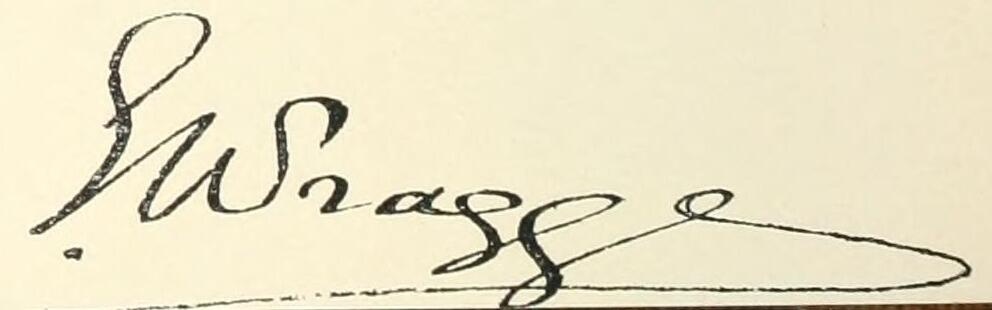

Edmund Wragge MICE (1837 – 26 November 1929) was a British-born and trained engineer who constructed the first common-carrier narrow gauge railways in North America. He was invited back to Britain in 1897 to engineer the difficult approaches of the Great Central Railway to a new terminus at London (Marylebone).

== Origins ==
Edmund Wragge was the second son of seven children born to Charles John and Frances Anne Wragge of Red Hill House, Old Swinford, near Stourbridge, Worcestershire. Wragge's parents were cousins, married at Oakamoor, Cheadle, Staffordshire. Their families were prosperous lawyers and bankers in the English Midlands, although with engineering and manufacturing connections. Ingleby & Wragge, Solicitors of New Street, Birmingham, handled some of the legal business of Boulton and Watt. The Worcestershire Wragges were lawyers and bankers. Charles John Wragge was an attorney who in 1835 became a partner in Rufford's Bank, Stourbridge with Francis Rufford, a railway financier, member of parliament, and speculator. In 1851 the bank suffered a liquidity crisis as a result of Rufford's speculations, and failed. All the assets were sold in 1852, including Red Hill House.

Wragge was educated at Rossall School on the Lancashire coast. When he was seventeen, in about 1853, he commenced his engineering career as a pupil with Messrs. Fox, Henderson and Company, London Works, Smethwick. John Henderson, the Scottish-born ironmaster, is said to have been a friend of Wragge's father. After the partnership between Fox and Henderson was wound up in the mid-1850s Wragge completed his pupilage in London with Sir Charles Fox and Son, until he was about twenty-two years of age in 1858. A position with Fox, the celebrated engineer of the Crystal Palace housing the Great Exhibition of 1851, would have required payment of a substantial premium.

== Career ==
=== South Africa ===
In 1859 Wragge went to Cape Colony where he remained for three and a half years as a district engineer on the construction of the Cape Town and Wellington Railway. The consultant engineer of the proposed line was Sir Charles Fox, who had submitted an estimated cost of £500,000 in 1851. The line was built by the Cape Town Railway and Dock Company, which was incorporated in London in 1853, with a concession to build a line from Cape Town to Wellington.

=== England ===
Wragge then returned to England with his wife, and for a year (1862–63) he was an assistant engineer on the London, Chatham and Dover Railway. Then for the three years between 1863 and 1866, he became resident engineer in charge of the reconstruction of the approaches from Battersea to Victoria Station, for the London Chatham & Dover, the London Brighton & South Coast, and the London & South Western Railways. Sir Charles Fox & Sons engineered this complex scheme of high level lines at Battersea, and the widening of the railway bridge over the Thames.

During this period he prepared a proposal (one of several between 1850 and 1900), for a light railway in the Rother Valley of Sussex. Plans and documents developed by Sir Charles Fox and Edmund Wragge were deposited on 30 November 1865.

In 1866 Wragge went into practice on his own account for three years, during which time he was resident engineer on the works of the Waterloo & Whitehall Railway. This was to have been a short pneumatic tube railway in a 12 ft 9 in diameter cast iron tube under the River Thames, driven by an atmospheric engine. The line obtained an enabling act in 1865.

=== Costa Rica ===
His relationship with Sir Charles continued when Fox asked him to go to Costa Rica in December 1868, to make a survey for a narrow gauge railway across the country from the Atlantic to the Pacific Coast.

=== Membership of the Institution of Civil Engineers ===
In 1869 Wragge applied for membership of the Institution of Civil Engineers, which was granted in January 1870. He was sponsored by Sir Charles Fox, and his candidate circular provides not only details of his career, but also an insight into Wragge's lengthy list of seconders from the railway industry, including some distinguished proponents of the narrow gauge such as Sir Henry Whatley Tyler, HM's chief inspector of railways.

=== Canada ===
On his return from Costa Rica, Wragge's letters indicate that he worked on a project in the English Midlands for some months until Sir Charles Fox secured for him the position of chief engineer of the Toronto, Grey and Bruce Railway (TG&BR), and the Toronto and Nipissing Railway (T&NR) in July 1869.

At the first National Narrow Gauge Convention, in St. Louis, in June 1872, Wragge was asked to speak on his experiences, and was appointed to the central executive committee. Wragge's railways were technically innovative in their motive power, using large ‘Fairlie’ articulated types for freight haulage; and purchasing numbers of powerful and successful British 4-6-0 types, 24 years before such locomotives were first accepted in Britain (on the Highland Railway in 1894). Wragge described the railways in two technical papers, written for the Institution of Civil Engineers.

In 1875, he gave up his position with the T&NR in order to become the general manager of the TG&BR, and the respect he had earned is reflected publicly in the minutes of the T&NR Annual General Meeting of that year. At the TG&BR, Wragge oversaw the gauge conversion of the line to standard gauge. Wragge was appointed Toronto area manager for the Grand Trunk Railway (GTR) on 8 October 1883, by the general manager, Joseph Hickson. In 1891 Wragge was elected as vice president of the Ontario and Sault Ste Marie Railway.

Wragge returned occasionally to Britain during this period and a letter in his 1883 correspondence indicates that he was working there with Sir Charles Fox and Sons on negotiations for the building of the Quebec North Shore Railway. Sir William Cornelius Van Horne, the president of the Canadian Pacific Railway (CPR) asked Wragge in 1888 to act as an arbitrator in compensation negotiations between the CPR and the Canadian government.

=== Return to England ===
His work on the rebuilding of Union Station and continued association with Douglas Fox led to his return to Britain, at the age of 60, in 1896, to participate in the building of the last main line into Central London, that of the Great Central Railway. Construction of this heavily engineered connection commenced in late 1894, of which the most difficult part was to drive a mainline railway through the London suburbs to a terminus at Marylebone. This was the section for which Sir Charles Fox and Sons were the consultants. Edmund Wragge was the resident engineer from 1897 to 1899 and lived in the St Marylebone district, close to the construction works. The completion of the line in March 1899, was marked by the presentation of several technical papers to the Institution of Civil Engineers. G. A. Hobson and Edmund Wragge gave a lengthy and detailed paper in November 1900, describing the engineering and construction of the approaches to Marylebone Station. The Institution of Civil Engineers awarded Wragge and Hobson the Telford Medal and premiums for this work.

== Death ==
Edmund Wragge returned to Canada in 1904, and was in private practice until he retired in 1914. He died in Toronto, on 26 November 1929, aged 93.
