= Waterloo and Whitehall Railway =

1860s partly constructed pneumatic railway in London, England

Coordinates: 51°30′21.75″N 0°7′35.88″W

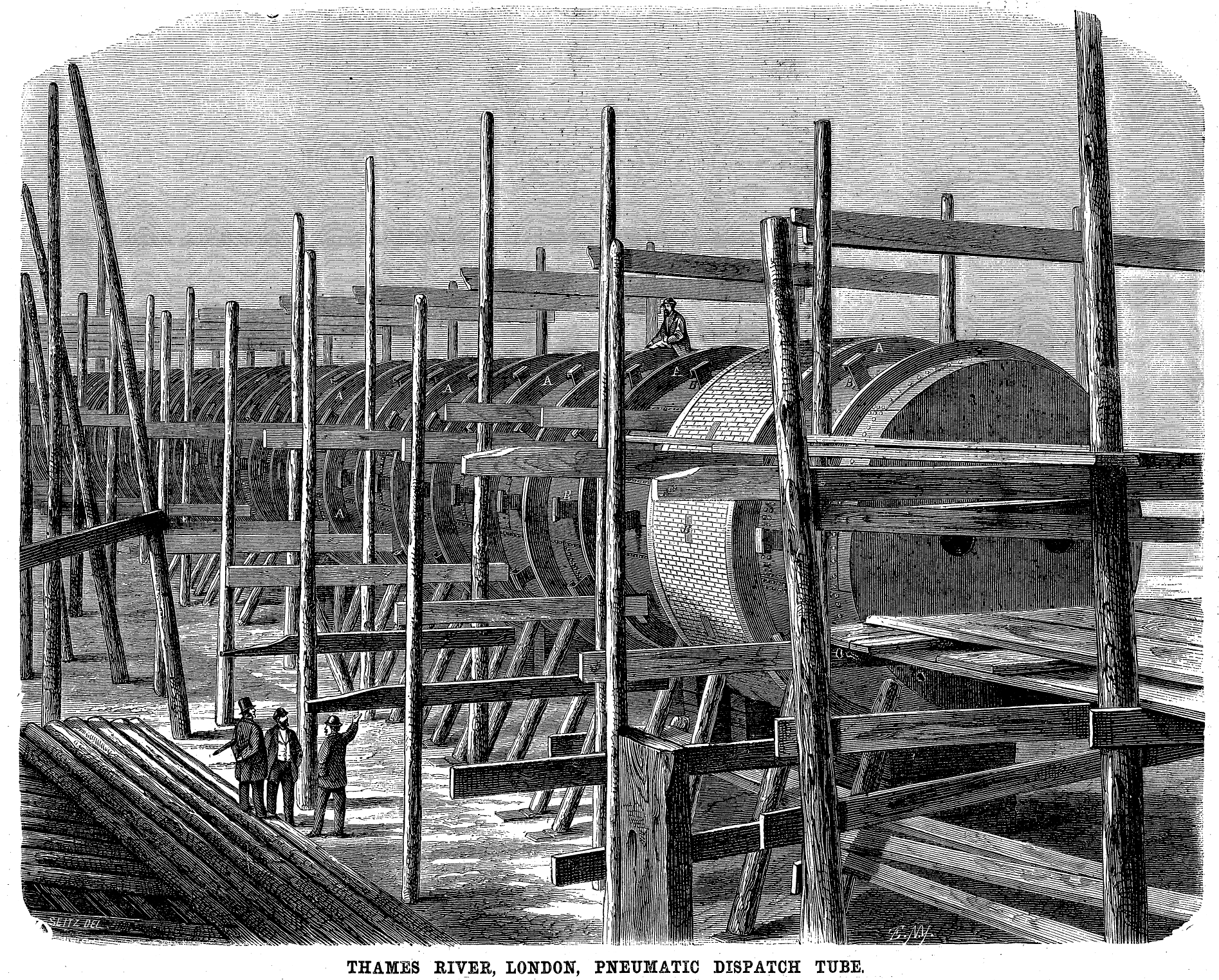
- Illustration of the iron tube intended for use on the railway.

Overview
- Locale: London, England
- Dates of operation: 1865–1867

Technical
- Track gauge: Unknown

The Waterloo and Whitehall Railway was a proposed and partly constructed 19th-century Rammell pneumatic railway in central London. It was intended to run under the River Thames just upstream from Hungerford Bridge, connecting Waterloo station to the Whitehall end of Great Scotland Yard. The later Baker Street and Waterloo Railway followed a similar alignment for part of its route.

== Origins ==
Waterloo and Whitehall Railway Act 1865 (Note: Section 1.)
- Act of Parliament
- Parliament of the United Kingdom
- Long title: An Act for making a Railway from near the Waterloo Station of the London and South-Western Railway to Whitehall; and for other Purposes.
- Citation: 28 & 29 Vict. c. cclviii
- Territorial extent: United Kingdom

Dates
- Royal assent: 5 July 1865
- Commencement: 5 July 1865 (Note: The Acts of Parliament (Commencement) Act 1793.)
- Repealed: 31 January 2013

Other legislation
- Repealed by: Statute Law (Repeals) Act 2013

Status: Repealed

Text of statute as originally enacted

The Waterloo and Whitehall Railway Act 1865 (28 & 29 Vict. c. cclviii) was an act of the Parliament of the United Kingdom that authorized the construction of a pneumatic railway under the River Thames in central London. The proposed route was:

A Railway commencing in the Parish of St Martin's-in-the-Fields in the County of Middlesex in the Street or Place known as Great Scotland Yard at or near the Western End thereof, and terminating in the Parish of Lambeth and County of Surrey in a Piece of Land belonging to the London and South-western Railway Company, and in the Occupation of Edwin Benjamin Gammon, near to and opposite the Arches under the Waterloo Station of that Railway numbered respectively 249 and 250.

The project was later extended by the Waterloo and Whitehall Railway (Amendment) Act 1867 (30 & 31 Vict. c. cxcvii), which enlarged the powers of the railway company, and the Waterloo and Whitehall Railway Act 1868 (31 & 32 Vict. c. clxix), which further extended the period for construction.

Waterloo and Whitehall Railway (Amendment) Act 1867
- Act of Parliament
- Parliament of the United Kingdom
- Long title: An Act to enlarge the Powers of the Waterloo and Whitehall Railway Company.
- Citation: 30 & 31 Vict. c. cxcvii
- Territorial extent: United Kingdom

Dates
- Royal assent: 12 August 1867
- Commencement: 12 August 1867
- Repealed: 31 January 2013

Other legislation
- Repealed by: Statute Law (Repeals) Act 2013

Status: Repealed

Text of statute as originally enacted

Waterloo and Whitehall Railway Act 1868
- Act of Parliament
- Parliament of the United Kingdom
- Long title: An Act to further extend the time for completing the works of the Waterloo and Whitehall Railway.
- Citation: 31 & 32 Vict. c. clxix
- Territorial extent: United Kingdom

Dates
- Royal assent: 31 July 1868
- Commencement: 31 July 1868
- Repealed: 31 January 2013

Other legislation
- Repealed by: Statute Law (Repeals) Act 2013

Status: Repealed

The Waterloo and Whitehall Railway (Amendment) Act 1867 and the Waterloo and Whitehall Railway Act 1868 extended the period for completing the railway and granted additional powers to the railway company. Both Acts were eventually repealed by the Statute Law (Repeals) Act 2013.

== Technical information ==
The pneumatic pressure was designed to be 22 lb/sq ft (1,100 Pa; 0.010 atm) in a 12-foot (3.7 m) diameter tube, with the engine at the Waterloo end both sucking and blowing 25-seat carriages, which acted as pistons within the tube. Edmund Wragge served as the resident engineer.

The railway was intended to cross the River Thames through a tunnel composed of four prefabricated tube sections, each 220 feet (67 m) long, laid in a trench dredged across the riverbed. These sections were to be joined by inserting their ends into junction chambers constructed within brick piers below the existing riverbed. The piers were also designed to bear the weight of the sections, which were made of three-quarter-inch boiler plate, encased by four rings of brickwork, firmly secured with cement and flanged rings riveted to the metal. Each section, at least one of which was completed, weighed nearly 1,000 tons. Prefabrication began at the Samuda Brothers shipyard in Poplar, five miles downstream. If completed, this railway would have been the first underground railway of its kind.

== Decline and abandonment ==
The line was affected by the 1866 financial crisis, which was triggered by the collapse of the Overend, Gurney and Company bank. On 2 September 1870, the Board of Trade invoked the Abandonment of Railways Act 1850 (13 & 14 Vict. c. 83) and the Railway Companies Act 1867 (30 & 31 Vict. c. 127) to declare that the railway should be abandoned by the company.

== Further developments ==
Another railway, the Charing Cross and Waterloo Electric Railway, was incorporated by the Charing Cross and Waterloo Electric Railway Act 1882 (45 & 46 Vict. c. cclv), but it was abandoned by the Charing Cross and Waterloo Electric Railway (Abandonment) Act 1885 (48 & 49 Vict. c. lxxi) on 16 July 1885. A third company, the Baker Street and Waterloo Railway, secured the Baker Street and Waterloo Railway Act 1893 (56 & 57 Vict. c. iv). Although this project was also initially put on hold, it eventually became the Bakerloo line.

== Remains ==
Some parts of the works remained, and at certain points, tubes were still present at the bottom of the Thames. Additionally, piles were observed protruding from the river. The trench excavated at the northern end is said to have become the wine cellar of the National Liberal Club. Some remnants of the works were also discovered during the construction of the Shell Centre on the South Bank.
