= Charing Cross and Waterloo Electric Railway =

British railway company

Charing Cross and Waterloo Electric Railway Act 1882 (Note: Section 1.)
- Act of Parliament
- Parliament of the United Kingdom
- Long title: An Act for making a Railway from Charing Cross to the Waterloo Station of the London and South-western Railway to be called the Charing Cross and Waterloo Electric Railway and for other purposes.
- Citation: 45 & 46 Vict. c. cclv
- Territorial extent: United Kingdom

Dates
- Royal assent: 18 August 1882
- Commencement: 18 August 1882 (Note: The Acts of Parliament (Commencement) Act 1793.)

Other legislation
- Repealed by: Charing Cross and Waterloo Electric Railway (Abandonment) Act 1885

Status: Repealed

Text of statute as originally enacted

The Charing Cross and Waterloo Electric Railway (CC&WER) was a railway company established in 1881 to construct an underground railway in London. The CC&WER proposed a line between a station under Trafalgar Square and the London and South Western Railway's terminus at Waterloo. The plan was similar in concept to that proposed by the Waterloo and Whitehall Railway in 1864 which could not raise funds due to a banking crisis. To form the tunnels under the River Thames, iron pipes would be sunk into a trench dredged in the river bed.

The CC&WER was the first to propose electric traction for its trains and was supported by Sir William Siemens. (Note: Siemens was born in Germany and came to Britain in 1843 before become a British citizen in 1859.) His brother, Werner von Siemens, had demonstrated the first electric railway in Berlin in 1879 and their electrical engineering company Siemens Brothers was to provide the electrical equipment and operate the line for the first five years.

Permission to construct the line was granted by Parliament on 18 August 1882 in the Charing Cross and Waterloo Electric Railway Act 1882 (45 & 46 Vict. c. cclv) and a proposal was submitted in December 1882 to continue the line from Waterloo to Blackfriars and the Royal Exchange in the City of London. The extension was opposed by the Metropolitan Board of Works, but difficulties in raising funds to construct the line due to the novelty of its method of traction, led to the extension bill being withdrawn in May 1883.

Charing Cross and Waterloo Electric Railway (Abandonment) Act 1885
- Act of Parliament
- Parliament of the United Kingdom
- Long title: An Act for the abandonment of the Railway authorised by the Charing Cross and Waterloo Electric Railway Act 1882 and for other purposes.
- Citation: 48 & 49 Vict. c. lxxi
- Territorial extent: United Kingdom

Dates
- Royal assent: 16 July 1885
- Commencement: 16 July 1885
- Repealed: 31 January 2013

Other legislation
- Repeals/revokes: Charing Cross and Waterloo Electric Railway Act 1882
- Repealed by: Statute Law (Repeals) Act 2013

Status: Repealed

Text of statute as originally enacted

William Siemens died in November 1883, and the company was abandoned in July 1885 by the Charing Cross and Waterloo Electric Railway (Abandonment) Act 1885 (48 & 49 Vict. c. lxxi).

== Bibliography ==
- Badsey-Ellis, Antony (2005). London's Lost Tube Schemes. Capital Transport. ISBN 978-185414-293-1.
