= Catch22 (charity) =

Not for profit business with a social mission

- Merged into: Ripplez, Community Links
- Formation: 1788
- Merger of: Rainer (merged by The Philanthropic Society and Rainer Foundation (formerly London Police Court Mission (LPCM)) and Crime Concern
- Headquarters: 27 Pear Tree Street, London, EC1V 3AG
- Chief Executive Officer: Naomi Hulston
- Deputy Chief Executive: Nigel Richards
- Chief People Officer: Christina Duru
- Chief Development Officer: Andy Canniford
- Key people: Caroline Artis, Interim Chair; Princess Royal, Patron
- Subsidiaries: Lighthouse Pedagogy Trust
- Staff: 1,000 staff and volunteers
- Website: https://www.catch-22.org.uk/
- Formerly called: The Philanthropic Society

Catch22 is a not-for-profit social business operating in the United Kingdom (England and Wales). It was formed in 2008 by the merge of UK young people's organisations Rainer and Crime Concern.

== Scope ==
Amongst other services, Catch22 provides alternative education, apprenticeships and employability programmes, justice and rehabilitation services (in prisons and in the community), gangs intervention work, emotional wellbeing and substance misuse, and children's social care programmes.

Catch22's chief executive is Naomi Hulston, who replaced the prior executive Chris Wright in mid 2022. Hulston was joined by Chief Operating Officer Dan McCormack to complete her executive team in August 2023. HRH Princess Anne is patron of the organisation.

The organisation's current name is inspired by the eponymous novel, and took place in 2008 after the merger of the charities Rainer and Crime Concern.

== History ==
=== Royal Philanthropic Society ===
The Royal Philanthropic Society had its origins in the St Paul's Coffee House in London in 1788, where a group of men met to discuss the problems of homeless children who were to be found begging and stealing on the streets. The Society began by opening homes where children in need and young offenders were trained in cottage industries working under the instruction of skilled tradesmen. This was one of the first attempts in the United Kingdom to separate the treatment of young offenders from the adult population. In 1806 the Society was incorporated by Act of Parliament, sanctioning its work with juvenile delinquents. In 1823 it purchased the land in the parish of St George the Martyr, Southwark on which it had buildings and a chapel.

=== Rainer Foundation ===
The Rainer Foundation was originally formed as the London Police Court Mission (LPCM) as a result of a 5 shilling gift made by Fredric Rainer in 1876 to the Church of England Temperance Society (CETS), part of the Temperance movement. In the letter attached to the gift Rainer asked "can nothing be done for him whose foot has once slipped". In response, the CETS appointed a missionary to Southwark court, who became the basis for the LPCM. In 1907 under the aegis of the Probation of Offenders Act, these missionaries became known as probation officers.

=== Merger ===
The merger of the Royal Philanthropic Society and The Rainer Foundation took place in 1997 to form RPSRainer. In 2003 the business changed its name to Rainer.
