= Fulham Roads Act 1749 =

Act of the Parliament of Great Britain

- Act of Parliament
- Parliament of Great Britain
- Long title: An Act for enlarging the Term and Powers granted by an Act passed in the Fourth Year of the Reign of His present Majesty, for repairing the Road leading from the Town of Fulham, in the County of Middlesex, through Fulham Fields, to the great Road near the Pound at Hammersmith, in the said County.
- Citation: 23 Geo. 2. c. 10
- Territorial extent: Great Britain

Dates
- Royal assent: 14 March 1750
- Commencement: 16 November 1749 (Note: Start of session.)
- Expired: 19 May 1773 (Note: Section 1.)
- Repealed: 31 July 2013
Other legislation
| Amends | Fulham Roads Act 1730 |
| Repealed by | Statute Law (Repeals) Act 2013 |
| Relates to | Kensington, Chelsea and Fulham Roads (Tolls) Act 1725; Kensington, Chelsea and Fulham Roads (Toll Continuance) Act 1740 |

Status: Repealed

Text of statute as originally enacted

The Fulham Roads Act 1749 (23 Geo. 2. c. 10) was an act of the Parliament of Great Britain which extended for an additional 21 years the Fulham Roads Act 1730 (4 Geo. 2. c. 34) for the charging of tolls at turnpikes along specified roads in the parishes of Kensington, Chelsea and Fulham in the county of Middlesex.

The act became obsolete in May 1773 when the continuation of the Fulham Roads Act 1730 (4 Geo. 2. c. 34) came to an end. The act was repealed by the Statute Law (Repeals) Act 2013 which had been recommended by the Law Commission.

== Background ==
Prior to the late 19th century, Britain lacked a national framework for highway maintenance. The responsibility for road upkeep primarily fell on the local population through two main systems:

- Statute labour: for much of the 17th, 18th and 19th centuries, every able-bodied man to contribute six days of unpaid labour annually to repair local roads.
- Turnpikes: introduced in 1663, toll-gates placed across roads, requiring travellers to pay a fee for passage, with the collected revenue was then used for road repair and maintenance.

The Fulham Roads Act 1730 authorised the charging of tolls at turnpikes along the road leading from Fulham through Fulham Fields to the great road near the pound at Hammersmith that had become poorly maintained especially in winter, requiring repair.

The toll granted by the Fulham Roads Act 1730 (4 Geo. 2. c. 34) took place on 20 May 1731 for a term of 21 years, with authority to charge tolls to expire no later than 19 May 1752.

The Trustees appointed under the Fulham Roads Act 1730 (4 Geo. 2. c. 34) had borrowed £550 for the purpose of repairing the road, however, “such Road is at present far from being sufficiently repaired; nor can the same be effectually amended, and kept in repair, for the future, or the aforesaid Debt of Five hundred and fifty Pounds be paid off, unless the said Term granted by the [1730 Act], and the Powers given thereby, be enlarged”.

== Provisions ==
The act provided:

- The Fulham Roads Act 1730 (4 Geo. 2. c. 34) (and the powers it contained) was to continue for a further 21 years from the expiry of the term granted by that act i.e. 21 years from 20 May 1752.
- The tolls chargeable under this extended term were to cease before the end of the term (i.e. before 20 May 1773) in the event of the Road being repaired and the £550 debt repaid before then.
- Expenses and status of the Act.

== Repeal ==
The 19th Statute Law Repeals Report of the Law Commission recommend repealing the act, as well as the Fulham Roads Act 1730 (4 Geo. 2. c. 34):

"Under the terms of the 1749 Act, both Acts were to expire on or before May 1773. It follows that neither Act has served any useful purpose for about 240 years, and their formal repeal is now proposed on that basis."

The whole act was repealed by section 1 of, and the group 2 of part 6 of the schedule to, the Statute Law (Repeals) Act 2013, which came into force on 31 January 2013.
