= List of acts of the Parliament of Great Britain from 1750 =

This is a complete list of acts of the Parliament of Great Britain for the year 1750.

For acts passed until 1707, see the list of acts of the Parliament of England and the list of acts of the Parliament of Scotland. See also the list of acts of the Parliament of Ireland.

For acts passed from 1801 onwards, see the list of acts of the Parliament of the United Kingdom. For acts of the devolved parliaments and assemblies in the United Kingdom, see the list of acts of the Scottish Parliament, the list of acts of the Northern Ireland Assembly, and the list of acts and measures of Senedd Cymru; see also the list of acts of the Parliament of Northern Ireland.

The number shown after each act's title is its chapter number. Acts are cited using this number, preceded by the year(s) of the reign during which the relevant parliamentary session was held; thus the Union with Ireland Act 1800 is cited as "39 & 40 Geo. 3. c. 67", meaning the 67th act passed during the session that started in the 39th year of the reign of George III and which finished in the 40th year of that reign. Note that the modern convention is to use Arabic numerals in citations (thus "41 Geo. 3" rather than "41 Geo. III"). Acts of the last session of the Parliament of Great Britain and the first session of the Parliament of the United Kingdom are both cited as "41 Geo. 3".

Acts passed by the Parliament of Great Britain did not have a short title; however, some of these acts have subsequently been given a short title by acts of the Parliament of the United Kingdom (such as the Short Titles Act 1896).

Before the Acts of Parliament (Commencement) Act 1793 came into force on 8 April 1793, acts passed by the Parliament of Great Britain were deemed to have come into effect on the first day of the session in which they were passed. Because of this, the years given in the list below may in fact be the year before a particular act was passed.

== 24 Geo. 2 ==
The fourth session of the 10th Parliament of Great Britain, which met from 17 January 1751 until 25 June 1751.

This session was also traditionally cited as 24 G. 2.

=== Public acts ===
Short title	Citation	Royal assent
Long title
Taxation Act 1750 (repealed)	24 Geo. 2. c. 1	12 March 1751
An Act for continuing and granting to His Majesty certain Duties upon Malt, Mum, Cyder, and Perry, for the Service of the Year One Thousand Seven Hundred and Fifty-one. (Repealed by Statute Law Revision Act 1867 (30 & 31 Vict. c. 59))
National Debt Act 1750 (repealed)	24 Geo. 2. c. 2	12 March 1751
An Act for granting to His Majesty the Sum of Two Millions One Hundred Thousand Pounds, to be raised by Annuities and a Lottery, and charged on the Sinking Fund, redeemable by Parliament. (Repealed by Statute Law Revision Act 1870 (33 & 34 Vict. c. 69))
Stamford and Grantham Road Act 1750 (repealed)	24 Geo. 2. c. 3	12 March 1751
An Act for enlarging the Term and Powers granted by an Act passed in the Twelfth Year of the Reign of His present Majesty, (Note: Stamford and Grantham Road Act 1738 (12 Geo. 2. c. 8)) for repairing the Road between Stamford and Grantham, in the County of Lincoln, and for making the same more effectual. (Repealed by Road from Foston Bridge (Lincolnshire) Act 1808 (48 Geo. 3. c. lxiii))
Bank of England Act 1750 (repealed)	24 Geo. 2. c. 4	22 March 1751
An Act for enabling His Majesty to raise the several Sums of Money therein mentioned, by Exchequer Bills, to be charged on the Sinking Fund, and for empowering the Commissioners of the Treasury to pay off the Old and New unsubscribed South Sea Annuities, out of the Supply granted to His Majesty for the Service of the Year One Thousand Seven Hundred and Fifty-one, and for enabling the Bank of England to hold General Courts and Courts of Directors, in the Manner therein directed, and for giving certain Persons Liberty to subscribe Bank and South Sea Annuities omitted to be subscribed pursuant to Two Acts of the last Session of Parliament. (Note: National Debt Act 1749 (23 Geo. 2. c. 16)) (Note: National Debt (No. 2) Act 1749 (23 Geo. 2. c. 22)) (Repealed by Statute Law Revision Act 1870 (33 & 34 Vict. c. 69), Statute Law Revision Act 1887 (50 & 51 Vict. c. 59) and Bank Act 1892 (55 & 56 Vict. c. 48))
Indemnity Act 1750 (repealed)	24 Geo. 2. c. 5	22 March 1751
An Act to indemnify Persons who have omitted to qualify themselves for Offices and Employments within the Time limited by Law, and for allowing further Time for that Purpose. (Repealed by Statute Law Revision Act 1867 (30 & 31 Vict. c. 59))
Mutiny Act 1750 (repealed)	24 Geo. 2. c. 6	22 March 1751
An Act for punishing Mutiny and Desertion, and for the better Payment of the Army and their Quarters. (Repealed by Statute Law Revision Act 1867 (30 & 31 Vict. c. 59))
Land Tax Act 1750 (repealed)	24 Geo. 2. c. 7	22 March 1751
An Act for granting an Aid to His Majesty, by a Land Tax, to be raised in Great Britain, for the Service of the Year One Thousand Seven Hundred and Fifty-one. (Repealed by Statute Law Revision Act 1867 (30 & 31 Vict. c. 59))
Thames and Isis Navigation Act 1750 or the Thames Navigation Act 1750 (repealed)	24 Geo. 2. c. 8	22 March 1751
An Act for the better carrying on and regulating the Navigation of the Rivers Thames and Isis, from the City of London Westward, to the Town of Cricklade, in the County of Wilts. (Repealed by Thames Conservancy Act 1894 (57 & 58 Vict. c. clxxxvii))
Wiltshire Roads Act 1750	24 Geo. 2. c. 9	22 March 1751
An Act for repairing the Road leading from West Lavington to The Devizes, and from The Devizes to Seend, in the County of Wilts.
Hertfordshire and Middlesex Roads Act 1750 (repealed)	24 Geo. 2. c. 10	22 March 1751
An Act for enlarging the Term and Powers granted by Two Acts of Parliament, (Note: Hertford and Middlesex Highways Act 1715 (1 Geo. 1. St. 2. c. 12 Pr.)) (Note: Hertfordshire and Middlesex Roads Act 1734 (8 Geo. 2. c. 9)) for repairing the Highways, through the several Parishes of St. Michael, St. Alban, St. Peter, Shenley Ridge, and South Mims, in the Counties of Hertford and Middlesex. (Repealed by Hertford and Middlesex Roads Act 1791 (31 Geo. 3. c. 108))
National Debt (No. 2) Act 1750 (repealed)	24 Geo. 2. c. 11	22 May 1751
An Act for reducing the Interest upon the Capital Stock of the South Sea Company, from the Time, and upon the Terms, therein mentioned, and for preventing of Frauds committed by the Officers and Servants of the said Company. (Repealed by Statute Law Revision Act 1870 (33 & 34 Vict. c. 69))
Brandon and Waveney Navigation Act 1750	24 Geo. 2. c. 12	22 May 1751
An Act for appointing Commissioners to put in Execution an Act made in the Twenty-second Year of the Reign of King Charles the Second, (Note: Rivers Brandon and Waveney Navigation Act 1670 (22 Cha. 2. c. 16 Pr.)) for making navigable the Rivers commonly called Brandon and Waveney, so far as the same relates to the Navigation of the River commonly called The Lesser Ouze, from Thetford to Brandon, and from Brandon to a Place called The White House, near Brandon Ferry, in the Counties of Norfolk and Suffolk.
Crossford Bridge and Manchester Road Act 1750 (repealed)	24 Geo. 2. c. 13	22 May 1751
An Act for repairing the Road from Crosford Bridge, (Note: Crossford Bridge is located where the Watling Street Roman road (now the A56 road) crosses the River Mersey between Sale and Stretford. 53°26′05″N 2°18′59″W) through the Townships of Stretford and Hulme, to the Town of Manchester, in the County Palatine of Lancaster. (Repealed by Crossford Bridge and Manchester Road Act 1798 (38 Geo. 3. c. lxxi))
Mercers Company, London Act 1750	24 Geo. 2. c. 14	22 May 1751
An Act for explaining and amending an Act passed in the Twenty-first Year of the Reign of His present Majesty, intituled, "An Act for the Relief of the Annuitants of the Wardens and Commonalty of the Mystery of Mercers of the City of London; and for other Purposes therein mentioned." (Note: Mercers Company, London Act 1747 (21 Geo. 2. c. 32))
Islington Church Act 1750 (repealed)	24 Geo. 2. c. 15	22 May 1751
An Act to enable the Parishioners of the Parish of Saint Mary, Islington, in the County of Middlesex, to rebuild the Church of the said Parish. (Repealed by Statute Law (Repeals) Act 2013 (c. 2))
Small Debts, Lincoln Act 1750 (repealed)	24 Geo. 2. c. 16	22 May 1751
An Act for the more speedy and easy Recovery of small Debts, within the City of Lincoln and County of the same City, and the Liberties and Precincts thereof; and within the Bail of Lincoln, in the County of Lincoln. (Repealed by County Courts Act 1846 (9 & 10 Vict. c. 95))
Richmond and Lancaster Road Act 1750 (repealed)	24 Geo. 2. c. 17	22 May 1751
An Act for repairing the Road leading from the East End of Brumpton High Lane, in the County of York, to the Town of Richmond, and from thence, to and through the Towns of Askrigg and Ingleton, in the said County, to the Town of Lancaster, in the County of Lancaster. (Repealed by Richmond (Yorkshire), Lancaster, Lucy Cross and Gatherley Moor Roads Act 1817 (57 Geo. 3. c. xxvii))
Juries, etc. Act 1750 (repealed)	24 Geo. 2. c. 18	22 May 1751
An Act for the better Regulation of Trials by Jury, and for enlarging the Time for Trials by Nisi Prias, in the County of Middlesex. (Repealed by Statute Law Revision Act 1867 (30 & 31 Vict. c. 59))
Nar Navigation Act 1750	24 Geo. 2. c. 19	22 May 1751
An Act for making the River Nar navigable, from the Town and Port of King's Lynn, to Westacre, in the County of Norfolk.
Preston and Lancaster Road Act 1750 (repealed)	24 Geo. 2. c. 20	22 May 1751
An Act for repairing and widening the Road from Preston to Lancaster, and from thence to a Place called Heiring Syke, (Note: Heron Syke is a stream near the border between Lancaster and Burton-in-Kendal.) that divides the Counties of Lancaster and Preston. (Repealed by Road from Preston to Garstang Act 1823 (4 Geo. 4. c. xiii) and Road from Garstang to Lancaster and Heiring Syke Act 1823 (4 Geo. 4. c. xxiv))
Oxford Roads Act 1750 (repealed)	24 Geo. 2. c. 21	22 May 1751
An Act for enlarging the Term and Powers granted by an Act passed in the Third Year of the Reign of His present Majesty, (Note: Oxfordshire Roads Act 1729 (3 Geo. 2. c. 21)) for repairing and amending the several Roads leading from Woodstock, through Kiddington and Enstone, to Rollright Lane, and from Enslow Bridge to Kiddington aforesaid, in the County of Oxford, and for making the said Act more effectual. (Repealed by Woodstock and Rollright Lane Roads Act 1804 (44 Geo. 3. c. lxxix) and Woodstock and Rollright Lane Roads (Oxfordshire) Act 1825 (6 Geo. 4. c. xciv) (Note: Incorrectly cited as "6 Geo. 4. c. lxv" in the Chronological Table of the Statutes.))
Tadcaster, etc., Roads Act 1750 (repealed)	24 Geo. 2. c. 22	22 May 1751
An Act for explaining and amending so much of an Act passed in the Fourteenth Year of the Reign of His present Majesty, (Note: Leeds and Halifax Roads Act 1740 (14 Geo. 2. c. 32)) for the repairing and enlarging the Roads from the Town of Selby, in the West Riding of the County of York, to the Town of Leeds, and from thence in Two several Branches, one through Bradford and Horton, and the other through Bowling and Wibsey, to the Town of Halifax, in the same Riding, as relates to that Part of the said Roads which lies between Selby and Leeds, and also for repairing the Road from Tadcaster, in the said West Riding, over Bramham Moor, through Kiddell Lane, over Win Moor, and through Seacroft, to a Place called Halton Dyal, where it comes into the abovesaid Road between Selby and Leeds. (Repealed by Tadcaster and Halton Dial Road Act 1819 (59 Geo. 3. c. xciv) and Selby and Leeds Road Act 1820 (1 Geo. 4. c. lxv))
Calendar (New Style) Act 1750	24 Geo. 2. c. 23	22 May 1751
An Act for regulating the Commencement of the Year, and for correcting the Calendar now in Use.
Minority of Successor to Crown Act 1750 or the Minority of Successor to Crown Act 1751 (repealed)	24 Geo. 2. c. 24	22 May 1751
An Act to provide for the Administration of the Government, in case the Crown should descend to any of the Children of his late Royal Highness Frederick Prince of Wales, being under the Age of eighteen Years; and for the Care and Guardianship of their Persons. (Repealed by Statute Law Revision Act 1867 (30 & 31 Vict. c. 59))
Carlisle and Newcastle Road Act 1750 (repealed)	24 Geo. 2. c. 25	22 May 1751
An Act for laying out, making, and keeping in Repair, a Road proper for the Passage of Troops and Carriages, from the City of Carlisle, to the Town of Newcastle upon Tyne. (Repealed by Annual Turnpike Acts Continuance Act 1877 (40 & 41 Vict. c. 64))
Saint Matthew, Bethnal Green (Paving, etc.) Act 1750 (repealed)	24 Geo. 2. c. 26	22 May 1751
An Act for cleansing and enlightening the Open Places, Streets, and other Passages, and regulating the Nightly Watch and Beadles, in the Parish of Saint Matthew Bethnal Green, in the County of Middlesex. (Repealed by Bethnal Green and Shoreditch Improvement Act 1843 (6 & 7 Vict. c. xxxiv))
Golden Square (Rates) Act 1750 (repealed)	24 Geo. 2. c. 27	22 May 1751
An Act to enable the present and future Proprietors and Inhabitants of the House in Golden Square, in the Parish of St. James, Westminster, in the County of Middlesex, to make and levy a Rate on themselves, for raising Money sufficient for the better enclosing, paving, enlightening, and adjoining, of the said Square, and supporting and keeping of the same in Repair for the future. (Repealed by Golden Square (Westminster) Improvement Act 1827 (7 & 8 Geo. 4. c. xliv))
Gloucester and Oxford Road Act 1750 (repealed)	24 Geo. 2. c. 28	22 May 1751
An Act for repairing the Road from the Top of Crickley Hill, in the County of Gloucester, to Frogg Mill, through the Towns of Northleach, Burford, and Witney, and Parishes of Hanborough and Bloden, to Campsfield, in the Parish of Kidlington, in the County of Oxford, and also the Road from Witney, through Ensham, Cumner, and Botley, to the City of Oxford. (Repealed by Crickley Hill and Campsfield Roads Act 1821 (1 & 2 Geo. 4. c. cix), Barrington and Campsfield and Enslow Bridge Roads (Oxfordshire) Act 1834 (4 & 5 Will. 4. c. xciv), Annual Turnpike Acts Continuance Act 1869 (32 & 33 Vict. c. 90), Annual Turnpike Acts Continuance Act 1877 (40 & 41 Vict. c. 64) and Statute Law (Repeals) Act 2013 (c. 2))
Ludlow and Monk's Bridge Road Act 1750 (repealed)	24 Geo. 2. c. 29	22 May 1751
An Act for repairing the Road leading from the Town of Ludlow, in the County of Salop, through Wofferton and Little Hereford, to a Place called Monks Bridge, in the said County, and also from the said Town of Ludlow, to a Place or House called The Maidenhead, at Orleton, in the County of Hereford. (Repealed by Road from Ludlow to Monk's Bridge Act 1820 (1 Geo. 4. c. xxxiv))
Durham Roads Act 1750 (repealed)	24 Geo. 2. c. 30	22 May 1751
An Act for repairing the High Roads leading from Darlington, in the County of Durham, to West Auckland, and several other Roads in the said County, therein mentioned. (Repealed by Durham Roads Act 1795 (35 Geo. 3. c. 139))
Linen and Hempen Manufactures (Scotland) Act 1750 (repealed)	24 Geo. 2. c. 31	22 May 1751
An Act for explaining, amending, and enforcing, an Act passed in the Thirteenth Year of His late Majesty's Reign, intituled, "An Act for the better Regulation of the Linen and Hempen Manufactures, in that Part of Great Britain called Scotland, and for further regulating and encouraging the said Manufactures." (Note: Linen and Hempen Manufactures (Scotland) Act 1726 (13 Geo. 1. c. 26)) (Repealed by Statute Law Revision Act 1867 (30 & 31 Vict. c. 59) and Statute Law Revision Act 1948 (11 & 12 Geo. 6. c. 62))
Beaconsfield and Redhill Road Act 1750 (repealed)	24 Geo. 2. c. 32	22 May 1751
An Act for enlarging the Term and Powers granted by Two Acts of Parliament, (Note: Buckinghamshire Roads Act 1720 (7 Geo. 1. St. 1. c. 24)) (Note: Buckinghamshire Roads Act 1741 (15 Geo. 2. c. 5)) for repairing the Road from Wendover to the Town of Buckingham, in the County of Bucks, and also for repairing and widening the Road leading from the West End of the said Town of Wendover, to the End of a Lane called Oak Lane, next the Great Road called The Oxford Road, lying between the Town of Beconsfield, in the said County of Bucks, and Uxbridge, in the County of Middlesex, and that Part of the said great Road which leads from the West End of the said Town of Beconsfield to the River Colne, near Uxbridge aforesaid. (Repealed by Beaconsfield and Uxbridge Road Act 1806 (46 Geo. 3. c. cii), Wendover and Buckingham Road Act 1810 (50 Geo. 3. c. xcix) and Roads from Wendover and from the River Colne Act 1812 (52 Geo. 3. c. xxx))
Lawton and Cranage Road Act 1750 (repealed)	24 Geo. 2. c. 33	22 May 1751
An Act for enlarging the Term and Powers granted by an Act of Parliament passed in the Fourth Year of His present Majesty's Reign, (Note: Cheshire Roads Act 1730 (4 Geo. 2. c. 3)) for repairing the Roads leading from the most Southern Part of Butt Lane, (Note: Butt Lane in north Staffordshire. 53°04′53″N 2°15′43″W) in the Parish of Lawton, in the County Palatine of Chester, to Lawton, and from thence to Henshall's Smithy, upon Cranage Green, (Note: Cranage in Cheshire. 53°13′33″N 2°22′53″W) in the said County, and for making the said Act more effectual. (Repealed by Roads to and from Lawton (Cheshire) Act 1820 (1 Geo. 4. c. xxxviii))
Game (Scotland) Act 1750 (repealed)	24 Geo. 2. c. 34	22 May 1751
An Act for the better Preservation of the Game, in that Part of Great Britain called Scotland. (Repealed by Game (Scotland) Act 1772 (13 Geo. 3. c. 54))
Edinburgh and Leith Road Act 1750 (repealed)	24 Geo. 2. c. 35	22 May 1751
An Act for repairing the High Roads in the County of Edinburgh, to and from the City of Edinburgh, and from Cramond Bridge to the Town of Queen's Ferry, in the County of Linlithgow. (Repealed by Edinburgh Turnpike Roads Act 1835 (5 & 6 Will. 4. c. lxii))
Fishhouse Bridge, Lancashire Act 1750 (repealed)	24 Geo. 2. c. 36	22 May 1751
An Act for building a Bridge over the River Ribble, between the Townships of Preston and Penwortham, near a Place called The Fish-house, in the County Palatine of Lancaster. (Repealed by Penwortham Bridge Act 1912 (2 & 3 Geo. 5. c. xi))
Bristol Churches Act 1750	24 Geo. 2. c. 37	22 May 1751
An Act for dividing the Parish of St. Philip and Jacob, in the County of Gloucester, and in the City and County of Bristol, and for erecting a Church in the new intended Parish.
Greenock Beer Duties Act 1750 (repealed)	24 Geo. 2. c. 38	22 May 1751
An Act for levying a Duty of Two Pennies Scots, or a Sixth Part of a Penny Sterling, on every Scots Pint of Ale and Beer, which shall be brewed for Sale, brought into, tapped, or sold, within the Town of Greenock, and Baronies of Easter and Wester Greenock and Finnart, and Liberties thereof, in the County of Renfrew, for repairing the Harbour of the said Town, and for other Purposes therein mentioned. (Repealed by Statute Law Revision Act 1948 (11 & 12 Geo. 6. c. 62))
River Avon Navigation Act 1750 or the River Avon Navigation Act 1751	24 Geo. 2. c. 39	22 May 1751
An Act for the better regulating the Navigation of the River Avon, running through the Counties of Warwick, Worcester, and Gloucester, and for ascertaining the Rates of Water Carriage upon the said River.
Sale of Spirits Act 1750 or the Gin Act 1751 (repealed)	24 Geo. 2. c. 40	25 June 1751
An Act for granting to his Majesty an additional Duty upon Spirituous Liquors, and upon Licences for retailing the same; and for repealing the Act of the twentieth year of his present Majesty's Reign, intituled, "An Act for granting a Duty to his Majesty to be paid by Distillers upon Licences to be taken out by them for retailing Spirituous Liquors;" (Note: Distillers Act 1746 (20 Geo. 2. c. 39)) and for the more effectually restraining the Retailing of distilled Spirituous Liquors; and for allowing a Drawback upon the Exportation of British made Spirits; and that the Parish of St. Mary le Bon, in the County of Middlesex, shall be under the Inspection of the Head Office of Excise. (Repealed by Administration of Justice Act 1965 (c. 2))
Tobacco Duties Act 1750 (repealed)	24 Geo. 2. c. 41	25 June 1751
An Act for the more effectual securing the Duties upon Tobacco. (Repealed by Statute Law Revision Act 1867 (30 & 31 Vict. c. 59))
Small Debts, Westminster Act 1750 (repealed)	24 Geo. 2. c. 42	25 June 1751
An Act to explain and amend an Act passed in the last Session of Parliament, intituled, "An Act for the more easy and speedy Recovery of small Debts, within the City and Liberty of Westminster, and that Part of the Dutchy of Lancaster which adjoineth thereto," (Note: Small Debts, Westminster Act 1749 (23 Geo. 2. c. 27)) and for making the said Act more effectual. (Repealed by Westminster Court of Requests Act 1836 (6 & 7 Will. 4 c. cxxxvii))
Highways Act 1750 (repealed)	24 Geo. 2. c. 43	25 June 1751
An Act for the more effectual Preservation of the Turnpike Roads, in that Part of Great Britain called England, and for the Disposition of Penalties given by Acts of Parliament relating to the Highways in that Part of Great Britain called England, and for enforcing the Recovery thereof, and for the more effectual preventing the Mischiefs occasioned by the Drivers riding upon Carts, Drays, Cars, and Waggons, in the City of London and within Ten Miles thereof. (Repealed by Turnpike Roads Act 1766 (7 Geo. 3. c. 40), Highway Act 1835 (5 & 6 Will. 4. c. 50) and Statute Law Revision Act 1948 (11 & 12 Geo. 6. c. 62))
Constables Protection Act 1750	24 Geo. 2. c. 44	25 June 1751
An Act for the rendering Justices of the Peace more safe in the Execution of their Office; and for indemnifying Constables and others acting in obedience to their Warrants.
Robberies on Rivers, etc. Act 1750 (repealed)	24 Geo. 2. c. 45	25 June 1751
An Act for the more effectual preventing of Robberies and Thefts, upon any Navigable Rivers, Ports of Entry, or Discharge-wharfs and Quays adjacent. (Repealed by Statute Law Revision Act 1867 (30 & 31 Vict. c. 59))
Taxation (No. 2) Act 1750 (repealed)	24 Geo. 2. c. 46	25 June 1751
An Act for repealing the Duties now payable upon Foreign Linen Yarns, and for granting other Duties in Lieu thereof. (Repealed by Statute Law Revision Act 1867 (30 & 31 Vict. c. 59))
Supply, etc. Act 1750 (repealed)	24 Geo. 2. c. 47	25 June 1751
An Act for granting to His Majesty the Sum of Six Hundred Thousand Pounds, out of the Sinking Fund, for the Service of the Year One Thousand Seven Hundred and Fifty-one, and for Allowances to poor Widows of Commission and Warrant Officers of the Royal Navy, and for the further appropriating the Supplies granted this Session of Parliament, and for making forth Duplicates of Exchequer Bills, Lottery Tickets, Certificates, Orders of Loan, or Annuity Orders, payable at the Exchequer, in Lieu of such as shall be lost, burnt, or destroyed, and also for making forth new Orders of Loan, or Annuity Orders, in Lieu of such as shall become defaced, obliterated, or otherwise encumbered with Assignments or Endorsements thereon. (Repealed by Statute Law Revision Act 1867 (30 & 31 Vict. c. 59))
Michaelmas Term Act 1750 (repealed)	24 Geo. 2. c. 48	25 June 1751
An Act for the Abbreviation of Michaelmas Term. (Repealed by Supreme Court of Judicature (Consolidation) Act 1925 (15 & 16 Geo. 5. c. 49))
African Company Act 1750 (repealed)	24 Geo. 2. c. 49	25 June 1751
An Act for allowing further Time to the Commissioners appointed by and in Pursuance of an Act of the Twenty-third Year of His present Majesty's Reign, intituled, "An Act for extending and improving the Trade to Africa," (Note: Trade to Africa Act 1749 (23 Geo. 2. c. 31)) to inquire into the Claims of certain Creditors of the Royal African Company therein mentioned, and for the Relief of David Crichton, and for restraining the said Company from disposing of such of their Effects as are therein mentioned, and for staying all Suits for Money due from or on the account of the said Company, for the Time therein mentioned. (Repealed by Statute Law Revision Act 1867 (30 & 31 Vict. c. 59))
Duchy of Cornwall Act 1750 (repealed)	24 Geo. 2. c. 50	25 June 1751
An Act to enable His Majesty to make Leases and Copies of Offices, Lands, and Hereditaments, Parcel of His Dutchy of Cornwall, or annexed to the same. (Repealed by Statute Law Revision Act 1948 (11 & 12 Geo. 6. c. 62))
Pot and Pearl Ashes Act 1750 (repealed)	24 Geo. 2. c. 51	25 June 1751
An Act for encouraging the making of Pot Ashes and Pearl Ashes, in the British Plantations in America. (Repealed by Statute Law Revision Act 1867 (30 & 31 Vict. c. 59))
Continuance of Laws Act 1750 (repealed)	24 Geo. 2. c. 52	25 June 1751
An Act for continuing several Laws therein mentioned, relating to the Premiums upon the Importation of Masts, Yards, and Bowsprits, Tar, Pitch, and Turpentine, to British-made Sail Cloth, and the Duties payable on Foreign Sail Cloth, and to the Allowance upon the Exportation of British-made Gunpowder. (Repealed by Statute Law Revision Act 1867 (30 & 31 Vict. c. 59))
Paper Bills of Credit, American Colonies Act 1750 or the Currency Act 1751 (repealed)	24 Geo. 2. c. 53	25 June 1751
An Act to regulate and restrain Paper Bills of Credit in his Majesty’s Colonies or Plantations of Rhode Island and Providence Plantations, Connecticut, the Massachusets Bay, and New Hampshire in America; and to prevent the same being legal Tenders in Payments of Money. (Repealed by Statute Law Revision Act 1867 (30 & 31 Vict. c. 59))
Distemper Among Cattle Act 1750 (repealed)	24 Geo. 2. c. 54	25 June 1751
An Act for explaining, continuing, and enforcing, several Laws therein mentioned, more effectually to prevent the spreading of the Distemper which now rages amongst the Horned Cattle in this Kingdom. (Repealed by Statute Law Revision Act 1867 (30 & 31 Vict. c. 59))
Apprehension of Endorsed Warrants Act 1750 (repealed)	24 Geo. 2. c. 55	25 June 1751
An Act for amending and making more effectual a Clause in an Act passed in the last Session of Parliament, (Note: Continuance of Laws, etc. Act 1749 (23 Geo. 2. c. 26)) for the apprehending of Persons in any County or Place, upon Warrants granted by Justices of the Peace of any other County or Place. (Repealed by Statute Law Revision Act 1867 (30 & 31 Vict. c. 59))
Bounty on Corn, etc. Act 1750 (repealed)	24 Geo. 2. c. 56	25 June 1751
An Act for ascertaining the Admeasurement of Wheat Meal, or other Corn or Grain ground, for which a Bounty is payable upon Exportation, and for making Allowances to the East India Company, for their Charges and Expences in managing, paying, and transferring, their Reduced Annuities. (Repealed by Statute Law Revision Act 1867 (30 & 31 Vict. c. 59))
Continuance of Laws (No. 2) Act 1750 (repealed)	24 Geo. 2. c. 57	25 June 1751
An Act to continue several Laws therein mentioned, for preventing Theft and Rapine on the Northern Borders of England, for the more effectual punishing wicked and evil-disposed Persons going armed in Disguise, and doing Injuries and Violences to the Persons and Properties of His Majesty's Subjects, and for the more speedy bringing the Offenders to Justice, for continuing Two Clauses, to prevent the cutting or breaking down the Bank of any River or Sea Bank, and to prevent the malicious cutting of Hop-binds, for the more effectual Punishment of Persons maliciously setting on Fire any Mine, Pit, or Delph, of Coal or Cannel Coal, and of Persons unlawfully hunting or taking any Red or Fallow Deer in Forests or Chases, or beating or wounding the Keepers or other Officers in Forests, Chases, or Parks, for granting a Liberty to carry Sugars, of the Growth, Produce, or Manufacture, of any of His Majesty's Sugar Colonies in America, from the said Colonies directly into Foreign Parts, in Ships built in Great Britain, and navigated according to Law, for preventing the committing of Frauds by Bankrupts, for giving further Encouragement for the Importation of Naval Stores from the British Colonies in America, and for preventing Frauds and Abuses in the Admeasurement of Coals, in the City and Liberty of Westminster, and to make some further Provisions in relation to the signing of Certificates for the Discharge of Bankrupts. (Repealed by Statute Law Revision Act 1867 (30 & 31 Vict. c. 59))
Southwark Roads Act 1750 (repealed)	24 Geo. 2. c. 58	25 June 1751
An Act for making, widening, and keeping in Repair, several Roads, in the several Parishes of Lambeth, Newington, St George's Southwark and Bermondsey, in the County of Surrey, and Lewisham, in the County of Kent. (Repealed by Statute Law (Repeals) Act 2013 (c. 2))
Huntingdonshire and Northamptonshire Roads Act 1750 (repealed)	24 Geo. 2. c. 59	25 June 1751
An Act for enlarging of the Terms and Powers, and making more effectual several Acts of Parliament, for repairing and amending the Highways leading from Royston, in the County of Hertford, to Wandsford Bridge, in the County of Huntingdon, so far as relates to the amending of that Part of the Road as lies between a Place called The White Post, on Alconbury Hill, in the County of Huntingdon, and Wandsford Bridge, in the same County, called The North Division, and that the Tolls taken at Saltree and Wandsford Toll Gates may, from and after a certain Time, be lowered, and for repairing the Road leading from Stilron, in the said County of Huntingdon, to Peterborough, in the County of Northampton. (Repealed by Alconbury Hill and Norman Cross Roads (Huntingdonshire) Act 1798 (38 Geo. 3. c. xlviii))

=== Private acts ===
Short title	Citation	Royal assent
Long title
Copley's Divorce Act 1750	24 Geo. 2. c. 1 Pr.	12 March 1751
An Act to dissolve the Marriage of Godfrey Copley Esquire with Anna Maria Brace his now Wife, and to enable him to marry again, and for other Purposes therein mentioned.
Smith's Name Act 1750	24 Geo. 2. c. 2 Pr.	12 March 1751
An Act to enable Samuel Smith Esquire to take and use the Surname of Holworthy only, and bear the Coat Armour of Matthew Holworthy Esquire, deceased, pursuant to the Will of Elizabeth his Widow also deceased.
Heath's Name Act 1750	24 Geo. 2. c. 3 Pr.	12 March 1751
An Act to enable John Heath Esquire, and his Heirs Male, to take and use the Surname and Arms of Duke, according to the Direction of the last Will and Testament of Richard Duke Esquire, deceased.
Naturalization of Liotard, Richard, Ferrand, Boucher and Schenley Act 1750	24 Geo. 2. c. 4 Pr.	12 March 1751
An Act for naturalizing John Liotard, Daniel Richard, Daniel Ferrand, Charles Boucher, and John Schnely.
Krauter's Naturalization Act 1750	24 Geo. 2. c. 5 Pr.	12 March 1751
An Act for naturalizing Christopher Jacob Krauter.
Empowering trustees named in Edward and Hannah Hulse's marriage settlement to lay out part of trust monies for purchase of reversionary estates and lands in possession, to be settled to uses of marriage settlement, with the power to make leases.	24 Geo. 2. c. 6 Pr.	22 March 1751
An Act for empowering the Trustees named in the Settlement made upon the Marriage of Edward Hulse Esquire and Hannah his Wife to lay out Part of the Trust Monies therein mentioned in the Purchase of Reversionary Estates, as well as Lands in Possession, to be settled to the Uses of the said Marriage Settlement, with Power to make Leases thereof, according to the Custom of the Country.
Lane's Name and Arms Act 1750	24 Geo. 2. c. 7 Pr.	22 March 1751
An Act to enable George Lane, heretofore called George Fox, Esquire, and his Issue Male, to take and use the Surname and Arms of Lane, pursuant to the Will of James Lord Viscount Lanesborough, in the Kingdom of Ireland, deceased, and for enroling the said Will, and making the Exemplification thereof Evidence in all Courts of Great Britain and Ireland.
Smith's Name Act 1750	24 Geo. 2. c. 8 Pr.	22 March 1751
An Act to enable Thomas Smith, now called Thomas Panuwell, and the Heirs of his Body, to take and use the Surname and Arms of Panuwell.
Dowager Duchess of Argyll and Greenwich's Estate Act 1750	24 Geo. 2. c. 9 Pr.	22 May 1751
An Act to enable the most Noble Jane Dutchess Dowager of Argyll and Greenwich to grant Leases of the Ground, and Repairing Leases of the Houses and Buildings, in the County of Middlesex, mentioned in the Will of John late Duke of Argyll and Greenwich, deceased.
Earl Cowper's Estate Act 1750	24 Geo. 2. c. 10 Pr.	22 May 1751
An Act for charging divers Houses, Tenements, and Hereditaments, in the City of London, and County of Hertford, Part of the settled Estate of William Earl Cowper, with raising Money, towards defraying the Expences of re-building the said Houses in London, burnt down and destroyed by Fire.
Earl of Egmont's Estate Act 1750	24 Geo. 2. c. 11 Pr.	22 May 1751
An Act for vesting divers Lands, Tenements, and Hereditaments, in the County of Corke, in the Kingdom of Ireland, comprized in the Marriage Settlement of John Earl of Egmont, in him and his Hens, discharged of the Uses of that Settlement, and for settling other Lands and Hereditaments in the said County, of greater Value, in Lieu thereof, to the same Uses.
Peers' Estate Act 1750	24 Geo. 2. c. 12 Pr.	22 May 1751
An Act for Sale of a Capital Messuage at Bromley, and divers Messuages, Lands, and Hereditaments, in the Counties of Middlesex and Essex, late the Estate of Sir Charles Peers Knight, deceased, some Time since One of the Aldermen of the City of London, and for purchasing another Estate, to be settled to the Uses of his Will.
Enabling John Primrose Lord Dalenie to secure a jointure for his mother Mary Countess of Roseberry and make provision for siblings out of the entailed estate of Sir Archibold Primrose.	24 Geo. 2. c. 13 Pr.	22 May 1751
An Act to enable John Primrose Esquire, commonly called Lord Dalmenie, to secure a Jointure to Mary Countess of Roseberry his Mother, and make Provisions for his Brother and Sister, out of the entailed Estate, late of Sir Archibald Primrose Knight, deceased.
Jekyll's Estate Act 1750	24 Geo. 2. c. 14 Pr.	22 May 1751
An Act for vesting the undivided Twelfth Part of John Jekyll, an Infant, in the Real Estate of Sir Joseph Jekyll Knight, deceased, in Trustees, to be sold, for the Purposes therein mentioned.
Pleydell's Estate Act 1750	24 Geo. 2. c. 15 Pr.	22 May 1751
An Act for Sale of the Estate late of Edmund Pleydell Esquire, in Gloucestershire, and for laying out the Money arising by such Sale in the Purchase of another Estate, to be settled to the Uses of his Will.
Maxwell's Estate Act 1750	24 Geo. 2. c. 16 Pr.	22 May 1751
An Act to enable Sir William Maxwell of Monreith Baronet, or other Heirs of Entail for the Time being, to sell Lands in the County of Wigtoun, for Payment of Debts, and other Purposes therein mentioned.
Ellerker's Estate Act 1750	24 Geo. 2. c. 17 Pr.	22 May 1751
An Act for the effectual securing of a Jointure, by Way of Rent Charge, for Barbara Mainwaring Ellerker, Wife of Eaton Mainworing Ellerker Esquire, and raising Portions for then Younger Children, pursuant to an Agreement contained in then Marriage Settlement, and for confirming and establishing the Surname of Ellerker, and the Coat of Arms of the Ellerkers of Risby, in the County of York, and the Crest granted by King Henry the Eighth, to the said Laton Mainwaring Ellerker and his Issue.
Gardner's Estate Act 1750	24 Geo. 2. c. 18 Pr.	22 May 1751
An Act for confirming a Partition of the Estate late of George Gardner Esquire, deceased, and for settling and disposing of the Lands belonging to Edward Bulstrode Esquire, upon the said Partition, for discharging Encumbrances, and for a Provision for himself and his Wife and Children, pursuant to his Marriage Settlement.
Horner's Estate Act 1750	24 Geo. 2. c. 19 Pr.	22 May 1751
An Act to empower the Guardian of Guardians of Thomas Horner Esquire, an Infant, for the Time being, to make Leases and Copyhold Grants of his Estates in the County of Somerset, during his Minority, according to the Usage and Custom of the Country, and for other Purposes therein mentioned.
Moyle's Estate Act 1750	24 Geo. 2. c. 20 Pr.	22 May 1751
An Act for vesting a Messuage and Lands in Suffolk, Part of the settled Estate of Thomas Moyle Esquire, in Trustees, in Trust, to sell the same, pursuant to an Agreement for that Purpose, and for applying the Money arising by such Sale towards the Purchase of another Estate, of greater Value, to be settled to the like Uses.
Queen's College, Oxford (Michel's Foundation) Act 1750	24 Geo. 2. c. 21 Pr.	22 May 1751
An Act for the better effecting the Purposes mentioned in the Will of John Michel, late of Richmond, in the County of Surrey, Esquire, deceased, for the Benefit and Advantage of Queen's College in the University of Oxford.
Welton Inclosure Act 1750	24 Geo. 2. c. 22 Pr.	22 May 1751
An Act to confirm and establish an Agreement, for enclosing and dividing several Lands and Grounds, in the Parish of Welton, in the County of York, and for settling a Yearly Sum on the Vicar, in Lieu of Tithes, and other Purposes therein mentioned.
Yatton Inclosure Act 1750	24 Geo. 2. c. 23 Pr.	22 May 1751
An Act for confirming Articles of Agreement for enclosing and dividing certain Commons and Waste Grounds, in the Parish of Yatton, in the County of Somerset.
Farthingstone Inclosure Act 1750	24 Geo. 2. c. 24 Pr.	22 May 1751
An Act for enclosing and dividing the Common Fields, Common Pastures, Common Meadows, and Waste Grounds, in the Manor and Parish of Farthingstone, in the County of Northampton.
Dunsby Inclosure Act 1750	24 Geo. 2. c. 25 Pr.	22 May 1751
An Act for confirming Articles of Agreement, for enclosing and dividing the Common Fields, Meadows, and Common Fen, in the Manor and Parish of Dunsby, in the County of Lincoln, and for rendering the same more effectual, and for other Purposes therein mentioned.
Besford Common Inclosure Act 1750	24 Geo. 2. c. 26 Pr.	22 May 1751
An Act for empowering Sir Thomas Saunders Sebright Baronet to enclose Besford Common, in the County of Worcester, and for setting out and appointing proper Roads over the same, and for charging the said Common with a perpetual Yearly Rent, in Lieu of certain Rights and Privileges claimed by James Cocks Esquire, as Lord Paramount of the Manor of Besford.
Hutton Bushell Inclosure Act 1750	24 Geo. 2. c. 27 Pr.	22 May 1751
An Act for confirming Articles of Agreement, for enclosing the Common Pastures and Common Grounds, within the Manor of Hutton Bushell, in the County of York.
Menzies' Coal Machine Act 1751	24 Geo. 2. c. 28 Pr.	22 May 1751
An Act for vesting, for a certain Term of Years, in Michael Menzies Esquire, his Executors, Administrators, and Assigns, the sole Property of a Machine, by him invented, for conveying of Coals from the Places where they are dug to the Heaps at the Mouths of the Pits, and in some Cases from the Heaps to the Staiths or Places where they are put on board Ships or Keels.
Taylor's Name Act 1750	24 Geo. 2. c. 29 Pr.	22 May 1751
An Act to enable William Leyborne, formerly called William Leyborne Taylor, to take and use the Surname of Leyborne only, and bear the Coat of Arms of the Family of Leyborne, pursuant to the Will of his Uncle William Leyborne, deceased.
Haughton's Name Act 1750	24 Geo. 2. c. 30 Pr.	22 May 1751
An Act for enabling James Langston, formerly called James Haughton, and his Heirs, to use the Surname, and bear the Family Arms, of Langston, pursuant to the Will of James Langston, his Uncle, deceased.
Wilson's Name Act 1750	24 Geo. 2. c. 31 Pr.	22 May 1751
An Act to enable John Fenwick, lately called John Wilson, and the Heirs Male of his Body, to take the Name and bear the Arms of Fenwick only, pursuant to the Wills of Robert Fenwick and Nicholas Fenwick.
Count Neale's Naturalization Act 1750	24 Geo. 2. c. 32 Pr.	22 May 1751
An Act for naturalizing Count Stephanus Laurentius Neale.
Earl of Powis' Estate Act 1750	24 Geo. 2. c. 33 Pr.	25 June 1751
An Act for establishing and confirming Articles entered into upon the Marriage of Henry Arthur Earl of Powis with Barbara Countess of Powis his Wife, an Infant; and for the more effectually carrying the same into Execution.
Lord Chedworth's Estate Act 1750	24 Geo. 2. c. 34 Pr.	25 June 1751
An Act for enabling the Right Honourable John Thynne Lord Chedworth to settle a Jointure on Martha Parker Spinster, upon their Intermarriage; and for making Provision for their Younger Children; and for explaining the Will of Sir Philip Parker Long Baronet, deceased, and for other Purposes therein mentioned.
Earl of Dalkeith's Estate Act 1750	24 Geo. 2. c. 35 Pr.	25 June 1751
An Act for compleating the Sale of an Estate late of Francis Scott, commonly called Earl of Dalkeith, deceased, in the County of Lincoln, and for applying the Money arising thereby, pursuant to an Agreement for that Purpose, and for empowering the Guardians of the Heir of the said late Earl for the Time being, to make Leases of Ground and Buildings in the County of Middlesex, during the Minority of such Heir.
Viscount Kilmorey's Estate Act 1750	24 Geo. 2. c. 36 Pr.	25 June 1751
An Act for Sale of Part of the settled Estate of Thomas Lord Viscount Kilmorey, in the Kingdom of Ireland, for raising Money, to discharge the Encumbrances affecting the same prior to his Marriage Settlement; and for laying out the Surplus thereof in the Purchase of other Lands and Hereditaments, to be settled to the Uses of the said Settlement.
Vesting lands in Leicestershire, Staffordshire and Derbyshire devised in Sarah Frowde's will to Ralph Blois and settling an estate in Suffolk to uses limited by will.	24 Geo. 2. c. 37 Pr.	25 June 1751
An Act for vesting the undivided Moiety of divers Lands and Hereditaments, in the Counties of Leicester, Stafford, and Derby, devised by the Will of Sarah Frowde Widow, deceased, in Ralph Blois Clerk, in Fee Simple, and for settling an entire Estate, in the County of Suffolk, of greater Value, to the Uses limited by the same Will.
Barlow's Estate Act 1750	24 Geo. 2. c. 38 Pr.	25 June 1751
An Act for vesting Part of the settled Estate of George Barlow Esquire in him and his Heirs, and for settling another Part of his Estate, of greater Value, to the same Uses, except as therein is excepted, in Lieu thereof.
Newland's Estates Act 1750	24 Geo. 2. c. 39 Pr.	25 June 1751
An Act for Sale of the Estates late of William Newland Esquire, deceased, in Gatton, Rygate, and Meastham, in the County of Surry, for discharging Encumbrances.
Wood's Estates Act 1750	24 Geo. 2. c. 40 Pr.	25 June 1751
An Act for Sale of certain Estates, in the County of Stafford, of Christopher Wood Esquire, for discharging Encumbrances affecting the same, and for settling other Lands in Lieu thereof.
Making leases for lands, tenements and mines in Cornwall comprised in Kellond Courtenay's marriage settlement and will and during the minority of issue concerned.	24 Geo. 2. c. 41 Pr.	25 June 1751
An Act for making and granting Leases of Lands, Tenements, and Mines, in the County of Cornwall, comprized in the Marriage Settlement and Will of Kellond Courtenay Esquire, deceased, during the Minority of his Issue, claiming under the said Settlement and Will.
Courtenay's Estate Act 1750	24 Geo. 2. c. 42 Pr.	25 June 1751
An Act for selling Part of the settled Estate of George Courtenay Esquire, for discharging Encumbrances affecting the same, and for enabling him to make a Provision for his Wife and Children, pursuant to his Marriage Articles.
FitzMaurice's Name Act 1750	24 Geo. 2. c. 43 Pr.	25 June 1751
An Act to enable the Honourable John Fitz Maurice and his Issue to take and use the Surname of Petty, pursuant to the Will of the Right Honourable Henry Earl of Shelburne in the Kingdom of Ireland, deceased.
Stubblefield's Name Act 1750	24 Geo. 2. c. 44 Pr.	25 June 1751
An Act for enabling Robert King Stubblefield Gentleman and his Issue to take and use the Surname of King.
Naturalization of Baron de Soesdyk Van Cloon, Lord of Rhynwick Act 1750	24 Geo. 2. c. 45 Pr.	25 June 1751
An Act for naturalizing Philip Jacob Baron de Soesdyk Van Cloon Lord of Rhynwick.
Naturalization of Jugla, Cogigian, Zornlin and Speck Act 1750	24 Geo. 2. c. 46 Pr.	25 June 1751
An Act for naturalizing John Jugla, Stephan Cogigian, John Jacob Zornlin, and John Adolph Speck.

=== Sources ===
- Pickering, Danby, ed. (1765). "Anno vicesimo quarto Georgii II.". The Statutes at Large. Vol. 20: From the 23rd to the 26th Year of King George II. Printed by J. Bentham. pp. 140–320 – via Internet Archive.
- Pickering, Danby, ed. (1765). "Anno vicesimo quarto Georgii II.". The Statutes at Large. Vol. 20: From the 23rd to the 26th Year of King George II. pp. 140–320 – via Google Books.
- Pickering, Danby, ed. (1765). "Anno vicesimo quarto Georgii II.". The Statutes at Large. Vol. 20: From the 23rd to the 26th Year of King George II. C. Eyre and A. Strahan. pp. 140–320 – via Internet Archive.
- Journals of the House of Commons. Vol. 26. London: His Majesty's Stationery Office. 1803. pp. 3–297 – via Google Books.
- Chronological Table of and Index to the Statutes. Vol. 1: To the End of the Session 59 Vict. Sess. 2 (1895) (13th ed.). London: Her Majesty's Stationery Office. 1896. pp. 113–114 – via Google Books.
- "Acts of the Parliament of Great Britain from 1750". legislation.gov.uk. The National Archives.

== See also ==
- List of acts of the Parliament of Great Britain
