= List of acts of the Parliament of Great Britain from 1749 =

This is a complete list of acts of the Parliament of Great Britain for the year 1749.

For acts passed until 1707, see the list of acts of the Parliament of England and the list of acts of the Parliament of Scotland. See also the list of acts of the Parliament of Ireland.

For acts passed from 1801 onwards, see the list of acts of the Parliament of the United Kingdom. For acts of the devolved parliaments and assemblies in the United Kingdom, see the list of acts of the Scottish Parliament, the list of acts of the Northern Ireland Assembly, and the list of acts and measures of Senedd Cymru; see also the list of acts of the Parliament of Northern Ireland.

The number shown after each act's title is its chapter number. Acts are cited using this number, preceded by the year(s) of the reign during which the relevant parliamentary session was held; thus the Union with Ireland Act 1800 is cited as "39 & 40 Geo. 3. c. 67", meaning the 67th act passed during the session that started in the 39th year of the reign of George III and which finished in the 40th year of that reign. Note that the modern convention is to use Arabic numerals in citations (thus "41 Geo. 3" rather than "41 Geo. III").

Acts of the last session of the Parliament of Great Britain and the first session of the Parliament of the United Kingdom are both cited as "41 Geo. 3". Acts passed by the Parliament of Great Britain did not have a short title; however, some of these acts have subsequently been given a short title by acts of the Parliament of the United Kingdom (such as the Short Titles Act 1896).

Before the Acts of Parliament (Commencement) Act 1793 came into force on 8 April 1793, acts passed by the Parliament of Great Britain were deemed to have come into effect on the first day of the session in which they were passed. Because of this, the years given in the list below may in fact be the year before a particular act was passed.

== 23 Geo. 2 ==
The third session of the 10th Parliament of Great Britain, which met from 16 November 1749 until 12 April 1750.

This session was also traditionally cited as 23 G. 2.

=== Public acts ===
Short title	Citation	Royal assent
Long title
National Debt (No. 1) Act 1749 (repealed)	23 Geo. 2. c. 1	20 December 1749
An Act for reducing the several Annuities which now carry an Interest after the Rate of Four Pounds per Centum per Annum to the several Rates of Interest therein mentioned. (Repealed by Bank Act 1892 (55 & 56 Vict. c. 48) and Statute Law Revision Act 1953 (2 & 3 Eliz. 2. c. 5))
Land Tax Act 1749 (repealed)	23 Geo. 2. c. 2	20 December 1749
An Act for granting an Aid to His Majesty, by a Land Tax, to be raised in Great Britain, for the Service of the Year One Thousand Seven Hundred and Fifty. (Repealed by Statute Law Revision Act 1867 (30 & 31 Vict. c. 59))
Taxation Act 1749 (repealed)	23 Geo. 2. c. 3	14 March 1750
An Act for continuing and granting to His Majesty certain Duties upon Malt, Mum, Cyder, and Perry, for the Service of the Year One Thousand Seven Hundred and Fifty. (Repealed by Statute Law Revision Act 1867 (30 & 31 Vict. c. 59))
Mutiny Act 1749 (repealed)	23 Geo. 2. c. 4	14 March 1750
An Act for punishing Mutiny and Desertion, and for the better Payment of the Army and their Quarters. (Repealed by Statute Law Revision Act 1867 (30 & 31 Vict. c. 59))
Manchester Roads Act 1749 (repealed)	23 Geo. 2. c. 5	14 March 1750
An Act for enlarging the Term and Powers granted by an Act passed in the Fifth Year of the Reign of His present Majesty, (Note: Manchester Roads Act 1731 (5 Geo. 2. c. 10)) for repairing and amending the Roads leading from the Town of Manchester, in the County of Lancaster, through the Town of Ashton under Line, and Parish of Mottram Longdendale, and from thence to Salter's Brook, in the County Palatine of Chester. (Repealed by Manchester to Chester Roads Act 1793 (33 Geo. 3. c. 139))
Great Yarmouth Haven Act 1749 (repealed)	23 Geo. 2. c. 6	14 March 1750
An Act for repairing, improving, and maintaining the Haven and Piers of Great Yarmouth, and for depthening and making more navigable the several Rivers emptying themselves into the said Haven, and also for preserving Ships wintering therein from Accidents by Fire. (Repealed by Statute Law Revision Act 1948 (11 & 12 Geo. 6. c. 62))
Wigan to Preston Road Act 1749 (repealed)	23 Geo. 2. c. 7	14 March 1750
An Act for enlarging the Term and Powers granted and continued by Two former Acts of Parliament, (Note: Wigan to Preston Road Act 1726 (13 Geo. 1. c. 9)) (Note: Wigan to Preston Road 1730 (4 Geo. 2. c. 31)) for repairing, widening, and amending, the Roads from Wigan to Preston, in the County Palatine of Lancaster, and for making the said Acts more effectual. (Repealed by Wigan to Preston Road Act 1779 (19 Geo. 3. c. 92))
Northamptonshire Roads Act 1749 (repealed)	23 Geo. 2. c. 8	14 March 1750
An Act for enlarging the Term and Powers granted and continued by Two Acts of Parliament (Note: Nottingham and Leicester Highways Act 1721 (8 Geo. 1. c. 13)) (Note: Northamptonshire Roads Act 1738 (12 Geo. 2. c. 35)) for amending the Highways leading from Brampton Bridge, to Welford Bridge, in the County of Northampton, and the great Post Road from Morter-Pitt Hill to Chain-Bridge, leading into Market Harborough, in the County of Leicester, and for explaining and making more effectual the said Acts, and also for repairing the Roads leading from Morter-Pitt-Hill and Brampton Bridge to the Town of Northampton. (Repealed by Northampton Roads Act 1778 (18 Geo. 3. c. 112))
Taxation (No. 2) Act 1749 (repealed)	23 Geo. 2. c. 9	14 March 1750
An Act for repealing the Duties now payable upon China Raw Silk, and for granting other Duties in Lieu thereof. (Repealed by Statute Law Revision Act 1867 (30 & 31 Vict. c. 59))
Fulham Roads Act 1749 (repealed)	23 Geo. 2. c. 10	14 March 1750
An Act for enlarging the Term and Powers granted by an Act passed in the Fourth Year of the Reign of His present Majesty, (Note: Fulham Roads Act 1730 (4 Geo. 2. c. 34)) for repairing the Road leading from the Town of Fulham, in the County of Middlesex, through Fulham Fields, to the great Road near the Pound at Hammersmith, in the said County. (Repealed by Statute Law (Repeals) Act 2013 (c. 2))
Prosecutions for Perjury Act 1749 (repealed)	23 Geo. 2. c. 11	14 March 1750
An Act to render Prosecutions for Perjury and Subornation of Perjury more easy and effectual. (Repealed by Statute Law Revision Act 1867 (30 & 31 Vict. c. 59))
River Lune Navigation Act 1749 (repealed)	23 Geo. 2. c. 12	14 March 1750
An Act for improving the Navigation of the River Loyne, otherwise called Lune; and for building a Quay or wharf near the Town of Lancaster in the County Palatine of Lancaster. (Repealed by Lancaster Port Commission Revision Order 1967 (SI 1968/532))
Artificers, etc. Act 1749 (repealed)	23 Geo. 2. c. 13	12 April 1750
An Act for the effectual punishing of Persons convicted of seducing Artificers on the Manufactures of Great Britain or Ireland out of the Dominions of the Crown of Great Britain, and to prevent the Exportation of Utensils made Use of in the Woollen and Silk Manufactures from Great Britain or Ireland into Foreign Parts, and for the more easy and speedy Determination of Appeals allowed in certain Cases, by an Act made in the last Session of Parliament, (Note: Frauds by Workmen Act 1748 (22 Geo. 2. c. 27)) relating to Persons employed in the several Manufactures therein mentioned. (Repealed by Statute Law Revision Act 1867 (30 & 31 Vict. c. 59))
Westminster Market Act 1749 (repealed)	23 Geo. 2. c. 14	12 April 1750
An Act for assigning a Place proper for holding the Market in the City of Westminster, in Lieu of the ancient Market-place called The Round Woolstaple, and for regulating the said Market. (Repealed by Statute Law Revision Act 1948 (11 & 12 Geo. 6. c. 62))
Gloucester Streets Act 1749	23 Geo. 2. c. 15	12 April 1750
An Act for taking down several Buildings, and enlarging the Streets and Market-places, in the City of Gloucester.
National Debt Act 1749 (repealed)	23 Geo. 2. c. 16	12 April 1750
An Act for granting to His Majesty the Sum of One Million, to be raised by Annuities at Three Pounds per Centum per Annum, and charged on the Sinking Fund, transferrable at the Bank of England. (Repealed by Statute Law Revision Act 1870 (33 & 34 Vict. c. 69))
Haddington County Roads Act 1749 (repealed)	23 Geo. 2. c. 17	12 April 1750
An Act for repairing the Roads leading from Dunglas Bridge to the Town of Haddingtoun, and from thence to Ravenshawburn, in the County of Haddingtoun. (Repealed by Haddington Roads Act 1811 (51 Geo. 3. c. cxxvii))
Southwark Streets Act 1749 (repealed)	23 Geo. 2. c. 18	12 April 1750
An Act for enlightening the open Places, Streets, Lanes, Passages, and Courts, and for the better regulating the Nightly Watch, within the Parish of Saint John, Southwark, in the County of Surry. (Repealed by Statute Law (Repeals) Act 2013 (c. 2))
River Colne Navigation Act 1749 (repealed)	23 Geo. 2. c. 19	12 April 1750
An Act for making more effectual several Acts of Parliament passed for cleansing and making navigable the Channel from The Hithe at Colchester to Wivenhoe, in the County of Essex, and for repairing and cleaning the Streets and Lanes of the Town of Colchester. (Repealed by Colchester and Wivenhoe Navigation and Colchester Improvement Act 1811 (51 Geo. 3. c. xliii))
Growth of Raw Silk Act 1749 (repealed)	23 Geo. 2. c. 20	12 April 1750
An Act for encouraging the Growth and Culture of Raw Silk in His Majesty's Colonies or Plantations in America. (Repealed by Statute Law Revision Act 1867 (30 & 31 Vict. c. 59))
Supply, etc. Act 1749 (repealed)	23 Geo. 2. c. 21	12 April 1750
An Act for granting to His Majesty the Sum of Nine Hundred Thousand Pounds, out of the Sinking Fund, for the Service of the Year One Thousand Seven Hundred and Fifty, and for applying certain Surplus monies remaining in the Exchequer as Part of the Supply of the said Year, and for the Application of certain Savings in the Hands of the Paymaster General, and for obviating a Doubt in an Act of the Fifth Year of King George the First, (Note: Taxation, etc. Act 1718 (5 Geo. 1. c. 2)) in respect to the Payment of certain Annuities thereby granted, for the Improvement of Fisheries and Manufactures in Scotland, and for the further appropriating the Supplies granted this Session of Parliament, and for giving further Time for the Payment of Duties omitted to be paid for the Indentures or Contracts of Clerks and Apprentices, and for transferring the Bounties now payable upon the Exportation of British Sail Cloth to the Customs; and for enforcing the Laws against the clandestine Importation of Soap, Candles, and Starch, into this Kingdom. (Repealed by Statute Law Revision Act 1867 (30 & 31 Vict. c. 59))
National Debt (No. 2) Act 1749 (repealed)	23 Geo. 2. c. 22	12 April 1750
An Act for giving further Time to the Proprietors of Annuities after the Rate of Four Pounds per Centum per Annum to subscribe the same, in the Manner, and upon the Terms, therein mentioned, and for redeeming such of the said Annuities as shall not be so subscribed, and for empowering the East India Company to raise certain Sums by transferrable Annuities. (Repealed by Statute Law Revision Act 1887 (50 & 51 Vict. c. 59), Bank Act 1892 (55 & 56 Vict. c. 48) and Statute Law Revision Act 1953 (2 & 3 Eliz. 2. c. 5))
Distemper Amongst Cattle Act 1749 (repealed)	23 Geo. 2. c. 23	12 April 1750
An Act to continue several Laws, for preventing the spreading of the Distemper which now rages amongst the Horned Cattle, and for empowering His Majesty to prohibit the killing of Cow-Calves. (Repealed by Statute Law Revision Act 1867 (30 & 31 Vict. c. 59))
Herring Fishery Act 1749 (repealed)	23 Geo. 2. c. 24	12 April 1750
An Act for the Encouragement of the British White Herring Fishery. (Repealed by Statute Law Revision Act 1867 (30 & 31 Vict. c. 59))
Clerk of the Hanaper Act 1749 (repealed)	23 Geo. 2. c. 25	12 April 1750
An Act for making good a Deficiency upon the Revenue of the Office of Keeper or Clerk of the Hanaper, and for preventing any future Deficiency therein, to answer the public Services provided for out of the same, and for augmenting the Income of the Office of Master or Keeper of the Rolls. (Repealed by Statute Law Revision Act 1867 (30 & 31 Vict. c. 59))
Continuance of Laws, etc. Act 1749 (repealed)	23 Geo. 2. c. 26	12 April 1750
An Act to continue several Laws for the better regulating of Pilots, for the conducting of Ships and Vessels from Dover, Deal, and Isle of Thanet, up the River of Thames and Medway, and for permitting Rum or Spirits of the British Sugar Plantations to be landed before the Duties of Excise are paid thereon, and to continue and amend an Act for preventing Frauds in the Admeasurement of Coals, within the City and Liberty of Westminster, and several Parishes near thereunto, and to continue several Laws, for preventing Exactions of Occupiers of Locks and Wears upon the River Thames Westward, and for ascertaining the Rates of Water Carriage upon the said River, and for the better Regulation and Government of Seamen in the Merchants Service, and also to amend so much of an Act made in the First Year of the Reign of King George the First (Note: Fish Act 1714 (1 Geo. 1. St. 2. c. 18)) as relates to the better Preservation of Salmon in the River Ribble, and to regulate Fees in Trials at Assizes and Nisi Prius, upon Records issuing out of the Office of Pleas of the Court of Exchequer, and for the apprehending of Persons in any County or Place upon Warrants granted by Justices of the Peace in any other County or Place, and to repeal so much of an Act made in the Twelfth Year of the Reign of King Charles the Second (Note: Tenures Abolition Act 1660 (12 Cha. 2. c. 24)) as relates to the Time during which the Office of Excise is to be kept open each Day, and to appoint for how long Time the same shall be kept open each Day for the future, and to prevent the stealing or destroying of Turnips, and to amend an Act made in the Second Year of His present Majesty, (Note: Attorneys and Solicitors Act 1728 (2 Geo. 2. c. 23)) for better Regulation of Attornies and Solicitors. (Repealed by Statute Law Revision Act 1867 (30 & 31 Vict. c. 59))
Small Debts, Westminster Act 1749 (repealed)	23 Geo. 2. c. 27	12 April 1750
An Act for the more easy and speedy Recovery of small Debts, within the City and Liberty of Westminster, and that Part of the Dutchy of Lancaster which adjoineth thereto. (Repealed by Westminster Court of Requests Act 1836 (6 & 7 Will. 4. c. cxxxvii))
Uniformity of Worship Act 1749 (repealed)	23 Geo. 2. c. 28	12 April 1750
An Act to explain Part of an Act passed in the Thirteenth and Fourteenth Years of the Reign of King Charles the Second, (Note: Act of Uniformity 1662 (14 Cha. 2. c. 4)) for the Uniformity of Public Prayers and Administration of Sacraments, and also Part of an Act passed in the Thirteenth Year of the Reign of Queen Elizabeth, (Note: Ordination of Ministers Act 1571 (13 Eliz. 1. c. 12)) for the Ministers of the Church to be of sound Religion. (Repealed by Clerical Subscription Act 1865 (28 & 29 Vict. c. 122))
Importation, etc. Act 1749 or the Iron Act 1749 (repealed)	23 Geo. 2. c. 29	12 April 1750
An Act to encourage the importation of pig and bar iron from his Majesty's colonies in America; and to prevent the erection of any mill or other engine for slitting or rolling of iron; or any plateing forge to work with a tilt hammer; or any furnace for making steel, in any of the said colonies. (Repealed by Statute Law Revision Act 1867 (30 & 31 Vict. c. 59))
Small Debts (Tower Hamlets) Act 1749 (repealed)	23 Geo. 2. c. 30	12 April 1750
An Act for the more easy and speedy Recovery of small Debts, within The Tower Hamlets. (Repealed by County Courts Act 1846 (9 & 10 Vict. c. 95))
Trade to Africa Act 1749 (repealed)	23 Geo. 2. c. 31	12 April 1750
An Act for extending and improving the Trade to Africa. (Repealed by Statute Law Revision Act 1867 (30 & 31 Vict. c. 59))
Sail Cloth Act 1749 (repealed)	23 Geo. 2. c. 32	12 April 1750
An Act for granting to His Majesty certain Duties upon such Species of Sail Cloth as are therein mentioned, which shall be imported from Ireland into Great Britain, during the Time therein limited. (Repealed by Statute Law Revision Act 1867 (30 & 31 Vict. c. 59))
Small Debts, Middlesex Act 1749 (repealed)	23 Geo. 2. c. 33	12 April 1750
An Act for preventing Delays and Expences in the Proceedings in the County Court of Middlesex, and for the more easy and speedy Recovery of small Debts in the said County Court. (Repealed by County Courts Act 1846 (9 & 10 Vict. c. 95))
Importation of Raw Silk Act 1749 (repealed)	23 Geo. 2. c. 34	12 April 1750
An Act for permitting Raw Silk, of the Growth or Produce of Persia, purchased in Russia, to be imported into this Kingdom from any Port or Place belonging to the Empire of Russia. (Repealed by Repeal of Acts Concerning Importation (No. 2) Act 1822 (3 Geo. 4. c. 42))
Saint Martin's in the Fields (Poor Relief) Act 1749 (repealed)	23 Geo. 2. c. 35	12 April 1750
An Act for making a better and more effectual Provision for the Relief of the Poor, for the cleansing the Streets, and for keeping a Nightly Watch, within the Parish of Saint Martin in the Fields, within the Liberties of the City of Westminster. (Repealed by London Government (City of Westminster) Order in Council 1901 (SR&O 1901/278))
Rectory of Saint George, Southwark Act 1749 (repealed)	23 Geo. 2. c. 36	12 April 1750
An Act for settling a Stipend, or Maintenance, upon the Rector of the Parish of Saint George the Martyr, in the Borough of Southwark, in the County of Surry, and his Successors, in Lieu of Tithes. (Repealed by St. George the Martyr, Southwark, Support of Rector Act 1807 (47 Geo. 3 Sess. 2. c. cxxxii))
Hampton Court Bridge Act 1749 (repealed)	23 Geo. 2. c. 37	12 April 1750
An Act for building a Bridge cross the River of Thames, from Hampton Court, in the County of Middlesex, to East Moulsey, in the County of Surry. (Repealed by Statute Law Revision Act 1948 (11 & 12 Geo. 6. c. 62))
York and Boroughbridge Road Act 1749 (repealed)	23 Geo. 2. c. 38	12 April 1750
An Act for repairing the Road from the City of York, over Skipbridge, to Boroughbridge, in the County of York. (Repealed by York and Boroughbridge Road Act 1818 (58 Geo. 3. c. ii) and Annual Turnpike Acts Continuance Act 1870 (33 & 34 Vict. c. 73))
Whitby Harbour Act 1749 (repealed)	23 Geo. 2. c. 39	12 April 1750
An Act for the more effectual repairing and preserving the Piers and Harbour of Whitby, in the County of York. (Repealed by Whitby Piers and Harbour Act 1827 (7 & 8 Geo. 4. c. lxxviii))
Cumberland Roads Act 1749	23 Geo. 2. c. 40	12 April 1750
An Act for repairing and widening the Roads leading from Egremont to Dudden Bridge, Santon Bridge, and Salthouse, in the County of Cumberland.

=== Private acts ===
Short title	Citation	Royal assent
Long title
Naturalization of Ogier and Gauvain Act 1749	23 Geo. 2. c. 1 Pr.	20 December 1749
An Act for naturalizing Thomas Abraham Ogier, Peter Henry Gauvain, and others.
Lindegren's Naturalization Act 1749	23 Geo. 2. c. 2 Pr.	20 December 1749
An Act for naturalizing Charles Lindegren.
Joly's Naturalization Act 1749	23 Geo. 2. c. 3 Pr.	20 December 1749
An Act for naturalizing Henry Joly.
Lavie's Naturalization Act 1749	23 Geo. 2. c. 4 Pr.	20 December 1749
An Act for naturalizing Germain Lavie.
Vesting in trustees the manors of Spalding and Holbeck, and other leases and estates mentioned in Lincolnshire, which were forfeited by James Duke of Monmouth put in exigent upon an indictment of high treason, to intent that the loss of record of such indictment and capias and exigent thereon may be supplied for purposes mentioned.	23 Geo. 2. c. 5 Pr.	14 March 1750
An Act for vesting in Trustees, certain Leases and Estates therein mentioned, of and in the Manors of Spalding and Holbech, and of several Lands, Tenements, and Hereditaments, to the same belonging, in the County of Lincoln, which were forfeited by Jomes late Duke of Monmouth, put in Exigent upon an Indictment of High Treason, to the Insent that the Loss of the Record of such Indictment, and of the Capias and Exigent thereon, may be supplied, for the Purposes therein mentioned.
Earl of Bradford's Estate Act 1749	23 Geo. 2. c. 6 Pr.	14 March 1750
An Act to empower the Committees of Thomas Earl of Bradford, a Lunatick, to lay out Put of his Personal Estate in the Purchase of Lands and Estates of Inheritance, for the Purposes therein mentioned.
Enabling King to grant inheritance of manor of Garstang (Lancashire) and a messuage or tenement in Newbiggin in Lonsdale (Westmoreland) to trustees for Edward Walpole and heirs upon full consideration for the same.	23 Geo. 2. c. 7 Pr.	14 March 1750
An Act to enable His Majesty to grant the Inheritance of the Manor of Garstang, in the County of Lancaster, and of a Messuage or Tenement in Newbigginge in Lonsdale, in the County of Westmorland, to Trustees, in Trust for the Honourable Edward Walpole Esquire and his Heirs, upon a full and valuable Consideration to be paid for the same.
Mortlock's Name Act 1749	23 Geo. 2. c. 8 Pr.	14 March 1750
An Act to enable Roger Mortlock Doctor in Divinity, now called Roger Pettiward, and the Heirs of his Body, to take and use the Surname and Arms of Pettiward.
Kendall's Name Act 1749	23 Geo. 2. c. 9 Pr.	14 March 1750
An Act to enable Beckford Kendall Esquire, now called Beckford Kendall Cater, and his Issue Male, to take and use the Surname and Arms of Cater.
Naturalization of Mandrot, Chabanel, de Drusina and Others Act 1749	23 Geo. 2. c. 10 Pr.	14 March 1750
An Act for naturalizing John Peter Mandrot, Lewis Chabanel, William de Drusina, and others.
Schomberg's Naturalization Act 1749	23 Geo. 2. c. 11 Pr.	14 March 1750
An Act for naturalizing Isaac Schomberg Doctor in Physick.
Hake's Naturalization Act 1749	23 Geo. 2. c. 12 Pr.	14 March 1750
An Act for naturalizing Engelbert Hake.
Earl of Pembroke and Montgomery's Estate Act 1749	23 Geo. 2. c. 13 Pr.	12 April 1750
An Act to empower the Guardians of Henry Earl of Pembroke and Montgomery, an Infant, to make Leases of his Real Estate, during his Minority.
Hugh Earl of Northumberland's Name and Arms Act 1749	23 Geo. 2. c. 14 Pr.	12 April 1750
An Act to enable Hugh Earl of Northumberland and Elizabeth Countess of Northumberland and Baroness Percy his Wife, and their Children, Progeny, and Issue, to take and use the Name of Percy, and bear and quarter the Arms of the Percys Earls of Northumberland.
Moystyn's Estate Act 1749	23 Geo. 2. c. 15 Pr.	12 April 1750
An Act for Sale of Part of the Estate of Sir Thomas Mostyn Baronet, in the County of Anglesey, for Payment of Debts, and for providing a Recompense to his Eldest Son and Issue, in Lieu thereof.
Establishing a partition between Dame Mary Latre's and others of estates in West Thurrock and Stafford (Essex) in pursuance of several orders of the High Court of Chancery.	23 Geo. 2. c. 16 Pr.	12 April 1750
An Act for establishing a Partition made between Dame Mary Lake and others, of divers Estates in the Parishes of West Thorock and Stifford, in the County of Essex, in Pursuance of several Orders of the High Court of Chancery.
Trevor's Estate Act 1749	23 Geo. 2. c. 17 Pr.	12 April 1750
An Act for empowering Trustees to cut down and sell Timber upon the Estate late of John Trevor Esquire, in the Counties of Denbigh and Flint, for discharging his Debts, and also to make Leases of Mines in the said Counties.
Churchill's Estate Act 1749	23 Geo. 2. c. 18 Pr.	12 April 1750
An Act for investing Part of the Personal Estate of Charles Churchill Esquire, deceased, in the Purchase of Lands, to be settled pursuant to an Agreement in the Settlement made on the Marriage of Charles Churchill Junior Esquire with Lady Maria Walpole.
Barker's Estate Act 1749	23 Geo. 2. c. 19 Pr.	12 April 1750
An Act for Sale of the Manor of Mursley, and other Estates, in the County of Bucks, lately belonging to Hugh Barker the Younger Esquire, deceased, pursuant to an Agreement made with him for that Purpose.
Lanoe's Estate Act 1749	23 Geo. 2. c. 20 Pr.	12 April 1750
An Act for making effectual an Agreement for Sale of a Messuage at Farley Hill, in the County of Berks, with the Appurtenances, late the Estate of Colonel Charles Lanoe, deceased, to Alexander Walker Esquire.
Hylton's Estate Act 1749	23 Geo. 2. c. 21 Pr.	12 April 1750
An Act for Sale of the Estates devised by the Will of John Hylton Esquire, deceased, and for applying the Money arising thereby in the Payment of his Debts and Legacies.
Walters' Estate Act 1749	23 Geo. 2. c. 22 Pr.	12 April 1750
An Act for explaining and amending several Powers contained in the Settlements made on the Marriage of Henry Walters Gentleman and Anne his Wife, and for rendering the same more effectual for the Purposes thereby intended.
Shepheard's Estate Act 1749	23 Geo. 2. c. 23 Pr.	12 April 1750
An Act to empower the Executors and Trustees of Samuel Shepheard Esquire, deceased, to sell his Houses at Exning in Suffolk and in Cavendish Square, and the Plate and Furniture thereto belonging, and to apply the Money produced by such Sale as the Court of Chancery shall direct or appoint.
Needham and Hurleston Estates Act 1749	23 Geo. 2. c. 24 Pr.	12 April 1750
An Act for Sale of Part of the Estate of John Needham Esquire and Anne his Wife, John Leche Esquire and Mary his Wife, and Elizabeth Hurleston, for discharging Encumbrances affecting the same, and other Purposes therein mentioned.
William Cowper's Estate Act 1749	23 Geo. 2. c. 25 Pr.	12 April 1750
An Act to enable William Cowper Esquire to settle a Jointure upon his present Wife, and to make Leases of certain Estates in the County of Hertford.
Dolman's Estate Act 1749	23 Geo. 2. c. 26 Pr.	12 April 1750
An Act for empowering Trustees to raise Money out of the settled Estate of Robert Dolman Esquire, for discharging several Debts and Sums of Money contracted and borrowed by him.
Stanley's Estate Act 1749	23 Geo. 2. c. 27 Pr.	12 April 1750
An Act for vesting the Estates of Richard Stanley Esquire, a Lunatick, lying in the Counties of Kent and Middlesex, in Trustees, to be sold, for the Payment of several Debts and Encumbrances thereon, and for other Purposes therein mentioned.
Sergison's Estate Act 1749	23 Geo. 2. c. 28 Pr.	12 April 1750
An Act to sell Part of the settled Estate of Thomas Sergison Esquire, and to lay out the Money arising thereby in the Purchase of Lands and Hereditaments, to be settled in Lieu thereof.
Nisbet's Estate Act 1749	23 Geo. 2. c. 29 Pr.	12 April 1750
An Act to enable William Nisbet of Dirleton Esquire, and the Heirs of Entail for the Time being, to make Leases of Lands in the County of Haddington, and for other Purposes therein mentioned.
Orme's Estate Act 1749	23 Geo. 2. c. 30 Pr.	12 April 1750
An Act for raising Money by Sale on Mortgage of the Estate of Garton Orme Esquire, in the County of Sussex, for the Payment of his Debts, and the Portion of Charlotte Orme his Daughter, and for other Purposes therein mentioned.
Nether Heyford, Stow with nine Churches, and Bugbrooke (Northamptonshire) inclosures and recompense to rectors in lieu of tithes.	23 Geo. 2. c. 31 Pr.	12 April 1750
An Act for enclosing and dividing certain Common Fields and Common Grounds, called Nether Heyford Common Fields, lying and being in the Parishes of Nether Heyford, Stow with Nine Churches, and Bugbrooke, in the County of Northampton, and for extinguishing all Right of Common in certain Meadows, Pastures, and Enclosed Grounds, in the said Parishes, and providing a Recompense to the Rectors of the said Parishes, in Lieu of Tithes.
Culcheth Inclosure Act 1749	23 Geo. 2. c. 32 Pr.	12 April 1750
An Act for confirming Articles of Agreement for enclosing and dividing the Commons and Waste Grounds, within the Manor of Culcheth, in the County of Lancaster.
Securing the sole property and benefit of Israel Pownoll's dredging invention to his children for a term of years.	23 Geo. 2. c. 33 Pr.	12 April 1750
An Act for securing the sole Property, Benefit, and Advantage, of an Engine invented by Israel Pownoll, deceased, for raising Ballast, Sullage, and Sand, and for removing Banks, Shelves, and Shoals, in Rivers and Harbours, to the Children of the said Israel Pownoll, for a certain Term of Years.
Van Wylick's Naturalization Act 1749	23 Geo. 2. c. 34 Pr.	12 April 1750
An Act for naturalizing Jacob Van Wylick.

=== Sources ===
- Pickering, Danby, ed. (1765). The Statutes at Large. Vol. 20: From the 23rd to the 26th Year of King George II. Printed by J. Bentham – via Internet Archive.
- Pickering, Danby, ed. (1765). The Statutes at Large. Vol. 20: From the 23rd to the 26th Year of King George II. Printed by J. Bentham – via Google Books.
- Pickering, Danby, ed. (1765). The Statutes at Large. Vol. 20: From the 23rd to the 26th Year of King George II. C. Eyre and A. Strahan – via Internet Archive.
- Journals of the House of Commons. Vol. 25. London: His Majesty's Stationery Office. 1803. pp. 891–1116 – via Google Books.
- Chronological Table of and Index to the Statutes. Vol. 1: To the End of the Session 59 Vict. Sess. 2 (1895) (13th ed.). London: Her Majesty's Stationery Office. 1896. pp. 112–113 – via Google Books.

== See also ==
- List of acts of the Parliament of Great Britain
