= Justices Protection Act 1848 =

Act of the Parliament of the United Kingdom

Justices Protection Act 1848 (Note: The citation of this act by this short title was authorised by section 1 of, and the first schedule to, the Short Titles Act 1896. Due to the repeal of those provisions it is now authorised by section 19(2) of the Interpretation Act 1978.)
- Act of Parliament
- Parliament of the United Kingdom
- Long title: An Act to protect Justices of the Peace from Vexatious Actions for Acts done by them in Execution of their Office.
- Citation: 11 & 12 Vict. c. 44
- Territorial extent: England and Wales (Note: Section 15.)

Dates
- Royal assent: 14 August 1848
- Commencement: 2 October 1848 (Note: Section 16.)
- Repealed: 6 March 1980
Other legislation
| Amends | Public Officers Protection Act 1623; Constables Protection Act 1750 |
| Repeals/revokes | Public Officers Protection Act 1609; Justices Protection Act 1803 |
| Amended by | Statute Law Revision Act 1875; Public Authorities Protection Act 1893; Statute Law Revision Act 1950 |
| Repealed by | Justices of the Peace Act 1979 |
| Relates to | Courts Act 2003 |

Status: Repealed

Text of statute as originally enacted

The Justices Protection Act 1848 (11 & 12 Vict. c. 44) was an act of the Parliament of the United Kingdom that gave justices of the peace in England and Wales immunity from civil actions arising from their adjudication.

The act was sponsored and drafted by John Jervis and was one of the so-called Jervis Acts of 1848.

== Background ==
Prior to the act, justices of the peace (magistrates) were hampered in their functions by the risk of prosecution or civil action for decisions they had taken in the execution of their official functions. An individual disgruntled at a decision could mount a de facto challenge by bringing a civil claim against a justice and even achieve a rehearing of his case. Claims against justices for damages, through writs of certiorari, for exceeding their jurisdiction were particularly common. The courts did, however, take any opportunity to interpret the law narrowly so as to exclude the challenges, as for example in the Bumboat case, and Sheridan has doubted whether there was really an extensive problem.

Sir John Jervis was Attorney General and shared the widespread view that the law as to justices was archaic and in need in reform. Further, Justices were becoming increasingly important with the rise of criminal legislation. The act was one of the three Jervis Acts, the other two being the Summary Jurisdiction Act 1848 (11 & 12 Vict. c. 43) and Indictable Offences Act 1848.

== Provisions ==
The long title of the act was:

An Act to protect Justices of the Peace from Vexatious Actions for Acts done by them in Execution of their Office.

The act, for the first time in England and Wales, drew a distinction between unlawful acts of justices within their jurisdiction and acts unlawful because performed outside the justice's jurisdiction. Claims could only be brought for actions within jurisdiction if there was an allegation that the action was malicious and without reasonable and probable cause.

== Subsequent developments ==
Section 10 to "Provided always that." and sections 11, 12, and 14 of the act were repealed by section 2 of, and the schedule to, the Public Authorities Protection Act 1893 (56 & 57 Vict. c. 61), which came into force on 1 January 1894.

Section 18 of the act was repealed by section 1(1) of, and the first schedule to, the Statute Law Revision Act 1950 (14 Geo. 6. c. 6), which came into force on 23 May 1950.

The whole act was repealed by the Justices of the Peace Act 1979, which came into force on 6 March 1980.

The law is now contained in sections 31–33 of the Courts Act 2003.

== Related legislation ==
The Constables Protection Act 1750 (24 Geo. 2. c. 44) already gave constables "and other officers" protection from being sued for carrying out the orders of the courts.

== Bibliography ==
- Cornish, W.; Clarke, G. (1989). Law and Society in England 1750-1950. London: Sweet & Maxwell. pp. 32–33. ISBN 0-421-31150-9.
- Getzler, J. S. (2004) "Jervis, Sir John (1802–1856)", Oxford Dictionary of National Biography, Oxford University Press, accessed 4 July 2007 (subscription, Wikipedia Library access or UK public library membership required)
- Freestone, D.; Richardson, J. C. (1980). "The making of English criminal law (7): Sir John Jervis and his acts". Criminal Law Review: 5–16.
- Sheridan, L. A. (1951). "Protection of Justices". Modern Law Review. 14 (3): 267–278. doi:10.1111/j.1468-2230.1951.tb00206.x.
- Thompson, D. (1958). "Judicial immunity and the protection of Justices". Modern Law Review. 21 (5): 517–533. doi:10.1111/j.1468-2230.1958.tb00491.x.
