= Uniformity of Worship Act 1749 =

Act of the Parliament of Great Britain

- Act of Parliament
- Parliament of Great Britain
- Long title: An Act to explain Part of an Act passed in the thirteenth and fourteenth Years of the Reign of King Charles the Second, for the Uniformity of Public Prayers, and Administration of Sacraments; and also Part of an Act passed in the thirteenth Year of the Reign of Queen Elizabeth, for the Ministers of the Church to be of sound Religion.
- Citation: 23 Geo. 2. c. 28
- Territorial extent: Great Britain

Dates
- Royal assent: 12 April 1750
- Commencement: 16 November 1749 (Note: Start of session.)
- Repealed: 5 July 1865
Other legislation
Amends	Ordination of Ministers Act 1571; Act of Uniformity 1662
Repealed by	Clerical Subscription Act 1865

Status: Repealed

Text of statute as originally enacted

The Uniformity of Worship Act 1749 (23 Geo. 2. c. 28) was an act of the Parliament of Great Britain passed during the reign of George II. Its full title was "An Act to explain Part of an Act passed in the thirteenth and fourteenth Years of the Reign of King Charles the Second, for the Uniformity of Public Prayers, and Administration of Sacraments; and also Part of an Act passed in the thirteenth Year of the Reign of Queen Elizabeth, for the Ministers of the Church to be of sound Religion".

== Subsequent developments ==
The whole act was repealed by section 15 of, and the schedule to, the Clerical Subscription Act 1865 (28 & 29 Vict. c. 122).
