= Fulham Roads Act 1730 =

Act of the Parliament of Great Britain

- Act of Parliament
- Parliament of Great Britain
- Long title: An Act for repairing the Road leading from the Town of Fulham, in the County of Middlesex, through Fulham Fields, to the great Road near the Pound at Hammersmith, in the said County.
- Citation: 4 Geo. 2. c. 34
- Territorial extent: Great Britain

Dates
- Royal assent: 7 May 1731
- Commencement: 20 May 1731 (Note: Section 1.)
- Expired: 19 May 1752
- Repealed: 31 January 2013
Other legislation
Amended by	Fulham Roads Act 1749
Repealed by	Statute Law (Repeals) Act 2013
Relates to	Kensington, Chelsea and Fulham Roads (Tolls) Act 1725; Kensington, Chelsea and Fulham Roads (Toll Continuance) Act 1740; Streets (London) Act 1766

Status: Repealed

Text of statute as originally enacted

The Fulham Roads Act 1730 (4 Geo. 2. c. 34) was an act of the Parliament of Great Britain authorising the charging of tolls at turnpikes along specified roads in the parish of Fulham in the county of Middlesex.

The toll granted by the act took place on 20 May 1731 for a term of 21 years, with authority to charge tolls to expire no later than 19 May 1752. The toll was extended for an additional 21 years from expiry by the Fulham Roads Act 1749.

The act became obsolete in May 1773 when the continuation of the act came to an end. The act was repealed by the Statute Law (Repeals) Act 2013 which had been recommended by the Law Commission.

== Background ==
Prior to the late 19th century, Britain lacked a national framework for highway maintenance. The responsibility for road upkeep primarily fell on the local population through two main systems:

- Statute labour: for much of the 17th, 18th and 19th centuries, every able-bodied man to contribute six days of unpaid labour annually to repair local roads.
- Turnpikes: introduced in 1663, toll-gates placed across roads, requiring travellers to pay a fee for passage, with the collected revenue was then used for road repair and maintenance.

The road leading from Fulham through Fulham Fields to the great road near the pound at Hammersmith had become poorly maintained especially in winter, requiring repair.

== Provisions ==
The act provided:

- Appointment of Trustees to carry out the Act with power to erect turnpikes along the road.
- Trustees authorised to charge tolls for using the road; penalties for avoiding the toll; exemptions from tolls.
- Trustees authorised to appoint toll collectors and surveyors; accounting for the tolls; power of surveyors to repair the road, remove obstructions and construct drains and ditches.
- Trustees authorised to borrow using the tolls as security; continuing liabilities on individuals to repair the road.
- The tolls imposed by the Act were to continue for 21 years from 20 May 1731 (i.e. until 19 May 1752).
- Appointment of replacement Trustees; meetings of the Trustees; civil procedure issues; status of the Act.

== Subsequent developments ==
Under the terms of the act, the authority to charge tolls was to expire no later than 31 May 1747. The 19th Statute Law Repeals Report of the Law Commission recommend repealing the act, as well as the Fulham Roads Act 1749 (23 Geo. 2. c. 10):

"Under the terms of the 1749 Act, both Acts were to expire on or before May 1773. It follows that neither Act has served any useful purpose for about 240 years, and their formal repeal is now proposed on that basis."

The whole act was repealed by section 1 of, and the group 2 of part 6 of the schedule to, the Statute Law (Repeals) Act 2013, which came into force on 31 January 2013.
