= Landlord and Tenant Act 1730 =

Act of the Parliament of Great Britain

Landlord and Tenant Act 1730 (Note: The citation of this act by this short title was authorised by section 1 of, and the first schedule to, the Short Titles Act 1896. Due to the repeal of those provisions it is now authorised by section 19(2) of the Interpretation Act 1978.)
- Act of Parliament
- Parliament of Great Britain
- Long title: An Act for the more effectual preventing Frauds committed by Tenants, and for the more easy Recovery of Rents, and Renewal of Leases.
- Citation: 4 Geo. 2. c. 28
- Territorial extent: England and Wales (Note: Section 7.)

Dates
- Royal assent: 7 May 1731
- Commencement: 24 June 1731 (Note: Section 1.)
Other legislation
Amended by	Statute Law Revision Act 1867; Law of Property Act 1925; Statute Law Revision Act 1948; Tribunals, Courts and Enforcement Act 2007

Status: Amended

Text of statute as originally enacted

Revised text of statute as amended

Text of the Landlord and Tenant Act 1730 as in force today (including any amendments) within the United Kingdom, from legislation.gov.uk.

The Landlord and Tenant Act 1730 (4 Geo. 2. c. 28) is an act of the Parliament of Great Britain that regulates certain aspects of the relationship between tenants and their landlords.

The short title of the act is sometimes abbreviated to LTA 1730.

It has been held that this act and the Distress for Rent Act 1737 (11 Geo. 2. c. 19) are to be read as one.

Sections 1 to 5 and 7 of the Irish act 11 Anne c. 2 (I) (1712), sometimes called the Distress for Rent (Ireland) Act 1712 or the Distress for Rent Act (Ireland) 1712 corresponded to sections 1 to 5 of the Landlord and Tenant Act 1730.

== Section 1 ==
In this section, the words from "whereunto the defendant" to the end were repealed by section 1 of, and the first schedule to, the Statute Law Revision Act 1948 (11 & 12 Geo. 6. c. 62).

== Sections 2 to 4 ==
These sections were repealed by section 1 of, and the schedule to, the Statute Law Revision Act 1867 (30 & 31 Vict. c. 59), because they had been virtually repealed by sections 210 to 212 of the Common Law Procedure Act 1852 (15 & 16 Vict. c. 76).

== Section 5 ==
This section was repealed by sections 86 and 146 of, and paragraph 3 of schedule 14 to, and part 4 of schedule 23 to, the Tribunals, Courts and Enforcement Act 2007.

Section 7 of the act 11 Anne c. 2 (I) corresponded to this section.

== Section 6 ==
Section 6 of the act was repealed by section 207 of, and the seventh schedule to the Law of Property Act 1925 (15 & 16 Geo. 5. c. 20).

== Section 7 ==
This section provides that the act does not extend to Scotland.
