= Constables Protection Act 1750 =

Act of the Parliament of Great Britain

Constables Protection Act 1750 (Note: The citation of this act by this short title was authorised by section 1 of, and the first schedule to, the Short Titles Act 1896. Due to the repeal of those provisions it is now authorised by section 19(2) of the Interpretation Act 1978.)
- Act of Parliament
- Parliament of Great Britain
- Long title: An Act for the rendering Justices of the Peace more safe in the Execution of their Office; and for indemnifying Constables and others acting in obedience to their Warrants.
- Citation: 24 Geo. 2. c. 44
- Territorial extent: Great Britain

Dates
- Royal assent: 25 June 1751
- Commencement: 17 January 1751 (Note: Start of session.)
Other legislation
Amended by	Factory Act 1844; Justices Protection Act 1848; Statute Law Revision Act 1948

Status: Amended

Text of statute as originally enacted

Revised text of statute as amended

Text of the Constables Protection Act 1750 as in force today (including any amendments) within the United Kingdom, from legislation.gov.uk.

The Constables Protection Act 1750 (24 Geo. 2. c. 44) is an act of the Parliament of Great Britain that gives "constables ... and other officers" protection from being sued for carrying out the orders of a justice of the peace.

Justices themselves have immunity from being sued for their own actions under sections 31 to 33 of the Courts Act 2003, except if they have acted outside their jurisdiction and in bad faith.
