= Ordination of Ministers Act 1571 =

Act of the Parliament of England

Ordination of Ministers Act 1571 (Note: The citation of this act by this short title was authorised by section 5 of, and the second schedule to, the Statute Law Revision Act 1948. Due to the repeal of those provisions, it is now authorised by section 19(2) of the Interpretation Act 1978.)
- Act of Parliament
- Parliament of England
- Long title: An Acte to refourme certayne Dysorders touching Ministers of the Churche. (Note: These words are printed against this act in the second column of the second schedule to the Statute Law Revision Act 1948, which is headed "Title".)
- Citation: 13 Eliz. 1. c. 12
- Territorial extent: England and Wales; Northern Ireland

Dates
- Royal assent: 29 May 1571
- Commencement: 2 April 1571 (Note: Start of session.)
- Repealed: Northern Ireland: 18 December 1953; England and Wales: 1 January 1970
Other legislation
Amended by	Uniformity of Worship Act 1749
Repealed by	Northern Ireland: Statute Law Revision Act 1953; England and Wales: Statute Law Revision Act 1863, Clerical Subscription Act 1865, Statute Law Revision Act 1948, Ecclesiastical Jurisdiction Measure 1963 and Statute Law (Repeals) Act 1969
Relates to	Maintenance of Church of England Act 1706

Status: Repealed

Text of statute as originally enacted

The Ordination of Ministers Act 1571 (13 Eliz. 1. c. 12) was an act of the Parliament of England that required clergy of the Church of England to subscribe to the Thirty-Nine Articles of Religion.

== Text ==
That the churches of the queen's majesty's dominions may be served with pastors of sound religion, be it enacted by the authority of this present Parliament, that every person under the degree of a bishop, which does or shall pretend to be a priest or minister of God's holy word and sacraments, by reason of any other form of institution, consecration, or ordering, than the form set forth by Parliament in the time of the late king of most worthy memory, King Edward VI, or now used in the reign of our most gracious sovereign lady, before the feast of the Nativity of Christ next following, shall in the presence of the bishop or guardian of the spiritualities of some one diocese where he has or shall have ecclesiastical living, declare his assent, and subscribe to all the articles of religion, which only concern the confession of the true Christian faith and the doctrine of the sacraments, comprised in a book imprinted, intituled: Articles, whereupon it was agreed by the archbishops and bishops of both provinces, and the whole clergy in the Convocation holden at London in the year of our Lord God one thousand five hundred sixty and two, according to the computation of the Church of England, for the avoiding of the diversities of opinions, and for the establishing of consent touching true religion put forth by the queen's authority; and shall bring from such bishop or guardian of spiritualities, in writing, under his seal authentic, a testimonial of such assent and subscription; and openly, on some Sunday, in the time of the public service afore noon, in every church where by reason of any ecclesiastical living he ought to attend, read both the said testimonial and the said Articles; upon pain that every such person which shall not before the said feast do as is above appointed, shall be ipso facto deprived, and all his ecclesiastical promotions shall be void, as if he then were naturally dead.

And that if any person ecclesiastical, or which shall have ecclesiastical living, shall advisedly maintain or affirm any doctrine directly contrary or repugnant to any of the said Articles, and being convented before the bishop of the diocese or the ordinary, or before the queen's highness's commissioners in causes ecclesiastical, shall persist therein, or not revoke his error, or after such revocation eftsoon affirm such untrue doctrine, such maintaining or affirming and persisting, or such eftsoon affirming, shall be just cause to deprive such person of his ecclesiastical promotions; and it shall be lawful to the bishop of the diocese or the ordinary, or the said commissioners, to deprive such person so persisting, or lawfully convicted of such eftsoons affirming, and upon such sentence of deprivation pronounced he shall be indeed deprived.

And that no person shall hereafter be admitted to any benefice with cure, except he then be of the age of three and twenty years at the least and a deacon, and shall first have subscribed the said Articles in presence of the ordinary, and publicly read the same in the parish church of that benefice, with declaration of his unfeigned assent to the same: and that every person after the end of this session of Parliament, to be admitted to a benefice with cure, except that within two months after his induction he do publicly read the said Articles in the same church whereof he shall have cure, in the time of common prayer there, with declaration of his unfeigned assent thereunto, and be admitted to minister the sacraments within one year after his induction, if he be not so admitted before, shall be upon every such default, ipso facto, immediately deprived.

And that no person now permitted, by any dispensation or otherwise, shall retain any benefice with cure, being under the age of one and twenty years, or not being deacon at the least, or which shall not be admitted as is aforesaid, within one year next after the making of this Act, or within six months after he shall accomplish the age of four and twenty years, on pain that such his dispensation shall be merely void.

And that none shall be made minister, or admitted to preach or administer the sacraments, being under the age of four and twenty years; nor unless he first bring to the bishop of that diocese, from men known to the bishop to be of sound religion, a testimonial both of his honest life and of his professing the doctrine expressed in the said Articles; nor unless he be able to answer and render to the ordinary an account of his faith, in Latin according to the said Articles, or have special gift and ability to be a preacher; nor shall be admitted to the order of deacon or ministry, unless he shall first subscribe to the said Articles.

And that none hereafter shall be admitted to any benefice with cure, of or above the value of thirty pounds yearly in the queen's books, unless he shall then be a bachelor of divinity, or a preacher lawfully allowed by some bishop within this realm, or by one of the universities of Cambridge or Oxford.

And that all admissions to benefices, institutions, and inductions, to be made of any person contrary to the form or any provision of this Act, and all tolerations, dispensations, qualifications, and licences whatsoever to be made to the contrary hereof, shall be merely void in law, as if they never were.

Provided always, that no title to confer or present by lapse, shall accrue upon any deprivation ipso facto, but after six months after notice of such deprivation given by the ordinary to the patron.

== Subsequent developments ==
Section 1 of the act was repealed by section 1 of, and the schedule to, the Statute Law Revision Act 1863 (26 & 27 Vict. c. 125).

Section 1, and section 3 of from "And that no pson nowe" to the end, of the act were repealed by section 1 of, and the schedule to, the Statute Law Revision Act 1863 (26 & 27 Vict. c. 125), which came into force on 28 July 1863.

Section 3 of the act, except the words "No Person shall hereafter be admitted to any Benefice with Cure, except he then be of the Age of Three-and-twenty Years at least, and a Deacon" was, and all enactments amending, confirming or continuing the same were, repealed by section 15 of, and the Schedule to, the Clerical Subscription Act 1865 (28 & 29 Vict. c. 122).

"So much of section Five as provides that no one shall be admitted to the Order of Deacon or Ministry unless he shall first subscribe to the said articles" was, and all enactments amending, confirming or continuing the same were, repealed by section 15 of, and the Schedule to, the Clerical Subscription Act 1865 (28 & 29 Vict. c. 122). The third revised edition of the statutes has this as part of section 4 of the Ordination of Ministers Act 1571.

In section 2 of the act, the words from "or before" to "causes ecclesiasticall" and the words "or the said commissioners", in section 4 of the act, the words "being under thage of foure and twenty yeres, nor", and section 5 of the act, was repealed by section 1 of, and the first schedule to, the Statute Law Revision Act 1948 (11 & 12 Geo. 6. c. 62), which came into force on 30 July 1948.

The whole act was repealed for Northern Ireland by section 1 of, and the first schedule to, the Statute Law Revision Act 1953 (2 & 3 Eliz. 2. c. 5), which came into force on 18 December 1953.

Section 2 of the act was repealed by section 87 of, and the fifth schedule to, the Ecclesiastical Jurisdiction Measure 1963 (No. 1), which came into force on 1 March 1965.

Section 4 of the act was repealed by section 1(2) of the Clergy (Ordination and Miscellaneous Provisions) Measure 1964 (No. 6).

The whole act, so far as unrepealed, was repealed by section 1 of, and part II of the schedule to, the Statute Law (Repeals) Act 1969, which came into force on 1 January 1970.
