= List of acts of the Parliament of Great Britain from 1730 =

This is a complete list of acts of the Parliament of Great Britain for the year 1730.

For acts passed until 1707, see the list of acts of the Parliament of England and the list of acts of the Parliament of Scotland. See also the list of acts of the Parliament of Ireland.

For acts passed from 1801 onwards, see the list of acts of the Parliament of the United Kingdom. For acts of the devolved parliaments and assemblies in the United Kingdom, see the list of acts of the Scottish Parliament, the list of acts of the Northern Ireland Assembly, and the list of acts and measures of Senedd Cymru; see also the list of acts of the Parliament of Northern Ireland.

The number shown after each act's title is its chapter number. Acts are cited using this number, preceded by the year(s) of the reign during which the relevant parliamentary session was held; thus the Union with Ireland Act 1800 is cited as "39 & 40 Geo. 3. c. 67", meaning the 67th act passed during the session that started in the 39th year of the reign of George III and which finished in the 40th year of that reign. Note that the modern convention is to use Arabic numerals in citations (thus "41 Geo. 3" rather than "41 Geo. III"). Acts of the last session of the Parliament of Great Britain and the first session of the Parliament of the United Kingdom are both cited as "41 Geo. 3".

Acts passed by the Parliament of Great Britain did not have a short title; however, some of these acts have subsequently been given a short title by acts of the Parliament of the United Kingdom (such as the Short Titles Act 1896).

Before the Acts of Parliament (Commencement) Act 1793 came into force on 8 April 1793, acts passed by the Parliament of Great Britain were deemed to have come into effect on the first day of the session in which they were passed. Because of this, the years given in the list below may in fact be the year before a particular act was passed.

== 4 Geo. 2 ==
The fourth session of the 7th Parliament of Great Britain, which met from 21 January 1731 until 7 May 1731.

This session was also traditionally cited as 4 G. 2.

=== Public acts ===
Short title	Citation	Royal assent
Long title
Taxation Act 1730 (repealed)	4 Geo. 2. c. 1	19 February 1731
An Act for continuing the Duties upon Malt, Mum, Cyder, and Perry, in that Part of Great Britain called England; and for granting to His Majesty certain Duties upon Malt, Mum, Cyder, and Perry, in that Part of Great Britain called Scotland, for the Service of the Year One Thousand Seven Hundred and Thirty-one. (Repealed by Statute Law Revision Act 1867 (30 & 31 Vict. c. 59))
Mutiny Act 1730 (repealed)	4 Geo. 2. c. 2	24 March 1731
An Act for punishing Mutiny and Desertion; and for the better Payment of the Army and their Quarters. (Repealed by Statute Law Revision Act 1867 (30 & 31 Vict. c. 59))
Cheshire Roads Act 1730 (repealed)	4 Geo. 2. c. 3	24 March 1731
An Act for repairing the Roads leading from the most Southern Part of Butt Lane, (Note: Butt Lane in north Staffordshire. 53°04′53″N 2°15′43″W) in the Parish of Lawton, in the County Palatine of Chester, to Lawton; and from thence to Henshal's Smithy, upon Cranage Green, (Note: Cranage in Cheshire. 53°13′33″N 2°22′53″W) in the said County. (Repealed by Roads to and from Lawton (Cheshire) Act 1820 (1 Geo. 4. c. xxxviii))
Land Tax Act 1730 (repealed)	4 Geo. 2. c. 4	9 April 1731
An Act for granting an Aid to His Majesty, by a Land Tax, to be raised in Great Britain, for the Service of the Year One Thousand Seven Hundred and Thirty-one. (Repealed by Statute Law Revision Act 1867 (30 & 31 Vict. c. 59))
National Debt Act 1730 (repealed)	4 Geo. 2. c. 5	9 April 1731
An Act for the further Application of the Sinking Fund, by paying off One Million of South Sea Annuities. (Repealed by Statute Law Revision Act 1870 (33 & 34 Vict. c. 69))
Indemnity Act 1730 (repealed)	4 Geo. 2. c. 6	9 April 1731
An Act to indemnify Persons, who, through Ignorance of Law, have omitted to qualify themselves for Imployments or Offices, by taking the Oaths, and making and subscribing the Declaration against Transubstantiation, and receiving the Sacriment; and Members of Corporations who have neglected to take the Oaths of Office; and Persons who have not read the Common Prayer, and declared their Assent and Consent to the same, according to Law, upon the Terms therein mentioned. (Repealed by Statute Law Revision Act 1867 (30 & 31 Vict. c. 59))
Juries Act 1730 (repealed)	4 Geo. 2. c. 7	9 April 1731
An Act to explain and amend an Act, made in the Third Year of His Majesty's Reign, intituled, "An Act for the better Regulation of Juries," (Note: Juries Act 1729 (3 Geo. 2. c. 25)) so far as the same relates to the County of Middlesex. (Repealed by Juries Act 1825 (6 Geo. 4. c. 50))
Surrey and Sussex Roads Act 1730 (repealed)	4 Geo. 2. c. 8	9 April 1731
An Act for the more effectual repairing the Road leading from Godstone, in the County of Surrey, to Highgate, at the Entrance into Ashdown Forest, in the Parish of East Grinsted, in the County of Sussex. (Repealed by Road from Godstone to Highgate (Sussex) Act 1828 (9 Geo. 4. c. cx))
National Debt (No. 2) Act 1730 (repealed)	4 Geo. 2. c. 9	7 May 1731
An Act for raising One Million Two Hundred Thousand Pounds, by Annuities and a Lottery, in Manner therein mentioned; and for appropriating the Supplies granted in this Session of Parliament; and for making forth Duplicates of Exchequer Bills, Lottery Tickets, and Orders, lost, burnt, or otherwise destroyed. (Repealed by Statute Law Revision Act 1870 (33 & 34 Vict. c. 69))
Lunatics Act 1730 (repealed)	4 Geo. 2. c. 10	7 May 1731
An Act to enable Idiots and Lunatics, who are seised or possessed of Estates in Fee, or for Lives or Terms of Years, in Trust, or by Way of Mortgage, to make Conveyances, Surrenders, or Assignments, of such Estates. (Repealed by Infants, Lunatics, etc. Act 1825 (6 Geo. 4. c. 74))
Dundee Beer Duties Act 1730 (repealed)	4 Geo. 2. c. 11	7 May 1731
An Act for continuing the Duty of Two Pennies Scots, or One Sixth Part of a Penny Sterling, upon every Pint of Ale and Beer that shall be vended or sold within the Town of Dundee, and Privileges thereof, for paying the public Debts of the said Town, repairing the Harbour there, and for other Purposes therein mentioned. (Repealed by Statute Law Revision Act 1948 (11 & 12 Geo. 6. c. 62))
Coinage Duties Act 1730 (repealed)	4 Geo. 2. c. 12	7 May 1731
An Act to continue the Duties for Encouragement of the Coinage of Money. (Repealed by Statute Law Revision Act 1867 (30 & 31 Vict. c. 59))
Aberdeen Beer Duties Act 1730 (repealed)	4 Geo. 2. c. 13	7 May 1731
An Act for the further continuing the Duties granted by an Act passed in the Parliament of Scotland, in the Year One Thousand Six Hundred and Ninety-five, (Note: Aberdeen Beer Duties Act 1695 (c. 60 (S))) and continued by an Act passed in the Year One Thousand Seven Hundred and Seven, (Note: Aberdeen Beer Duties Act 1707 (c. 81 (S))) for paying off the Debts of the Town of Aberdeen, and for other public Uses of the said Town. (Repealed by Statute Law Revision Act 1948 (11 & 12 Geo. 6. c. 62))
Adulteration of Tea Act 1730 (repealed)	4 Geo. 2. c. 14	7 May 1731
An Act to prevent Frauds in the Revenue of Excise, with respect to Starch, Coffee, Tea, and Chocolate. (Repealed by Statute Law Revision Act 1958 (6 & 7 Eliz. 2. c. 46))
Importation Act 1730 (repealed)	4 Geo. 2. c. 15	7 May 1731
An Act for importing from His Majesty's Plantations in America, directly into Ireland, Goods not enumerated in any Act of Parliament. (Repealed by Statute Law Revision Act 1867 (30 & 31 Vict. c. 59))
Stealing from Bleaching Grounds Act 1730 (repealed)	4 Geo. 2. c. 16	7 May 1731
An Act to prevent the stealing of Linen, Fustian, and Cotton Goods and Wares, from Fields, Grounds, and other Places used for whitening, bleaching, or drying, the same. (Repealed by Stealing from Bleaching Grounds Act 1744 (18 Geo. 2. c. 27))
Newhaven Harbour Act 1730 (repealed)	4 Geo. 2. c. 17	7 May 1731
An Act for repairing and keeping in Repair the Pier or Piers and Harbour of Newhaven, in the County of Sussex. (Repealed by Newhaven Harbour and Ouse Harbour Navigation Act 1847 (10 & 11 Vict. c. ix))
Mediterranean Passes Act 1730 (repealed)	4 Geo. 2. c. 18	7 May 1731
An Act to prevent counterfeiting the Passes commonly called Mediterranean Passes. (Repealed by Statute Law Revision Act 1867 (30 & 31 Vict. c. 59))
Ilfracombe Harbour Act 1730 (repealed)	4 Geo. 2. c. 19	7 May 1731
An Act for repairing and keeping in repair the Pier and Harbour of Ilfordcombe, in the County of Devon. (Repealed by Pier and Harbour Orders Confirmation (No. 1) Act 1870 (33 & 34 Vict. c. lxxxii))
Church at Gravesend Act 1730	4 Geo. 2. c. 20	7 May 1731
An Act for re-building the Parish Church of Gravesend, in the County of Kent, as One of the Fifty New Churches directed to be built by Two Acts of Parliament, One made in the Ninth, (Note: New Churches in London and Westminster Act 1710 (9 Ann. c. 17)) and the other in the Tenth, (Note: Churches in London and Westminster Act 1711 (10 Ann. c. 20)) Year of the Reign of Her late Majesty Queen Anne.
British Nationality Act 1730 (repealed)	4 Geo. 2. c. 21	7 May 1731
An Act to explain a Clause in an Act made in the Seventh Year of the Reign of Her late Majesty Queen Anne (for naturalizing Foreign Protestants), (Note: Foreign Protestants Naturalization Act 1708 (7 Ann. c. 5)) which relates to the Children of the natural-born Subjects of the Crown of England, or of Great Britain. (Repealed by British Nationality and Status of Aliens Act 1914 (4 & 5 Geo. 5. c. 17))
Bristol Roads Act 1730 (repealed)	4 Geo. 2. c. 22	7 May 1731
An Act to explain and amend an Act passed in the Thirteenth Year of His late Majesty's Reign, intituled, "An Act for amending the several Roads leading from the City of Bristol." (Note: Bristol Roads Act 1726 (13 Geo. 1. c. 12)) (Repealed by Bristol Roads Act 1779 (19 Geo. 3. c. 117))
Oxford and Gloucester Roads Act 1730 (repealed)	4 Geo. 2. c. 23	7 May 1731
An Act for repairing the Road leading from Chappel on the Heath, in the County of Oxon, to the Quarry above Bourton on the Hill, in the County of Gloucester. (Repealed by Statute Law (Repeals) Act 2013 (c. 2))
Thames Watermen Act 1730 (repealed)	4 Geo. 2. c. 24	7 May 1731
An Act to explain and amend a Clause in an Act passed in the Second Year of His Majesty's Reign (for making more effectual several Acts relating to Watermen, Wherrymen, and Lightermen, rowing on the River Thames), (Note: Thames Watermen Act 1728 (2 Geo. 2. c. 26)) so far as the same relates to Ferry Boats and flat-bottomed Boats. (Repealed by Thames Watermen and Lightermen Act 1827 (7 & 8 Geo. 4. c. lxxv))
Worcester (Poor Relief, Burial Ground and Hopmarket) Act 1730	4 Geo. 2. c. 25	7 May 1731
An Act for confirming an Agreement lately entered into, between the Mayor, Aldermen, and Citizens, of the City of Worcester, and the Guardians of the Poor of the said City, for continuing the Hop-market of the said City in the Work-house there; and for vesting the Right of the said Mayor, Aldermen, and Citizens, of keeping a Hop-market in the said City, in the Guardians of the Poor of the said City, and their Successors for ever.
Proceedings in Courts of Justice Act 1730 (repealed)	4 Geo. 2. c. 26	7 May 1731
An Act that all Proceedings in Courts of Justice within that Part of Great Britain called England, and the Court of Exchequer in Scotland, shall be in the English Language. (Repealed by Civil Procedure Acts Repeal Act 1879 (42 & 43 Vict. c. 59))
Manufacture of Sail Cloth Act 1730 (repealed)	4 Geo. 2. c. 27	7 May 1731
An Act for further encouraging the Manufacture of British Sail Cloth, by taking off the Duties and Drawbacks therein mentioned, and allowing an additional Bounty on British made Sail Cloth exported; and for stamping British made Sail Cloth with the Name and Place of Abode of the Maker. (Repealed by Statute Law Revision Act 1867 (30 & 31 Vict. c. 59))
Landlord and Tenant Act 1730	4 Geo. 2. c. 28	7 May 1731
An Act for the more effectual preventing Frauds committed by Tenants; and for the more easy Recovery of Rents, and Renewal of Leases.
Exportation Act 1730 (repealed)	4 Geo. 2. c. 29	7 May 1731
An Act for granting an Allowance upon the Exportation of British made Gunpowder. (Repealed by Statute Law Revision Act 1867 (30 & 31 Vict. c. 59))
Coal Trade Act 1730 (repealed)	4 Geo. 2. c. 30	7 May 1731
An Act for rendering more effectual an Act made in the Third Year of His Majesty's Reign, intituled, "An Act for the better Regulation of the Coal Trade," (Note: Coal Trade Act 1729 (3 Geo. 2. c. 26)) so far as the same relates to the preventing the enhancing the Price of Coals in the River Thames, by the keeping of Turn in delivering of Coals there. (Repealed by Statute Law Revision Act 1867 (30 & 31 Vict. c. 59))
Wigan to Preston Road Act 1730 (repealed)	4 Geo. 2. c. 31	7 May 1731
An Act for making more effectual an Act passed in the Thirteenth Year of the Reign of His late Majesty King George the First, (Note: Wigan to Preston Road Act 1726 (13 Geo. 1. c. 9)) for repairing, widening, and amending, the Roads from Wigan to Preston, in the County of Lancaster. (Repealed by Wigan to Preston Road Act 1779 (19 Geo. 3. c. 92))
Theft Act 1730 (repealed)	4 Geo. 2. c. 32	7 May 1731
An Act for the more effectual punishing Stealers of Lead, or Iron Bars, fixed to Houses, or any Fences belonging thereunto. (Repealed for England and Wales by Criminal Statutes Repeal Act 1827 (7 & 8 Geo. 4. c. 27), for India by Criminal Law (India) Act 1828 (9 Geo. 4. c. 74) and for Scotland and Northern Ireland by Statute Law Revision Act 1963 (c. 30))
Postage Act 1730 (repealed)	4 Geo. 2. c. 33	7 May 1731
An Act for obviating a Doubt which hath arisen, concerning the usual Allowance made upon the Delivery of Letters sent by the Penny Post, to Places out of the Cities of London and Westminster, and Borough of Southwark, and the respective Suburbs thereof. (Repealed by Post Office (Repeal of Laws) Act 1837 (7 Will. 4 & 1 Vict. c. 32))
Fulham Roads Act 1730 (repealed)	4 Geo. 2. c. 34	7 May 1731
An Act for repairing the Road leading from the Town of Fulham, in the County of Middlesex, through Fulham Fields, to the great Road near the Pound at Hammersmith, in the said County. (Repealed by Statute Law (Repeals) Act 2013 (c. 2))

=== Private acts ===
Short title	Citation	Royal assent
Long title
Enabling Edward Southwell to take the oaths in Britain and to qualify himself for the legal enjoyment of the offices of Principal Secretary of State and Keeper of the Signet and Privy Seal of Ireland.	4 Geo. 2. c. 1 Pr.	19 February 1731
An Act to enable Edward Southwell Esquire to take the Oaths in this Kingdom, and to qualify himself for the legal Enjoyment of the Offices of Principal Secretary of State, and Keeper of the Signet and Privy Seal, of the Kingdom of Ireland.
Naturalization of Philip Jacob de Neufville and Others Act 1730	4 Geo. 2. c. 2 Pr.	19 February 1731
An Act to naturalize Philip Jacob de Neusville and others.
Bishop's Tachbrook Inclosure Act 1730	4 Geo. 2. c. 3 Pr.	24 March 1731
An Act for enclosing the Common Fields and Unenclosed Lands, lying within the Manor and Parish of Bishops Tachbrooke, in the County of Warwick.
Claridge's Name Act 1730	4 Geo. 2. c. 4 Pr.	24 March 1731
An Act for enabling Richard Claridge Gentleman, and his Issue, to take and use the Surname of Turner.
De Salis's Naturalization Act 1730	4 Geo. 2. c. 5 Pr.	24 March 1731
An Act to naturalize Hieronimus De Salis Esquire.
Godolphin's Naturalization Act 1730	4 Geo. 2. c. 6 Pr.	24 March 1731
An Act for naturalizing Catherina Godolphin, Wife of the Honourable William Godolphin Esquire, commonly called Marquis of Blandford.
De la Fontaine's Naturalization Act 1730	4 Geo. 2. c. 7 Pr.	24 March 1731
An Act to naturalize Mary Anne de la Fontaine, Wife of Charles de la Fontaine, of London, Merchant.
Vesting lands in James Duke of Chandos in pursuance of an agreement made on his son Henry Marquis of Caernarvon's marriage.	4 Geo. 2. c. 8 Pr.	9 April 1731
An Act for vesting several Manors, Lands, and Hereditaments, therein mentioned, in James Duke of Chandos and his Heirs, in Pursuance of certain Articles of Agreement made on the Marriage of his Son Henry Bridges Esquire, commonly called Marquis of Carnarvon
Nuneaton and Attleborough (Warwickshire) Inclosures Act 1730	4 Geo. 2. c. 9 Pr.	9 April 1731
An Act for enclosing and dividing the Common Fields and Common Grounds, in the Manor of Nuneaton and Attleborough, in the County of Warwick.
Prestbury Inclosure Act 1730	4 Geo. 2. c. 10 Pr.	9 April 1731
An Act for exchanging, dividing, and enclosing, the Common Fields, Common Meadows, and Common and Waste Grounds, within the Manor of Prestbury, in the County of Gloucester.
Shafto's Estate Act 1730	4 Geo. 2. c. 11 Pr.	9 April 1731
An Act to enable John Shafto Esquire to make a suitable Settlement upon any Woman he shall marry, and Provision for Younger Children.
Clayton's Estate Act 1730	4 Geo. 2. c. 12 Pr.	9 April 1731
An Act for the Sale of the Estate late of Mary Clayton deceased, in the County of Bucks (entailed by her Will), for Payment of her Debts and Legacies charged thereon; and for laying out the Overplus of the Monies arising by such Sale in the Purchase of other Lands, to be settled to the same Uses.
Naturalization of Isaac Lacam, Peter Korten and others.	4 Geo. 2. c. 13 Pr.	9 April 1731
An Act for naturalizing Isaac Lacam, Peter Korten, and others.
Duke of Grafton's Estate Act 1730	4 Geo. 2. c. 14 Pr.	7 May 1731
An Act for Sale of the Estate of Charles Duke of Grafton, in the County of Surrey; and to settle other Lands in Lieu thereof.
Thomas Taylor's and Maurice Shelton's estates: sale of lands in Suffolk and settling others.	4 Geo. 2. c. 15 Pr.	7 May 1731
An Act for enabling the Sale of several Lands and Hereditaments of Thomas Taylor and Maurace Shelton Esquires, in the County of Suffolk; and for settling other Lands, of as great Yearly Value, to the same Uses.
Making divisions, inclosures and allotments in Catwick (Yorkshire) and establishing a yearly payment to the rector there in lieu of tithes.	4 Geo. 2. c. 16 Pr.	7 May 1731
An Act for making Divisions, Enclosures, and Allotments, of the Open Corn Fields and Pastures, in the Lordship of Catwick, in the County of York; and for settling and establishing the Payment of a Yearly Sum to the Rector of Catwick aforesaid, and his Successors, in Lieu of Tithes, pursuant to Agreement between the present Rector and Proprietors of the said Lands.
Exchange of the parsonage house and glebe of Biscathorpe (Lincolnshire) for lands belonging to the lord of the manor and recompense to the rector in lieu of his tithes, to enable the lord of the manor to inclose the common fields.	4 Geo. 2. c. 17 Pr.	7 May 1731
An Act for exchanging the Parsonage-house and Glebe Lands in Biscathorpe, in the County of Lincoln, for other Lands belonging to the Lord of the Manor; and for giving a Recompence to the Rector, in Lieu of his Tithes, to enable the Lord of the Manor to enclose the Common Fields.
Lower and Upper Slaughter (Gloucestershire) Inclosure Act 1730	4 Geo. 2. c. 18 Pr.	7 May 1731
An Act for enclosing, dividing, and exchanging, the Common Fields and Common Grounds, in the Parishes of Lower Slaughter and Upper Slaughter, in the County of Gloucester.
Manor of West Broughton in Dovebridge (Derbyshire) Inclosure Act 1730	4 Geo. 2. c. 19 Pr.	7 May 1731
An Act for dividing and enclosing divers Parcels of Commons and Waste Grounds, lying within the Manor of Westbroughton, in the Parish of Dovebridge, in the County of Derby.
Hoskyn's Estate Act 1730	4 Geo. 2. c. 20 Pr.	7 May 1731
An Act for vesting certain Estates of Sir Hungerford Hoskyns Baronet in Trustees, to be sold, for the raising and paying his Brothers and Sisters Portions, now remaining a Charge upon his Estate, together with the Debts and Incumbrances of his Father Sir John Hoskyns, affecting the same.
Exchange of estates between Lancelot Archbishop of York and John Aislabie.	4 Geo. 2. c. 21 Pr.	7 May 1731
An Act for making and rendering effectual an Exchange of Estates therein mentioned, in the County of York, between Lancelot Lord Archbishop of York, and John Aislabie Esquire.
Enabling Frances Arundell and George Henry, Earl of Litchfield, guardian of Mary Arundell (an infant) to grant and fill up leases of estates of Mary and Frances Arundell in Cornwall and Dorset.	4 Geo. 2. c. 22 Pr.	7 May 1731
An Act to enable Frances Arundell and George Henry Earl of Litchfield, Guardian of Mary Arundell (an Infant), during the Minority of the said Mary Arundell, to grant and fill up Leases of the Estates of the said Frances and Mary Arundell, in the Counties of Cornwal and Dorset.
Exemplifying Henry Lord Herbert's will and making it evidence in all law courts in Great Britain and Ireland.	4 Geo. 2. c. 23 Pr.	7 May 1731
An Act for exemplifying the Will of Henry late Lord Herbert; and for making the same Evidence in all Courts of Law and Equity in Great Britain and Ireland.
Exemplifying Henry Bagenall's will and making it evidence in all law courts in Great Britain and Ireland.	4 Geo. 2. c. 24 Pr.	7 May 1731
An Act for exemplifying the Will of Nicholas Bagenall Esquire; and for making the same Evidence in all Courts of Law and Equity in Great Britain and Ireland, and Dominion of Wales.
Confirming agreements for exchange of lands between Edmund Halsey, deceased, and the patron and vicar of Stoke Poges (Buckinghamshire).	4 Geo. 2. c. 25 Pr.	7 May 1731
An Act for confirming an Agreement for exchanging of Lands, made between Edmund Halsey Esquire deceased, and the Patron and Vicar of Stoke Poges, in the County of Bucks.
Player's Estate Act 1730	4 Geo. 2. c. 26 Pr.	7 May 1731
An Act for selling Part of the Estate of Thomas Player Esquire, for discharging the Debts, Legacies, and Incumbrances, therein mentioned.
Standen's Estate Act 1730	4 Geo. 2. c. 27 Pr.	7 May 1731
An Act for the Sale of the Estates of Edward Standen Esquire, deceased, at Arborfield and elsewhere, for discharging the Debts of the said Edward Standen; and other Purposes therein mentioned.
Bowry's Estate Act 1730	4 Geo. 2. c. 28 Pr.	7 May 1731
An Act for vesting in Trustees the Estate of Lucy Bowry Widow and John Bowry her Son, situate in the Parishes of Edmonton and Tottenham, in the County of Middlesex, for the Sale thereof, to discharge the several Incumbrances thereupon; and for other Purposes therein mentioned.
Westby's Estate Act 1730	4 Geo. 2. c. 29 Pr.	7 May 1731
An Act for selling Part of the Estate of Robert Westby Esquire, in the County of Lancaster, for raising Money, to discharge several Debts and Incumbrances of his Father and Brother; and for other Purposes therein mentioned.
Putt's Estate Act 1730	4 Geo. 2. c. 30 Pr.	7 May 1731
An Act to enable Reymundo Putt Esquire to make and fill up Leases of the Estate late of Sir Thomas Putt Baronet, deceased, in the Counties of Devon, Dorset, and Somerset.
Vesting in John Inglis, executor of George Heriot, lands in Hampshire mortgaged in fee by Charles Bulkley to the testator, in trust for purposes mentioned.	4 Geo. 2. c. 31 Pr.	7 May 1731
An Act for vesting in John Inglis (Executor of George Heriot Clerk, deceased) certain Lands in the County of Southampton, mortgaged in Fee, by Charles Bulkley Esquire, to the Testator, in Trust, for the Purposes therein mentioned.
Kneller's Name Act 1730	4 Geo. 2. c. 32 Pr.	7 May 1731
An Act for enabling Godfrey Kneller Huckle Gentleman, and the Heirs of his Body, to take and use the Surname of Kneller.
Bardewieck's Naturalization Act 1730	4 Geo. 2. c. 33 Pr.	7 May 1731
An Act for naturalizing Erust Bardiwieck.

=== Sources ===
- Pickering, Danby, ed. (1765). The Statutes at Large. Vol. 16: From the Second to the 9th Year of King George II. Cambridge: Joseph Bentham – via Internet Archive.
- Pickering, Danby, ed. (1765). The Statutes at Large. Vol. 16: From the Second to the 9th Year of King George II. Cambridge: Joseph Bentham – via Google Books.
- Journals of the House of Commons. Vol. 21. London: His Majesty's Stationery Office. 1803. pp. 590–756 – via Google Books.
- Chronological Table of and Index to the Statutes. Vol. 1: To the End of the Session 59 Vict. Sess. 2 (1895) (13th ed.). London: Her Majesty's Stationery Office. 1896. pp. 100–101 – via Google Books.
- "Acts of the Parliament of Great Britain from 1730". legislation.gov.uk. The National Archives.

== See also ==
- List of acts of the Parliament of Great Britain
