= Richmond Chapel, Lancashire Act 1772 =

Act of the Parliament of Great Britain

- Act of Parliament
- Parliament of Great Britain
- Long title: An Act for completing a Building intended for a new Church or Chapel at Richmond, near Everton, in the County Palatine of Lancaster; and for other Purposes.
- Citation: 12 Geo. 3. c. 36
- Territorial extent: Great Britain

Dates
- Royal assent: 21 May 1772
- Commencement: 21 January 1772 (Note: Start of session.)
- Repealed: 22 July 1904
Other legislation
Repealed by	Liverpool and Wigan Churches Act 1904

Status: Repealed

Text of statute as originally enacted

The Richmond Chapel, Lancashire Act 1772 (12 Geo. 3. c. 36) was an act of the Parliament of Great Britain "for completing a Building intended for a new Church or Chapel at Richmond, Everton, in the County Palatinate of Lancashire and for other purposes."

The act enabled to finish the building of St Anne's Church as a chapel of ease in Richmond, a location near Everton, Liverpool.

== Subsequent developments ==
The whole act was repealed by section 25 of, and the second schedule to, the Liverpool and Wigan Churches Act 1904 (4 Edw. 7. c. c), which came into force on 22 July 1904.
