= List of acts of the Parliament of Great Britain from 1772 =

This is a complete list of acts of the Parliament of Great Britain for the year 1772.

For acts passed until 1707, see the list of acts of the Parliament of England and the list of acts of the Parliament of Scotland. See also the list of acts of the Parliament of Ireland.

For acts passed from 1801 onwards, see the list of acts of the Parliament of the United Kingdom. For acts of the devolved parliaments and assemblies in the United Kingdom, see the list of acts of the Scottish Parliament, the list of acts of the Northern Ireland Assembly, and the list of acts and measures of Senedd Cymru; see also the list of acts of the Parliament of Northern Ireland.

The number shown after each act's title is its chapter number. Acts are cited using this number, preceded by the year(s) of the reign during which the relevant parliamentary session was held; thus the Union with Ireland Act 1800 is cited as "39 & 40 Geo. 3. c. 67", meaning the 67th act passed during the session that started in the 39th year of the reign of George III and which finished in the 40th year of that reign. Note that the modern convention is to use Arabic numerals in citations (thus "41 Geo. 3" rather than "41 Geo. III"). Acts of the last session of the Parliament of Great Britain and the first session of the Parliament of the United Kingdom are both cited as "41 Geo. 3".

Acts passed by the Parliament of Great Britain did not have a short title; however, some of these acts have subsequently been given a short title by acts of the Parliament of the United Kingdom (such as the Short Titles Act 1896).

Before the Acts of Parliament (Commencement) Act 1793 came into force on 8 April 1793, acts passed by the Parliament of Great Britain were deemed to have come into effect on the first day of the session in which they were passed. Because of this, the years given in the list below may in fact be the year before a particular act was passed.

== 12 Geo. 3 ==
The fifth session of the 13th Parliament of Great Britain, which met from 21 January 1772 until 9 June 1772.

This session was also traditionally cited as 12 G. 3.

=== Public acts ===
Short title	Citation	Royal assent
Long title
Exportations and Importation Act 1772 (repealed)	12 Geo. 3. c. 1	11 February 1772
An Act to continue and amend an Act, made in the last Session of Parliament, intituled, "An Act to continue the Prohibition of the Exportation of Corn, Grain, Meal, Flour, Bread, Biscuit, and Starch; and also of the Extraction of Low Wines and Spirits from, Wheat and Wheat Flour, for a further Time; and also, to prohibit the Exportation of Malt for a limited Time." (Note: Exportation etc. Act 1771 (11 Geo. 3. c. 1)) (Repealed by Statute Law Revision Act 1871 (34 & 35 Vict. c. 116))
Exportations and Importation (No. 2) Act 1772 (repealed)	12 Geo. 3. c. 2	11 February 1772
An Act to continue for a further Time, an Act, made in the Eighth Year of His present Majesty's Reign, (Note: Importation Act 1768 (8 Geo. 3. c. 9)) intituled, "An Act to continue and amend an Act, made in the Fifth Year of His present Majesty, (Note: Importation Act 1765 (5 Geo. 3. c. 1)) intituled, 'An Act for Importation of Salted Beef, Pork, Bacon, and Butter, from Ireland, for a limited Time;' and for allowing the Importation of Salted Beef, Pork, Bacon, and Butter, from the British Dominions in America, for a limited Time." (Repealed by Statute Law Revision Act 1871 (34 & 35 Vict. c. 116))
Land Tax Act 1772 (repealed)	12 Geo. 3. c. 3	26 February 1772
An Act for granting an Aid to His Majesty by a Land Tax, to be raised in Great Britain, for the Service of the Year One thousand seven hundred and seventy-two. (Repealed by Statute Law Revision Act 1871 (34 & 35 Vict. c. 116))
Mutiny Act 1772 (repealed)	12 Geo. 3. c. 4	26 February 1772
An Act for punishing Mutiny and Desertion, and for the better Payment of the Army and their Quarters. (Repealed by Statute Law Revision Act 1871 (34 & 35 Vict. c. 116))
Marine Mutiny Act 1772 (repealed)	12 Geo. 3. c. 5	26 February 1772
An Act for the Regulation of His Majesty’s Marine Forces while on Shore. (Repealed by Statute Law Revision Act 1871 (34 & 35 Vict. c. 116))
Malt Duties Act 1772 (repealed)	12 Geo. 3. c. 6	26 February 1772
An Act for continuing and granting to His Majesty certain Duties upon Malt, Mum, Cyder, and Perry, for the Service of the Year One thousand seven hundred and seventy-two. (Repealed by Statute Law Revision Act 1871 (34 & 35 Vict. c. 116))
East India Company (No. 1) Act 1772 (repealed)	12 Geo. 3. c. 7	1 April 1772
An Act for explaining and amending an Act, made in the Seventh Year of His present Majesty, intituled, "An Act for taking off the Inland Duty of One Shilling per Pound Weight upon all Black and Singlo Teas consumed in Great Britain; and for granting a Drawback upon the Exportation of Teas to Ireland and the British Dominions in America for a limited Time, upon such Indemnification to be made in respect thereof, by the East India Company, as is therein mentioned; for permitting the Exportation of Teas, In smaller Quantities than One Lot, to Ireland or the said Dominions in America; and for preventing Teas seized and condemned from being consumed in Great Britain;" (Note: Tea Act 1767 (7 Geo. 3. c. 56)) and for settling certain Doubts and Disputes which have arisen upon the said Act of Parliament. (Repealed by Statute Law Revision Act 1871 (34 & 35 Vict. c. 116))
Plymouth (Improvement) Act 1772 (repealed)	12 Geo. 3. c. 8	1 April 1772
An Act to explain and amend an Act, passed in the Tenth Year of His present Majesty’s Reign, (Note: Plymouth Improvement Act 1770 (10 Geo. 3. c. 14)) for paving, lighting, and watching, the Town of Plymouth, in the County of Devon; and for regulating the Carmen and Porters within the said Town. (Repealed by Plymouth Improvement Act 1824 (5 Geo. 4. c. xxii))
Bedford Level Act 1772	12 Geo. 3. c. 9	1 April 1772
An Act to enable the Governor, Bailiffs, and Commonalty of the Company of Conservators of the Great Level of the Fens, commonly called Bedford Level, to borrow upon Bonds further Money, upon Account of the Middle and South Levels, Part of the said Great Level; and for establishing a further certain Fund for Payment of the Bonds the said Corporation, out of the said Middle and South Levels.
Papists Act 1772 (repealed)	12 Geo. 3. c. 10	1 April 1772
An Act for allowing further Time for Enrollment of Deeds and Wills made by Papists, and for Relief of Protestant Purchasers. (Repealed by Statute Law Revision Act 1871 (34 & 35 Vict. c. 116))
Royal Marriages Act 1772 (repealed)	12 Geo. 3. c. 11	1 April 1772
An Act for the better regulating the future Marriages of the Royal Family. (Repealed by Succession to the Crown Act 2013 (c. 20))
Mutiny in America Act 1772 (repealed)	12 Geo. 3. c. 12	1 April 1772
An Act for further continuing Two Acts, made in the Sixth (Note: Mutiny in America Act 1766 (6 Geo. 3. c. 18)) and Ninth (Note: Mutiny in America Act 1769 (9 Geo. 3. c. 18)) Years of His Majesty's Reign, for punishing Mutiny and Desertion, and for the better Payment of the Army and their Quarters, in His Majesty's Dominions in America. (Repealed by Statute Law Revision Act 1871 (34 & 35 Vict. c. 116))
Militia Pay Act 1772 (repealed)	12 Geo. 3. c. 13	1 April 1772
An Act for desfraying the Charge of the Pay and Cloathing of the Militia in that Part of Great Britain called England, for One Year, beginning the Twenty-fifth Day of March One thousand seven hundred and seventy-two. (Repealed by Statute Law Revision Act 1871 (34 & 35 Vict. c. 116))
Great Yarmouth (Improvement) Act 1772 (repealed)	12 Geo. 3. c. 14	1 April 1772
An Act for clearing, depthening, repairing, maintaining, and improving, the Haven and Piers of Great Yarmouth; and for depthening and making more navigable the several Rivers emptying themselves into the said Haven; and for preserving Ships wintering therein from Accidents by Fire. (Repealed by Great Yarmouth Haven, Bridge and Navigation Act 1835 (5 & 6 Will. 4. c. xlix))
Edinburgh (Improvement) Act 1772 (repealed)	12 Geo. 3. c. 15	1 April 1772
An Act for lighting, cleansing, and watching, the Streets, Lanes, and other Passages, of the Burgh of Canongate, and the Liberties of Pleasance and Leith-wynd, adjoining to the Royalty of the City of Edinburgh. (Repealed by Edinburgh Police Act 1848 (11 & 12 Vict. c. cxiii))
Port Glasgow Harbour Act 1772 (repealed)	12 Geo. 3. c. 16	1 April 1772
An Act for deepening, cleansing, scouring, preserving, and maintaining, the Harbour of Port Glasgow, for enlarging and improving the Quays and Piers, for erecting New Breasts, Jetties, and Piers; and for regulating Ships, Lighters, and other Vessels, trading into and going out of the said Harbour; and for other Purposes therein mentioned. (Repealed by Port Glasgow Harbour Consolidation Act 1864 (27 & 28 Vict. c. cxl))
London (Streets) Act 1772 (repealed)	12 Geo. 3. c. 17	1 April 1772
An Act for lighting such Part of the Town of Islington, as lies in the Parish of Saint Mary Islington, in the County of Middlesex; and for establishing a regular Nightly Watch therein. (Repealed by St. Pancras Improvement Act 1812 (52 Geo. 3. c. lxxiv) and St. Mary Islington Improvement Act 1824 (5 Geo. 4. c. cxxv))
Chatham (Streets) Act 1772 (repealed)	12 Geo. 3. c. 18	16 April 1772
An Act for the better paving, cleansing, lighting, and watching, the Streets and Lanes in the Town and Parish of Chatham, in the County of Kent; and for removing and preventing Nuisances and Annoyances therein. (Repealed by Local Government Supplemental Act 1860 (No. 2) (23 & 24 Vict. c. 118))
Crown Lands in Fenchurch Street, London Act 1772 (repealed)	12 Geo. 3. c. 19 (Note: Given royal assent using the form of wording for a private act.)	16 April 1772
An Act to enable His Majesty to grant certain Houses in Fenchurch Street and Addle Street, in the City of London, escheated to the Crown by the Death of Lieutenant General John Brown without Heir, unto Frederick Montagu Esquire and his Heirs, upon the Trusts therein mentioned. (Repealed by Statute Law (Repeals) Act 1978 (c. 45))
Felony and Piracy Act 1772 (repealed)	12 Geo. 3. c. 20	16 April 1772
An Act for the more effectual proceeding against persons standing mute on their Arraignment for Felony and Piracy. (Repealed by Statute Law Revision Act 1948 (11 & 12 Geo. 6. c. 62))
Municipal Corporations (Mandamus) Act 1772 (repealed)	12 Geo. 3. c. 21	16 April 1772
An Act for giving Relief in Proceedings upon Writs of Mandamus for the Admission of Freemen into Corporations; and for other purposes therein mentioned. (Repealed by Statute Law Revision Act 1887 (50 & 51 Vict. c. 59))
Ayr Harbour Act 1772	12 Geo. 3. c. 22	16 April 1772
An Act for deepening, cleaning, scouring, preserving, and maintaining, the Harbour of Ayr; for enlarging and improving the Quays and Piers; for erecting Docks, Breads, Jetties, and Piers; and for regulating Ships, Lighters, and other vessels, trading into and going out of the said Harbour; and for other purposes therein mentioned.
Relief of Insolvent Debtors, etc. Act 1772 (repealed)	12 Geo. 3. c. 23	16 April 1772
An Act for the Relief of Insolvent debtors, and for indemnifying the Marshal of The King's Bench prison from Prosecutions at Law, for certain Escapes from the said prison. (Repealed by Statute Law Revision Act 1871 (34 & 35 Vict. c. 116))
Dockyards, &c. Protection Act 1772 (repealed)	12 Geo. 3. c. 24	16 April 1772
An Act for the better securing and preserving His Majesty’s Dock Yards, Magazines, Ships, Ammunition, and Stores. (Repealed for Great Britain by Criminal Damage Act 1971 (c. 48) and for the Isle of Man by Statute Law (Repeals) Act 1993 (c. 50))
Naval Prize Act 1772 (repealed)	12 Geo. 3. c. 25	16 April 1772
An Act for the more effectual vesting in the Royal Hospital at Greenwich, the forfeited and unclaimed Shares of Naval Officers, Seamen, and Marines, in Prizes taken from the Enemy; and for other purposes therein mentioned. (Repealed by Naval Prize Acts Repeal Act 1864 (27 & 28 Vict. c. 23))
Drainage (Cambridge, Isle of Ely) Act 1772	12 Geo. 3. c. 26	16 April 1772
An Act for embanking, draining, and preserving, certain Fen Lands and Low Grounds, in the Parish of Ramsey, in the County of Huntingdon, and in the Parishes of Doddington, March, Benwick, Wimblington, and Chatteris, within the Isle of Ely, in the County of Cambridge; and for amending the Road from a certain Bridge, in the Parish of Chateris aforesaid, called Carter's Bridge, by a Drain called Vermuyden's, or The Forty Feet Brain, to a Bridge called The Forty Feet Bridge, in the said Parish of Ramsey.
Drainage (Isle of Ely) Act 1772	12 Geo. 3. c. 27	16 April 1772
An Act to amend and render more effectual an Act, made in the Twenty-second Year of the Reign of His late Majesty King George the Second, intituled, "An Act for the more effectual draining and preserving of several Fen Lands and field Lands, in the Bounds and Precincts of Whittlesey, in the Isle of Ely, in the County of Cambridge," (Note: Isle of Ely Drainage (No. 2) Act 1748 (22 Geo. 2. c. 19)) so far as the same relates to the several Fen and field Lands lying in the Third, Fourth, and Fifth Districts described in the said Act.
Watford Churchyard and Workhouse Act 1772	12 Geo. 3. c. 28	16 April 1772
An Act to enlarge the Cœmetery or Church Yard of the Parish of Watford, in the County of Hertford; and to make an additional Building to the present workhouse, for the Reception of the Poor of the said Parish; and for other Purposes therein mentioned.
Spurn Point Lighthouse Act 1772 (repealed)	12 Geo. 3. c. 29	21 May 1772
An Act to explain and amend an Act, passed in the Sixth Year of the Reign of His present Majesty, intituled, "An Act for taking down and removing certain Lighthouses now standing near the Spurn Point, at the Mouth of the Humber; and for erecting other fit and convenient Lighthouses instead thereof." (Note: Spurn Point Lighthouse Act 1766 (6 Geo. 3. c. 31)) (Repealed by Statute Law Revision Act 1861 (24 & 25 Vict. c. 101))
Salaries of Justices of Chester, etc. Act 1772 (repealed)	12 Geo. 3. c. 30	21 May 1772
An Act for the further Augmentation of the Salaries of the Justices of Chester and the Great Sessions for the Counties in Wales. (Repealed by Statute Law Revision Act 1861 (24 & 25 Vict. c. 101))
Indemnity Act 1772 (repealed)	12 Geo. 3. c. 31	21 May 1772
An Act to indemnify such Persons as have omitted to qualify themselves for Offices and Employments; and to indemnify Justices of the Peace, or others, who have omitted to register or deliver in their Qualifications within the Time limited by Law, and for giving further Time for those Purposes; and to indemnify Members and Officers, in Cities, Corporations, and Borough Towns, whose Admissions have been omitted to be stamped according to Law, or, having been stamped, have been lost or mislaid, and for allowing them Time to provide Admissions duly stamped; and to give further Time to such Persons as have omitted to make and file Affidavits of the Execution of Indentures of Clerks to Attornies and Solicitors. (Repealed by Statute Law Revision Act 1871 (34 & 35 Vict. c. 116))
Importation Act 1772 (repealed)	12 Geo. 3. c. 32	21 May 1772
An Act for allowing the free Importation of Rice into this Kingdom, from any of His Majesty's Colonies in America, for a limited Time. (Repealed by Statute Law Revision Act 1871 (34 & 35 Vict. c. 116))
Importation (No. 2) Act 1772 (repealed)	12 Geo. 3. c. 33	21 May 1772
An Act for allowing the Importation of Wheat, Wheat Flour, Rye, Rye Meal, and Indian Corn, into this Kingdom, for a limited Time, free of Duty. (Repealed by Statute Law Revision Act 1871 (34 & 35 Vict. c. 116))
Workhouse (Westminster) Act 1772 (repealed)	12 Geo. 3. c. 34	21 May 1772
An Act to amend an Act of the Tenth Year of the Reign of His present Majesty, (Note: St. Martin in the Fields (Poor Relief) Act 1770 (10 Geo. 3. c. 75)) for building a Workhouse in the Parish of Saint Martin in the Fields, within the City of Westminster, in the County of Middlesex. (Repealed by London Government (City of Westminster) Order in Council 1901 (SR&O 1901/278))
Crown Lands at Richmond, Surrey Act 1772 (repealed)	12 Geo. 3. c. 35	21 May 1772
An Act for enabling Their Majesties to enfranchise Copyhold Lands holden of the Manor of Richmond, in the County of Surrey, and for enabling His Majesty to shut up a Lane leading from Richmond Green to the River Thames, and to sell and exchange certain Lands within the Manors of Richmond and Wimbleton. (Repealed by Statute Law (Repeals) Act 1978 (c. 45))
Richmond Chapel, Lancashire Act 1772 (repealed)	12 Geo. 3. c. 36	21 May 1772
An Act for completing a Building intended for a new Church or Chapel at Richmond, near Everton, in the County Palatine of Lancaster; and for other Purposes. (Repealed by Liverpool and Wigan Churches Act 1904 (4 Edw. 7. c. c))
Market Weighton Act 1772	12 Geo. 3. c. 37	21 May 1772
An Act for draining and preserving certain Commons, Low Grounds, and Carrs, in the Parish of Market Weighton, and other adjacent Parishes in the Fast Riding of the County of York; and for making a Navigable Cut or Canal from Market Weighton to the River Humber.
Christchurch, Middlesex Act 1772 (repealed)	12 Geo. 3. c. 38	21 May 1772
An Act for paving, cleansing, lighting, watching, and regulating the Squares, Streets, Rows, Lanes, Alleys, and other publick Passages and Places, within the Parish of Christ Church, in Middlesex; and for removing Nuisances and Obstructions therefrom, and preventing the like for the future; and for paving and regulating such Parts of Brick Lane as are not within the said Parish. (Repealed by Statute Law (Repeals) Act 2013 (c. 2))
Unfunded Debt Act 1772 (repealed)	12 Geo. 3. c. 39	21 May 1772
An Act for raising a certain Sum of Money, by Loans or Exchequer Bills, for the Service of the Year One thousand seven hundred and seventy-two. (Repealed by Statute Law Revision Act 1871 (34 & 35 Vict. c. 116))
Saint Marylebone Church Act 1772 (repealed)	12 Geo. 3. c. 40	21 May 1772
An Act for amending and rendering more effectual an Act, made in the Tenth Year of His Majesty's Reign, intituled, "An Act for building a new Parish Church, and declaring the present Parish Church a Chapel; for making a Cemetery or Church-yard; and for building an House for the Use of the Minister of the Parish of Saint Mary le Bone, in the County of Middlesex." (Note: Parish Church of St. Marylebone Act 1770 (10 Geo. 3. c. 112)) (Repealed by St. Marylebone Parish Church and Chapels Act 1811 (51 Geo. 3. c. cli))
Maidenhead Bridge Act 1772 (repealed)	12 Geo. 3. c. 41	21 May 1772
An Act for building a Bridge over the River Thames, near the Town of Maidenhead, in the County of Berks. (Repealed by Maidenhead Bridge Act 1904 (4 Edw. 7. c. xcv))
Duchy of Lancaster (Precinct of Savoy) Act 1772	12 Geo. 3. c. 42	21 May 1772
An Act for settling and determining what Parts of the Precinct of the Savoy, in the County of Middlesex, shall be under the Survey of the Court of Exchequer, and what Parts thereof under the Survey of the Duchy of Lancaster.
Crown Lands in Holborn, London Act 1772 (repealed)	12 Geo. 3. c. 43	21 May 1772
An Act for vesting Ely House, in Holborn, in His Majesty, His Heirs and Successors, and for applying the Purchase Money, with another Sum therein mentioned, in the purchasing of a Freehold Piece of Ground in Hover Street, and in the building and fitting up another House thereon, for the future Residence of the Bishops of Ely, and the Surplus to the Benefit of the See; and for other Purposes therein mentioned. (Repealed by Statute Law (Repeals) Act 1978 (c. 45))
Crown Lands (Grant to James Archibald Stuart) Act 1772 (repealed)	12 Geo. 3. c. 44	21 May 1772
An Act to enable His Majesty to grant the Reversion or Remainder in Fee-Simple, now vested in His Majesty, of and in an Annual or Fee-Farm Rent of One hundred and thirteen Pounds, One of the several Fee-Farm Rents granted to the Right Honourable Edward, heretofore Earl of Sandwich, by His late Majesty King Charles the Second, unto the Honourable James Archibald Stuart, and His Heirs, upon a full and adequate Consideration to be given by him, or his Heirs, for the same. (Repealed by Statute Law (Repeals) Act 1978 (c. 45))
Traffic Regulation (Scotland) Act 1772 (repealed)	12 Geo. 3. c. 45	3 June 1772
An Act for the better Regulation of Carters, Carriages, and loaded Horses, and for removing Obstructions and Nuisances upon the Streets and Highways within that Part of Great Britain called Scotland. (Repealed by Statute Law Revision Act 1958 (6 & 7 Eliz. 2. c. 46))
Excise Act 1772 (repealed)	12 Geo. 3. c. 46	3 June 1772
An Act for the more effectual preventing of Frauds in the Revenues of Excise, with respect to Tea, Soap, Low Wines, and Spirits. (Repealed by Statute Law Revision Act 1871 (34 & 35 Vict. c. 116))
Bankrupts Act 1772 (repealed)	12 Geo. 3. c. 47	3 June 1772
An Act to continue an Act, made in the Fifth Year of the Reign of His late Majesty King George the Second, intituled, "An Act to prevent the committing of Frauds by Bankrupts," (Note: Bankrupts Act 1731 (5 Geo. 2. c. 30)) and for making Provision for discharging Bankrupts, in certain Cases, from their Imprisonment. (Repealed by Statute Law Revision Act 1871 (34 & 35 Vict. c. 116))
Stamps Act 1772 (repealed)	12 Geo. 3. c. 48	3 June 1772
An Act for the more effectual preventing of Frauds in the Stamp Duties upon Vellum, Parchment, Paper, and Cards. (Repealed by Inland Revenue Repeal Act 1870 (33 & 34 Vict. c. 99) (Note: Incorrectly cited as "1870 c 90" in the Chronological Table of the Statutes.))
Hackney Coaches Act 1772 (repealed)	12 Geo. 3. c. 49	3 June 1772
An Act to explain and amend an Act, made in the Seventh Year of the Reign of His present Majesty, intituled, "An Act for altering the Stamp Duties upon Policies of Assurances; and for reducing the Allowance to be made in respect of the Prompt Payment of the Stamp Duties on Licences for retailing Beer, Ale, and other exciseable Liquors; and for explaining and amending several Acts of Parliament relating to Hackney Coaches and Chairs;" (Note: Stamps (No. 2) Act 1766 (7 Geo. 3. c. 44)) so far as the same relates to Hackney Coaches. (Repealed by London Hackney Carriage Act 1831 (1 & 2 Will. 4. c. 22))
Customs (No. 1) Act 1772 (repealed)	12 Geo. 3. c. 50	3 June 1772
An Act for encouraging the Manufacture of Leather, by lowering the Duty payable upon the Importation of Oak Bark, when the Price of such Bark shall exceed a certain Rate, for a limited Time. (Repealed by Customs (No. 2) Act 1823 (4 Geo. 4. c. 69))
Diseases Among Cattle Act 1772 (repealed)	12 Geo. 3. c. 51	3 June 1772
An Act for continuing an Act, made in the Tenth Year of the Reign of His present Majesty, (Note: Distemper Among Cattle Act 1770 (10 Geo. 3. c. 45)) to prevent the further spreading of the contagious Disorder among the Horned Cattle in Great Britain. (Repealed by Statute Law Revision Act 1871 (34 & 35 Vict. c. 116))
Allowance for Mint Prosecutions Act 1772 (repealed)	12 Geo. 3. c. 52	3 June 1772
An Act to enable the Lords Commissioners of His Majesty's Treasury, to order and allow, out of the Money arising by the Coinage Duty, a certain Sum therein mentioned, for the Expences of prosecuting Offenders against the Laws relating to the Coin, in the Year One thousand seven hundred and seventy, over and above the Sum yearly allowed for that Service. (Repealed by Statute Law Revision Act 1871 (34 & 35 Vict. c. 116))
Discharge to Lady Anne Jekyll's Executors Act 1772 (repealed)	12 Geo. 3. c. 53	3 June 1772
An Act to enable the Lords of the Treasury to discharge the Executors of Lady Anne Jekyll from a Debt due to His Majesty for the Use of the Sinking Fund, upon Payment of the same into the Exchequer. (Repealed by Statute Law Revision Act 1871 (34 & 35 Vict. c. 116))
Timber for the Navy Act 1772 (repealed)	12 Geo. 3. c. 54	3 June 1772
An Act for the more effectually securing a Quantity of Oak Timber for the Use of the Royal Navy. (Repealed by Statute Law Revision Act 1861 (24 & 25 Vict. c. 101))
Trade Act 1772 (repealed)	12 Geo. 3. c. 55	3 June 1772
An Act for preventing Frauds and Abuses in relation to the Trade carried on between Great Britain and Ireland. (Repealed by Statute Law Revision Act 1861 (24 & 25 Vict. c. 101))
Continuance of Certain Laws Act 1772 (repealed)	12 Geo. 3. c. 56	3 June 1772
An Act to continue several Laws relating to the Allowance upon the Exportation of British-made Gunpowder; to the giving further Encouragement for the Importation of Naval Stores from the British Colonies in America; to the further encouraging the Manufacture of British Sail Cloth, and to the Duties payable on Foreign Sail Cloth; to the granting a Liberty to carry Sugars of the Growth, Produce, or Manufacture of any of His Majesty’s Sugar Colonies directly into Foreign Parts in Ships built in Great Britain, and navigated according to Law; to the free Importation of Cattle from Ireland; and to the regulating the Fees of Officers of the Customs and Naval Officers in America. (Repealed by Statute Law Revision Act 1871 (34 & 35 Vict. c. 116))
Lazarets Act 1772 (repealed)	12 Geo. 3. c. 57	3 June 1772
An Act to explain and amend so much of an Act, made in the Sixth Year of the Reign of His late Majesty King George the Second, (Note: Quarantine Act 1732 (6 Geo. 2. c. 34)) as relates to the Establishment of Lazarets. (Note: A lazaret or lazaretto is a quarantine station for sailors.) (Repealed by Quarantine Act 1800 (39 & 40 Geo. 3. c. 80))
Herring Fisher Act 1772 (repealed)	12 Geo. 3. c. 58	3 June 1772
An Act for the further Encouragement of the Herring Fishery on the Coasts of the Isle of Man, and for obviating a Doubt which has arisen with respect to the allowing the Bounties upon the British White Herring Fishery in the Year One thousand seven hundred and seventy-one. (Repealed by Statute Law Revision Act 1861 (24 & 25 Vict. c. 101))
Crown Lands at Richmond, Surrey (No. 2) Act 1772 (repealed)	12 Geo. 3. c. 59	3 June 1772
An Act for vesting in His Majesty certain Hereditaments at Richmond, in the County of Surrey, belonging to Catharine Viscountess Fitzwilliam, and held by Lease from the Crown, and for vesting the Freehold and Inheritance of certain Leasehold and Copyhold Hereditaments at Richmond aforesaid, in Trustees and their Heirs, in Trust for the said Catharine Viscountess Fitzwilliam as a Part of the Compensation for the same; and for other Purposes therein mentioned. (Repealed by Statute Law (Repeals) Act 1978 (c. 45))
Customs (No. 2) Act 1772 (repealed)	12 Geo. 3. c. 60	3 June 1772
An Act for granting a Drawback of Part of the Customs upon the Exportation of Tea to Ireland, and the British Dominions in America; for altering the Drawback upon Foreign Sugars exported from Great Britain to Ireland; for continuing the Bounty on the Exportation of British-made Cordage; for allowing the Importation of Rice from the British Plantations into the Ports of British, Liverpoole, Lancaster, and Whitehaven, for immediate Exportation to Foreign Parts; and to empower the Chief Magistrate of any Corporation to administer the Oath, and grant the Certificate required by Law, upon the Removal of certain Goods to London, which have been sent into the Country for Sale. (Note: This act replaced the Indemnity Act 1767 (7 Geo. 3. c. 56), and was itself replaced by the Tea Act 1773 (13 Geo. 3. c. 44).) (Repealed by Statute Law Revision Act 1861 (24 & 25 Vict. c. 101))
Gunpowder Act 1772 (repealed)	12 Geo. 3. c. 61	3 June 1772
An Act to regulate the Making, Keeping, and Carriage of Gunpowder within Great Britain, and to repeal the Laws heretofore made for any of those Purposes. (Repealed by the Gunpowder Act 1860 (23 & 24 Vict. c. 139))
Tyne Bridge Act 1772	12 Geo. 3. c. 62	3 June 1772
An Act to enable the Lord Bishop of Durham, and his Successors, to raise a competent Sum of Money to be applied for the repairing, improving, or rebuilding such Part of Tyne Bridge as belongs to the See of Durham.
National Debt Act 1772 (repealed)	12 Geo. 3. c. 63	3 June 1772
An Act for redeeming One million five hundred thousand Pounds of the Capital Stocks of Three Pounds per Centum Annuities, in the Manner and on the Terms therein mentioned; and for establishing a Lottery. (Repealed by Statute Law Revision Act 1870 (33 & 34 Vict. c. 69))
Birmingham Chapels Act 1772	12 Geo. 3. c. 64	3 June 1772
An Act for building Two new Chapels, and providing Burial Places thereto, within the Town of Birmingham, in the County of Warwick.
Saint George's Fields, Surrey (Right of Common Extinguished) Act 1772 (repealed)	12 Geo. 3. c. 65	3 June 1772
An Act to extinguish the Right of Common upon an Acre of Ground called White Lyon or Hangman's Acre in Saint George's Fields, in the County of Surrey. (Repealed by Statute Law (Repeals) Act 2013 (c. 2))
Kidderminster (Small Debts) Act 1772 (repealed)	12 Geo. 3. c. 66	3 June 1772
An Act for the more easy and speedy Recovery of Small Debts within the Borough and, Foreign of Kidderminster, in the Parish of Kidderminster, in the County of Worcester. (Repealed by County Courts Act 1846 (9 & 10 Vict. c. 95))
Marine Society Act 1772	12 Geo. 3. c. 67	3 June 1772
An Act for incorporating the Members of a Society, commonly called The Marine Society, and their Successors, to be elected as therein is mentioned; and for the better empowering and enabling them to carry on their charitable and useful Designs.
Saint Sepulchre Poor (London Streets) Act 1772 (repealed)	12 Geo. 3. c. 68	3 June 1772
An Act for the better Relief and Employment of the Poor within that Part of the Parish of Saint Sepulchre which is in the County of Middlesex, and for paving, cleansing, lighting, watching, and regulating the Squares, Streets, Lanes, Alleys, Courts, Yards, and Open Passages and Places within the same, and for removing Annoyances therefrom; and for making the Communication between Charter-house Square and Saint John Street, through Charter-house Lane, more convenient. (Repealed by London Government (Borough of Finsbury) Order in Council 1901 (SR&O 1901/266))
Saint Pancras Improvement Act 1772 (repealed)	12 Geo. 3. c. 69	3 June 1772
An Act for paving, lighting, cleansing, watering, and watching the Streets and other publick Places, within such Part of the Parish of Saint Pancras, in the County of Middlesex, as lies on the West Side of Tottenham Court Road, and for preventing Nuisances and Obstructions therein, and for obliging the Trustees for the Care of the said Road to pave, repair, and cleanse such Part of the said Road as is therein described. (Repealed by London Government (Borough of St. Pancras) Order in Council 1901 (SR&O 1901/274))
Supply, etc. Act 1772 (repealed)	12 Geo. 3. c. 70	9 June 1772
An Act for granting to His Majesty a certain Sum of Money out of the Sinking Fund; and for applying certain Monies therein mentioned, for the Service of the Year One thousand seven hundred and seventy-two; and for further appropriating the Supplies granted in this Session of Parliament; and for making forth Duplicates of Exchequer Bills, Lottery Tickets, Certificates, Receipts, Annuity Orders, and other Orders, lost, burnt, or destroyed. (Repealed by Statute Law Revision Act 1871 (34 & 35 Vict. c. 116))
Repeal of Certain Laws Act 1772 (repealed)	12 Geo. 3. c. 71	9 June 1772
An Act for repealing several Laws therein mentioned against Badgers, Engrossers, Forestallers, and Regrators, and for indemnifying Persons against Prosecutions for Offences committed against the said Acts. (Repealed by Statute Law Revision Act 1871 (34 & 35 Vict. c. 116))
Bills of Exchange (Scotland) Act 1772	12 Geo. 3. c. 72	9 June 1772
An Act for rendering the Payment of the Creditors of Insolvent Debtors more equal and expeditious; and for regulating the Diligence of the Law by Arrestment and Poinding; and for extending the Privilege of Bills to Promissory Notes; and for limiting Actions upon Bills and Promissory Notes in that Part of Great Britain called Scotland.
Metropolitan Buildings Act 1772 (repealed)	12 Geo. 3. c. 73	9 June 1772
An Act for the better Regulation of Buildings and Party Walls within the Cities of London and Westminster, and the Liberties thereof, and other the Parishes, Precincts, and Places, in the Weekly Bills of Mortality, the Parishes of Saint Mary le Bone and Paddington, Saint Pancras, and Saint Luke, at Chelsea, in the County of Middlesex, and for the better preventing of Mischiefs by Fire within the said Cities, Liberties, Parishes, Precincts, and Places, and for amending and reducing the Laws relating thereto into One Act; and for other Purposes. (Repealed by Fires Prevention (Metropolis) Act 1774 (14 Geo. 3. c. 78))
Wiltshire Roads Act 1772 (repealed)	12 Geo. 3. c. 74	1 April 1772
An Act to continue and enlarge the Term and Powers of an Act, made in the Twenty-sixth Year of the Reign of King George the Second, (Note: Wiltshire and Southampton Roads Act 1753 (26 Geo. 2. c. 66)) for repairing and widening the Roads leading from Lobcombe Corner, in the Parish of Winterslow, to Harnham Bridge, in the County of Wilts; and from the West Corner of Saint Ann's Street, in the City of New Sarum, to the Parishes of Landford and Brook, and from thence to Ealing, and from Landford aforesaid, through Ower and Testwood to Ealing aforesaid, in the County of Southampton; and for repairing and widening the Road from the Rumsey and Ringwood Turnpike Road near the House of Francis Fry, to Lindhurst; and from a Place, called Hampton Ford, to Lamb's Corner, in the said County of Southampton; and for repairing the Footways within the said City. (Repealed by Roads from Winterslow and from New Sarum Act 1818 (58 Geo. 3. c. xxxi) and Winterslow and New Sarum Roads Act 1840 (3 & 4 Vict. c. xxxiv))
Chester Canal Act 1772 (repealed)	12 Geo. 3. c. 75	1 April 1772
An Act for making a navigable Cut or Canal from the River Dee, within the Liberties of the City of Chester, to or near Middlewich and Nantwich, in the County of Chester. (Repealed by Ellesmere and Chester Canals Unification Act 1813 (53 Geo. 3. c. lxxx) and Ellesmere and Chester Canal Act 1827 (7 & 8 Geo. 4. c. cii))
Norwich to Scole Bridge Road Act 1772 (repealed)	12 Geo. 3. c. 76	1 April 1772
An Act for enlarging the Term and Powers of an Act for repairing and widening the Road from the City of Norwich to Scole Bridge, in the County of Norfolk. (Repealed by Norwich and Scole Bridge Road Act 1826 (7 Geo. 4. c. xxvii))
Shrewsbury Roads Act 1772 (repealed)	12 Geo. 3. c. 77	1 April 1772
An Act to amend an Act of the Sixth Year of the Reign of His present Majesty, (Note: Shrewsbury Bridge Act 1766 (6 Geo. 3. c. 77)) for repairing and widening the Stone Bridge, in the Town of Shrewsbury; and for appropriating Part of the Tolls collected upon certain Roads leading to the said Bridge, towards finishing the same; and for granting additional Terms to the several Acts for repairing the said Roads. (Repealed by Watling Street Road Act 1808 (48 Geo. 3. c. lxv), Road from Shrewsbury to Preston Brockhurst Act 1819 (59 Geo. 3. c. lxxxvi), Roads from Shrewsbury and from Shelton Act 1822 (3 Geo. 4. c. xlii) and Shrewsbury, Wenlock and Bridgnorth Turnpike Roads Act 1851 (14 & 15 Vict. c. xxiv))
Berkshire and Southampton Roads Act 1772 (repealed)	12 Geo. 3. c. 78	1 April 1772
An Act for repairing and widening several Roads from Aldermaston, in the County of Berks, to Basingstoke, and from Aldermaston aforesaid to the Turnpike Road from Basingstoke to Andover, at or near Worting, and to the Turnpike Road leading to Winchester, at Popham Lane, in the County of Southampton. (Repealed by Aldermaston and Basingstoke Road Act 1816 (56 Geo. 3. c. xlvii) and Annual Turnpike Acts Continuance Act 1875 (38 & 39 Vict. c. cxciv))
St. Botolph, Bishopsgate (Poor Relief) Act 1772 (repealed)	12 Geo. 3. c. 79	1 April 1772
An Act for the more effectual assessing and collecting of the Rates for Relief of the Poor in the Parish of Saint Botolph Bishopgate, in the Liberties of the City of London. (Repealed by Bishopsgate Poor Relief Act 1795 (35 Geo. 3. c. 61))
Suffolk and Cambridge Roads Act 1772 (repealed)	12 Geo. 3. c. 80	1 April 1772
An Act for continuing the Term, and altering and enlarging the Powers, of an Act made in the Tenth Year of His present Majesty, (Note: Suffolk and Cambridge Roads Act 1770 (10 Geo. 3. c. 96)) for repairing and widening the Roads from the Borough of Bury Saint Edmunds to the Town of Newmarket, in the Counties of Suffolk and Cambridge; and from the South End of The Ferry Street in Brandon to Bury Saint Edmunds, in the said County of Suffolk. (Repealed by Roads from Bury St. Edmunds to Newmarket and to Brandon Act 1833 (3 & 4 Will. 4. c. xcviii))
River Lune Navigation Act 1772 (repealed)	12 Geo. 3. c. 81	1 April 1772
An Act to explain and amend an Act, made in the Twenty-third Year of the Reign of His late Majesty King George the Second, (Note: River Lune Navigation Act 1749 (23 Geo. 2. c. 12)) for improving the Navigation of the River Loyne, otherwise called Lune; and for building a Quay or Wharf near the Town of Lancaster, in the County Palatine of Lancaster. (Repealed by Lancaster Port Commission Revision Order 1967 (SI 1968/532))
Lanark Roads Act 1772 (repealed)	12 Geo. 3. c. 82	1 April 1772
An Act for repairing and widening several Roads leading through the County of Lanerk; and for building a Bridge over the River Clyde, at or near a Place, called The Howford, in the said County. (Repealed by Roads and Bridges in Lanark Act 1814 (54 Geo. 3. c. ccxv) and Glasgow City Act 1846 (9 & 10 Vict. c. cclxxxix))
Fife Roads Act 1772 (repealed)	12 Geo. 3. c. 83	1 April 1772
An Act to continue and render more effectual an Act, passed in the Twenty-sixth Year of the Reign of His late Majesty, (Note: Perth Roads Act 1753 (26 Geo. 2. c. 91)) for repairing the Road from the North Queen's Ferry, through the Towns of Inverkeithing and Kinross, to the Town of Perth; and also the Road from the said Queen’s Ferry to the Towns of Dumfermline, Torryburn, and Culross; and also the Road from the said Queen’s Ferry, through Inverkeithing, to Bruntisland and Kirkcaldie. (Repealed by Road from North Queensferry to Perth Act 1809 (49 Geo. 3. c. xxxi))
Middlesex and Hertford Roads Act 1772 (repealed)	12 Geo. 3. c. 84	1 April 1772
An Act to continue and render more effectual several Acts for repairing the Roads from the Parish of Enfield, in the County of Middlesex, to the Town of Hertford, and other Roads in the said Acts mentioned, and also for repairing the Road from the End of the Town of Hertford, to Amwell End near Ware, in the said County of Hertford. (Repealed by Hertford and Ware Roads Act 1813 (53 Geo. 3. c. xxvii) and Roads from Hertford and Ware Act 1833 (3 & 4 Will. 4. c. xlii))
Wiltshire Roads (No. 2) Act 1772 (repealed)	12 Geo. 3. c. 85	16 April 1772
An Act for repairing and widening the Road from the End of the present Turnpike Road from Besselsleigh to Hungerford, in the County of Berks, to Leckford, otherwise Sousley Water, in the County of Wilts. (Repealed by Hungerford and Leckford Road Act 1814 (54 Geo. 3. c. lxxxv) and Annual Turnpike Acts Continuance Act 1865 (28 & 29 Vict. c. 107))
Devon Roads Act 1772 (repealed)	12 Geo. 3. c. 86	16 April 1772
An Act for enlarging the Term and Powers of an Act, passed in the Second Year of His present Majesty's Reign, (Note: Devon Roads Act 1762 (2 Geo. 3. c. 50)) for repairing, widening, and altering, several Roads leading from Tavistock to Plymouth, and other Places, in the County of Devon; and for repairing and widening the Road from the Guildhall in Tavistock aforesaid, through Matthew Street and Lower Brook Street, to Cherrybrook and to Dunnabridge Pound, and from the Callington Turnpike Road to Morwellham and New Quay, in the said County. (Repealed by Roads from Tavistock to Plymouth and from Manadon Gate Act 1804 (44 Geo. 3. c. xvi) and Tavistock and New Bridge Roads Act 1804 (44 Geo. 3. c. lxxvi))
Aldwark Bridge Act 1772	12 Geo. 3. c. 87	16 April 1772
An Act for building a Bridge cross the River Ure from Great Ouseborn to Aldwork, in the County of York.
Manchester Roads Act 1772	12 Geo. 3. c. 88	16 April 1772
An Act to continue and render more effectual Two several Acts (Note: Manchester Roads Act 1731 (5 Geo. 2. c. 10)) (Note: Manchester Roads Act 1749 (23 Geo. 2. c. 5)) for repairing the Roads leading from the Town of Manchester, in the County of Lancaster, through the Town of Ashton under Line and Parish of Mottram Longdendale, and from thence to Salter's Brook, in the County Palatine of Chester.
Bedford Roads Act 1772	12 Geo. 3. c. 89	16 April 1772
An Act to continue and render more effectual several Acts for repairing the Highway between Dunstable and Hockliffe, in the County of Bedford; and from the Sign of The White Horse, to the Sign of The King's Arms in Hockliffe aforesaid; and also for making Provision for the more effectual repairing the Road leading from the Sign of The Waggon and Horses, to The Bull Inn in Dunstable aforesaid.
St. Neots to Cambridge Road Act 1772 (repealed)	12 Geo. 3. c. 90	16 April 1772
An Act for repairing and widening the Road from the West End of Saint Ive's Lane, in the Town of Saint Neot's, in the County of Huntingdon, to the Pavement at the End of Bell Lane in the Town of Cambridge. (Repealed by St. Neots and Cambridge Road Act 1813 (54 Geo. 3. c. iv) and Annual Turnpike Acts Continuance Act 1874 (37 & 38 Vict. c. 95))
Warwick Roads Act 1772 (repealed)	12 Geo. 3. c. 91	16 April 1772
An Act for repairing and widening the Road from the Warwick Road, near Solihull, to the Guide Post in Kenilworth; and from Stone Bridge to meet the aforesaid Road on Balsall Common, in the County of Warwick. (Repealed by Solihull, Kenilworth and Stonebridge Road Act 1814 (54 Geo. 3. c. xv) and Annual Turnpike Acts Continuance Act 1871 (34 & 35 Vict. c. 115))
Kent and Sussex Roads Act 1772 (repealed)	12 Geo. 3. c. 92	16 April 1772
An Act to continue, amend, and render more effectual an Act, passed in the Seventh Year of the Reign of His present Majesty, (Note: Kent and Sussex Roads Act 1766 (7 Geo. 3. c. 84)) for repairing the Roads from Tunbridge Wells, in the County of Kent to Swift's Den, in the Parish of Etchingham; and from Frant to Possingworth Great Wood, adjoining to the Turnpike Road there, leading to Blackboys, in the County of Sussex. (Repealed by Tunbridge Wells Roads Act 1808 (48 Geo. 3. c. lxviii) and Tunbridge Wells, Wadhurst and Mayfield Roads Act 1829 (10 Geo. 4. c. lvii))
Devon Roads (No. 2) Act 1772 (repealed)	12 Geo. 3. c. 93	16 April 1772
An Act for repairing and widening the Road from the Exeter Turnpike at Reedy Gate, in the Parish of Dunsford, in the County of Devon, to Cherry Brook, in the Forest of Dartmoore, in the said County. (Repealed by Dunsford and Cherrybrook Road Act 1813 (53 Geo. 3. c. iii) and Dunsford and Cherry Brook Road (Devon) Act 1833 (3 & 4 Will. 4. c. vi))
Frome Roads Act 1772 (repealed)	12 Geo. 3. c. 94	16 April 1772
An Act for enlarging the Term and Powers of an Act, made in the Thirtieth Year of the Reign of His late Majesty, (Note: Frome Roads Act 1757 (30 Geo. 2. c. 39)) for repairing and widening several Roads leading to, through, and from, the Town of Frome, in the County of Somerset, and several other Roads in the Counties of Somerset and Wilts. (Repealed by Roads to and through Frome Act 1831 (1 & 2 Will. 4. c. lxvi))
Norwich to New Buckenham Road Act 1772 (repealed)	12 Geo. 3. c. 95	16 April 1772
An Act for amending and widening the Road from Berstreet Gates, (Note: Berstrete Gate, Ber Street, Norwich, Norfolk. The gate was demolished in 1808. 52°37′16″N 1°18′04″E) in the City of Norwich, to New Buckenham, (Note: New Buckenham, Norfolk.) in the County of Norfolk. (Repealed by Norwich and New Buckenham Road Act 1833 (3 & 4 Will. 4. c. xxxix))
Salop Roads Act 1772 (repealed)	12 Geo. 3. c. 96	16 April 1772
An Act for repairing, widening, and keeping in Repair, the Road from Burlton, in the County of Salop, through Knockin, to Llanymynech, in the same County; and from Knockin to the East End of the Llanriader Road; and from Place Carrick Lane to the Turnpike Road from Llanymynech to Oswestry near Cord Issa Mountain; and from Oswestry Turnpike Road on Knockin Heath, to the East End of Knockin Lane. (Repealed by Road from Burlington to Llanymynech Act 1814 (54 Geo. 3. c. xxvi) and Annual Turnpike Acts Continuance Act 1876 (39 & 40 Vict. c. 39))
Berwick Roads Act 1772 (repealed)	12 Geo. 3. c. 97	16 April 1772
An Act for repairing and widening the Roads from the confines of the County of Berwick, at or near Banghouse Walls, to Compton's Lanes and Eymouth; and from the Town of Eccles to Eymouth; and from Whitelaw Muir to Compton's Lanes, in the County of Berwick. (Repealed by Berwick Roads Act 1792 (32 Geo. 3. c. 149))
Norfolk Roads Act 1772 (repealed)	12 Geo. 3. c. 98	21 May 1772
An Act for repairing and widening the Road leading from the East End of the Bridge (Note: Downham Bridge, carrying the A1122 road over the River Great Ouse, Downham Market, Norfolk. 52°36′01″N 0°21′26″E) across the River Ouze, in Downham Market, to the Queen's Head; and from the Chequer Inn, in Downham Market aforesaid, to the East End of the Two Mile Close, in the Parish of Barton, and towards Watton, to a Place called The Devil's Ditch, in the County of Norfolk; and for stopping up the Road leading from Stradset, through Barton Layes, towards Watton. (Repealed by Downham Market, Barton and Devil's Ditch Road Act 1832 (2 & 3 Will. 4. c. xxi))
Old Street Road Act 1772 (repealed)	12 Geo. 3. c. 99	21 May 1772
An Act for enlarging the Term and Powers of Two Acts, made in the Twenty-sixth (Note: Old Street Road Act 1753 (26 Geo. 2. c. 87)) and Twenty-ninth (Note: Old Street Road Act 1756 (29 Geo. 2. c. 44)) Years of the Reign of His late Majesty King George the Second, for repairing and widening Old Street Road, in the Parishes of Saint Luke, and Saint Leonard Shoreditch, in the County of Middlesex. (Repealed by Metropolis Roads Act 1826 (7 Geo. 4. c. cxlii))
Tyne Bridge (No. 2) Act 1772	12 Geo. 3. c. 100	21 May 1772
An Act for building a temporary Bridge over the River Tyne, between the Town of Newcastle upon Tyne and Gateshead, in the County of Durham.
Wolverhampton Roads Act 1772 (repealed)	12 Geo. 3. c. 101	21 May 1772
An Act to continue the Term, and vary the Powers, of so much of an Act, made in the Twenty-first Year of the Reign of His late Majesty, (Note: Wolverhampton Roads Act 1747 (21 Geo. 2. c. 25)) for repairing the Road from Sutton Coldfield Common, and several other Roads therein described in the County of Stafford, as relates to the Wolverhampton District of Roads. (Repealed by Wolverhampton Roads in Staffordshire and Salop Act 1831 (1 & 2 Will. 4. c. xxv))
St. Mary, Whitechapel Roads Act 1772 (repealed)	12 Geo. 3. c. 102	21 May 1772
An Act for repealing certain Provisions in Two Acts of Parliament, so far as the same relate to repairing the Highways in the Parish of Saint Mary Matfelon, otherwise Whitechapel, in the County of Middlesex; and for railing Money for repairing the said Highways. (Repealed by St. Mary's Whitechapel Improvement Act 1806 (46 Geo. 3. c. lxxxix))
River Welland Act 1772	12 Geo. 3. c. 103	21 May 1772
An Act for the better Preservation of the Great Bank of the River Welland from Spalding High Bridge, through Cowbit, Peakill, Crowland, and Peakirk, and for making and keeping in Repair, a Road thereon, and from thence to the Village of Glenton, in the Counties of Lincoln and Northampton.
Berkshire Roads Act 1772 (repealed)	12 Geo. 3. c. 104	21 May 1772
An Act to explain and amend an Act of the Eleventh Year of the Reign of His present Majesty, (Note: Berkshire and Wiltshire Roads Act 1771 (11 Geo. 3. c. 97)) for amending and widening the Road from Besselsleigh, through Wantage, to Hungerford, in the County of Berks; and from Wantage to Marlborough, in the County of Wilts; and from the Turnpike Road between Reading and Wallingford, through Halfpenny Lane, to The Old Red House upon Wantage Downs, and from thence to Lambourn, in the said County of Berks. (Repealed by Besselsleigh Road Act 1858 (21 & 22 Vict. c. xlii))
Brecon Roads Act 1772 (repealed)	12 Geo. 3. c. 105	3 June 1772
An Act for amending, widening, and altering, the Roads leading from Crickhowell, in the County of Brecon, to the Cross Hands, beyond New Inn, in the Turnpike Road between the City of Hereford and Ross; and from a Place called The Lower Cross Ways, in the Parish of Saint Maughan's to the Town of Grosmount, in the County of Monmouth; and from a Smith's Shop at Stanton, in the Parish of Llanvihangel, to Chapel a Fine, in the same County; and from the Turnpike Road, in the Parish of Welsh Newton, in the County of Hereford, to Ponttanast, in the Parish of Cluddock, in the said County. (Repealed by Ross and Abergavenny Road Act 1833 (3 & 4 Will. 4. c. lxi) (Note: Incorrectly cited as "3-4 W c lxi", omitting the sovereign's regnal number, in the Chronological Table of the Statutes.))
Glasgow and Dumbarton Roads Act 1772 (repealed)	12 Geo. 3. c. 106	21 May 1772
An Act to continue the Term, and alter and enlarge the Powers, of so much of Two Acts, made in the Twenty sixth (Note: Glasgow Roads Act 1753 (26 Geo. 2. c. 90)) and Twenty-seventh (Note: Glasgow Roads Act 1754 (27 Geo. 2. c. 27)) Years of King George the Second, for repairing several Roads leading into the City of Glasgow, as relates to that Part of the Road from the City of Glasgow, to the Town of Dumbarton, which leads through the County to the Town of Dumbarton. (Repealed by Yoker Bridge and Dumbarton Road Act 1813 (53 Geo. 3. c. lxiii))
Bedford Roads (No. 2) Act 1772 (repealed)	12 Geo. 3. c. 107	3 June 1772
An Act for repairing and widening the Road from the Forty-eighth Mile Stone, in the Parish of Cardington, in the present Turnpike Road between Hitchin and Bedford, to Great Barford Bridge; and for continuing a Road from thence to the Great Northern Road near Temsford Bridge, in the County of Bedford. (Repealed by Roads from Cardington and from Roxton Hill Act 1814 (54 Geo. 3. c. xvii) and Annual Turnpike Acts Continuance Act 1869 (32 & 33 Vict. c. 90))
Southampton Roads Act 1772 (repealed)	12 Geo. 3. c. 108	3 June 1772
An Act for repairing and widening the Roads from Sheet Bridge to Portsmouth, and from Petersfield to the Alton Turnpike Road, near Ropley, in the County of Southampton. (Repealed by Sheetbridge and Portsmouth Roads Act 1825 (6 Geo. 4. c. lxxxvii))
River Severn Act 1772	12 Geo. 3. c. 109	3 June 1772
An Act for making and keeping in Repair a Road or Passage for Horses, on the Banks of the River Severn, between Bewdley Bridge and a Place, called The Meadow Wharf at Coalbrookdale, for haling and drawing Vessels along the said River; and for other Purposes therein mentioned.
Warwick, Stafford and Worcester Roads Act 1772 (repealed)	12 Geo. 3. c. 110	16 April 1772
An Act for enlarging the Terms and Powers of Two Acts, made in the Thirteenth Year of the Reign of King George the First, (Note: Birmingham and Wednesbury Roads Act 1726 (13 Geo. 1. c. 14)) and the Twenty-first Year of the Reign of King George the Second, (Note: Warwick, Stafford and Worcester Roads Act 1747 (21 Geo. 2. c. 20)) for repairing the several Roads leading from Birmingham, through the Town of Wednesbury, to a Place called High Bullen and to Great Bridge, and from thence to the End of Gibbet Lane next adjoining to the Township of Bilson and from Great Bridge, through Dudley, to Kingswinford, and to the further End of Brittel Lane, in the Counties of Warwick, Stafford, and Worcester. (Repealed by Birmingham and Wednesbury Roads Act 1832 (2 & 3 Will. 4. c. vi) and Dudley and Brettell Lane District of Roads Act 1832 (2 & 3 Will. 4. c. lxxxiv))

=== Private acts ===
Short title	Citation	Royal assent
Long title
Meyerhoff's Naturalization Act 1772	12 Geo. 3. c. 1 Pr.	11 February 1772
An Act for naturalizing Diederich Meyerhoff.
Poel's Naturalization Act 1772	12 Geo. 3. c. 2 Pr.	11 February 1772
An Act for naturalizing John Poel.
Gentil's Naturalization Act 1772	12 Geo. 3. c. 3 Pr.	11 February 1772
An Act for naturalizing John Henry Gentil.
Laudumiey's Naturalization Act 1772	12 Geo. 3. c. 4 Pr.	11 February 1772
An Act for naturalizing Francis Darius Laudumiey.
North Crawley Inclosure Act 1772	12 Geo. 3. c. 5 Pr.	26 February 1772
An Act for dividing and enclosing the Open Common Fields, Meadows, and Waste Grounds, within the Manor and Parish of North Crawley, in the County of Bucks.
Clareton with Coneystrop and Allerton with Flaxby (Yorkshire) Inclosures Act 1772	12 Geo. 3. c. 6 Pr.	26 February 1772
An Act for dividing and enclosing several Open Fields and Waste Grounds, within the Manor of Clareton with Coneystrop, and a Piece of Waste Ground called Shortsill, in the Manor of Allerton with Flaxby, all in the County of York.
Dashwood's Name Act 1772	12 Geo. 3. c. 7 Pr.	26 February 1772
An Act to enable Henry Peyton Esquire (lately called Henry Dashwood) and his Issue, to use the Surname and Arms of Peyton, pursuant to the Will of Sir Thomas Peyton Baronet deceased.
Naturalization of Peter de la Rive and Francis Menet Act 1772	12 Geo. 3. c. 8 Pr.	26 February 1772
An Act for naturalizing Peter Lewis de la Rive and Francis Menet.
Jequier's Naturalization Act 1772	12 Geo. 3. c. 9 Pr.	26 February 1772
An Act for naturalizing James Samuel Jequier.
Lord Bathurst's Estate Act 1772	12 Geo. 3. c. 10 Pr.	1 April 1772
An Act for Sale of a Capital Freehold Messuage in Saint James’s Square, in the County of Middlesex, Part of the Entailed Estate of the Right Honourable Allen Lord Bathurst, unto Sir Watkin Williams Wynne Baronet, pursuant to an Agreement and for settling an Estate, in the County of Northampton, of greater Value, in Lieu thereof.
Wilson's Estate Act 1772	12 Geo. 3. c. 11 Pr.	1 April 1772
An Act for annulling and making void certain Articles of Agreement, made previous and in Order to the Marriage of George Wilson Esquire and Ann Sybelle his now Wife, and the Settlement made after their Marriage, in pursuance of the said Articles, in Confirmation of a Decree and Order of the High Court of Chancery.
Foxley Charity (Northamptonshire) Act 1772	12 Geo. 3. c. 12 Pr.	1 April 1772
An Act for establishing and regulating a Charity, called Foxley Charity, in the County of Northampton, founded by Lady Catharine Leveson.
Roudham Inclosure Act 1772	12 Geo. 3. c. 13 Pr.	1 April 1772
An Act for enclosing the Common Fields, Break Lands, Half-Year Lands, Lammas Meadows, Heaths, Commons, and Waste Grounds, within the Parish of Roudham, in the County of Norfolk.
Skeffington Inclosure Act 1772	12 Geo. 3. c. 14 Pr.	1 April 1772
An Act for dividing, allotting, and enclosing, the Open Fields and Commonable Places, in the Parish of Skeffington and County of Leicester.
Fincham (Norfolk) Inclosure Act 1772	12 Geo. 3. c. 15 Pr.	1 April 1772
An Act for dividing, allotting, and enclosing, the Common Fields, Half-Year Enclosures, and Commons and Waste Lands, within the Parish of Fincham, in the County of Norfolk.
Great Ormside (Westmorland) Inclosure Act 1772	12 Geo. 3. c. 16 Pr.	1 April 1772
An Act for dividing and enclosing the Common and Waste Grounds, within the Manor of Great Ormside, in the Parish of Ormside, in the County of Westmorland.
Scaftworth Inclosure Act 1772	12 Geo. 3. c. 17 Pr.	1 April 1772
An Act for dividing and enclosing the Commons and Waste Lands and Grounds, in the Township of Scaftworth, in the County of Nottingham.
Woolley Inclosure Act 1772	12 Geo. 3. c. 18 Pr.	1 April 1772
An Act for dividing and enclosing the Common and Open Fields, and other Commonable Lands and Waste Grounds, within the Manor and Parish of Woolley, in the County of Huntingdon.
Little Kington, Combrooke, and Brookehampton (Warwickshire) Inclosures Act 1772	12 Geo. 3. c. 19 Pr.	1 April 1772
An Act for allotting, dividing, and enclosing, the Open and Common Fields, and Common or Commonable Meadows, Pastures, Lands, and Grounds, and Common or Waste Land, of and within the Manor of Little Kington, Combrooke, and Brookehampton, in the County of Warwick.
Brearton Inclosure Act 1772	12 Geo. 3. c. 20 Pr.	1 April 1772
An Act for dividing and enclosing the several Moors or Commons, called Rigg Moor and Brearton Moor, within the Manor of Brearton, in the Parish of Knaresborough, in the County of York.
Denshanger Inclosure Act 1772	12 Geo. 3. c. 21 Pr.	1 April 1772
An Act for dividing and enclosing the Open and Common Fields, Common Pastures, Common Meadows, Common Grounds, and Commonable Lands, within the Hamlet of Denshanger, in the Parish of Passenham, in the County of Northampton.
Handborough Inclosure Act 1772	12 Geo. 3. c. 22 Pr.	1 April 1772
An Act for dividing and enclosing the Common Fields, Common Meadows, Common Grounds, and Commonable places, in the Parish of Handborough, in the County of Oxford.
Soulbury and Hollindon (Buckinghamshire) Inclosure Act 1772	12 Geo. 3. c. 23 Pr.	1 April 1772
An Act for dividing and enclosing the Open and Common Fields, Common Meadows, Common Pastures, and other Commonable Lands and Grounds, within the Manor and Liberties of Soulbury, with the Hamlet of Hollington, in the County of Bucks.
Rushton James Inclosure Act 1772	12 Geo. 3. c. 24 Pr.	1 April 1772
An Act for dividing and enclosing the several Commons and Waste Grounds, within the Manor of Rushton James, in the Parish of Leek, in the County of Stafford.
Moorby cum Wilksby Inclosure Act 1772	12 Geo. 3. c. 25 Pr.	1 April 1772
An Act for dividing and enclosing certain Open Common Fields, Ings, Common Pastures, and other Commonable Lands, within the Manor of Moorby cum Wilksby, in the Townships of Moorby and Wilksby, in the County of Lincoln.
Sandford Inclosure Act 1772	12 Geo. 3. c. 26 Pr.	1 April 1772
An Act for dividing and enclosing the Common and Waste Grounds, and Stinted Pasture, within the Manor of Sandford, in the Parish of Warcop, in the County of Westmorland.
Buxton Inclosure Act 1772	12 Geo. 3. c. 27 Pr.	1 April 1772
An Act for dividing and enclosing the several Commons and Waste Grounds, within the Liberty of Buxton, in the Parish of Bakewell and County of Derby.
Manton Inclosure Act 1772	12 Geo. 3. c. 28 Pr.	1 April 1772
An Act for dividing and enclosing the Common Fields, within the Parish of Manton, in the County of Rutland.
Low Toynton Inclosure Act 1772	12 Geo. 3. c. 29 Pr.	1 April 1772
An Act for dividing and enclosing the Open Fields and Commoilable Places in the Parish, Lordship, or Liberties, of Lew Toynton, in the County of Lincoln.
Epwell Inclosure Act 1772	12 Geo. 3. c. 30 Pr.	1 April 1772
An Act for dividing and enclosing a certain Open and Common Field, and Commonable Lands, in the Township, Liberties, and Precincts, of Epwell, in the County of Oxford.
Great Farringdon Inclosure Act 1772	12 Geo. 3. c. 31 Pr.	1 April 1772
An Act for dividing, enclosing, and allotting, the Open Common Fields, Commonable Lands and Meadow Ground, within the Manor and Parish of Great Farringdon, in the County of Berks.
Cavenham Inclosure Act 1772	12 Geo. 3. c. 32 Pr.	1 April 1772
An Act for dividing and enclosing the Open and Common Fields, and other Commonable Meadows, Pastures, and Grounds, within the Parish of Cavenham, in the County of Suffolk.
Middle Raisin Inclosure Act 1772	12 Geo. 3. c. 33 Pr.	1 April 1772
An Act for dividing and enclosing certain Open Fields, Moors, and Common Pastures, in the Lordship of Middle Raisin, in the County of Lincoln.
Follifoot Inclosure Act 1772	12 Geo. 3. c. 34 Pr.	1 April 1772
An Act for dividing and enclosing several Open Fields and Waste Grounds, within the Township of Follifoot, in the County of York.
Stainby Inclosure Act 1772	12 Geo. 3. c. 35 Pr.	1 April 1772
An Act for dividing and enclosing all the Open Fields, Meadows, Common Pastures, and other Commonable Lands, in the Liberties of Stainby, in the County of Lincoln.
Quinton Inclosure Act 1772	12 Geo. 3. c. 36 Pr.	1 April 1772
An Act for dividing and enclosing the Open and Common Fields, and Commonable Lands, within the Parish of Quinton, in the County of Gloucester.
Throckmorton Inclosure Act 1772	12 Geo. 3. c. 37 Pr.	1 April 1772
An Act for dividing and enclosing the Open and Common Fields, and all other Commonable Lands, within the Precincts of the Hamlet of Throckmorton, in the County of Worcester.
Snaith and Kellington (Yorkshire) Inclosures Act 1772	12 Geo. 3. c. 38 Pr.	1 April 1772
An Act for dividing and enclosing the Open, Common, Arable Fields, and the Common Meadows, Pasture Grounds, Commons and Waste Grounds, within the Townships of Follington, Bain, Whitley and Whitley Thorpe, Great Heck and Little Heck, in the Parishes of Snaith and Kellington, in the County of York.
Hammeringham Inclosure Act 1772	12 Geo. 3. c. 39 Pr.	1 April 1772
An Act for dividing and enclosing the Open Common Fields, in the Parish of Hammeringham, in the County of Lincoln.
Stapleford Inclosure Act 1772	12 Geo. 3. c. 40 Pr.	1 April 1772
An Act for dividing and enclosing all the Open Fields, Meadows, Common Pastures, and other Commonable Lands, in the Liberties of Stafford, in the County of Leicester.
Kemerton Inclosure Act 1772	12 Geo. 3. c. 41 Pr.	1 April 1772
An Act for dividing and enclosing the Open and Common Fields and Commonable Lands, within the Parish of Kemerton, in the County of Gloucester.
Carlton Inclosure Act 1772	12 Geo. 3. c. 42 Pr.	1 April 1772
An Act for dividing and enclosing a Moor, called Carlton Moor or Common, and an Open Field, called The Town Field, in the Manor and Township of Carlton, in the Parish of Gurseley, in the West Riding of the County of York.
Viscount Ligonier's Divorce Act 1772	12 Geo. 3. c. 43 Pr.	1 April 1772
An Act to dissolve the Marriage of the Right Honourable Edward Viscount Ligonier with Penelope Pitt, and to enable him to marry again; and for other Purposes therein mentioned.
Colleton's Divorce Act 1772	12 Geo. 3. c. 44 Pr.	1 April 1772
An Act to dissolve the Marriage of Sir John Colleton Baronet with Ann Fullford his now Wife, and to enable him to marry again; and for other Purposes therein mentioned.
Lewis' Divorce Act 1772	12 Geo. 3. c. 45 Pr.	1 April 1772
An Act to dissolve the Marriage of Hugh Lewis with Susannah Hale, otherwise Heale, his now Wife, and to enable him to marry again; and for other Purposes therein mentioned.
Hanckwitz's Divorce Act 1772	12 Geo. 3. c. 46 Pr.	1 April 1772
An Act to dissolve the Marriage of Ambrose Godfrey Hanckwitz with Dorothy Ashcroft his now Wife, and to enable him to marry again; and for other Purposes therein mentioned.
Making the exemplification of James Macartney's will evidence in all British and Irish courts.	12 Geo. 3. c. 47 Pr.	1 April 1772
An Act for making the Exemplification of the last Will and Testament of James Macartney Esquire deceased, Evidence in all the Courts of Law and Equity in Great Britain and Ireland.
Long's Name Act 1772	12 Geo. 3. c. 48 Pr.	1 April 1772
An Act to enable Mary and William Hutton, and the other Persons therein described, to take and use the Surname, Arms, and Crest, of Long, pursuant to the Will of James Long deceased.
Pole's Name Act 1772	12 Geo. 3. c. 49 Pr.	1 April 1772
An Act to enable Reginald Pole Esquire to take, use, and bear, the Surname and Arms of Carew, pursuant to the Will of Sir Coventry Carew Baronet deceased.
Naturalization of Arnold Meyer, Peter Boetefeur, John Rucker and John Guth Act 1772	12 Geo. 3. c. 50 Pr.	1 April 1772
An Act for naturalizing Arnold Meyer, Peter Boeteseur, John Gotthelff Rucker, and John Adam Guth.
Iselin's Naturalization Act 1772	12 Geo. 3. c. 51 Pr.	1 April 1772
An Act for naturalizing John Luke Iselin.
Rucker's Naturalization Act 1772	12 Geo. 3. c. 52 Pr.	1 April 1772
An Act for naturalizing Conrad Rucker.
Ann Nugent's and Elizabeth Eliot's Estates Act 1772	12 Geo. 3. c. 53 Pr.	16 April 1772
An Act for railing, but of the Estates late of Ann Nugent deceased, the Sum of Ten thousand Pounds, for the Benefit of the Right Honourable Robert Craggs Lord Viscount Clare, in the Kingdom of Ireland, her late Husband; and for railing out of the Estates late of Elizabeth Eliot deceased, the like Sum of Ten thousand Pounds, for the Benefit of Edward Eliot Esquire; in Recompence and Satisfaction to the said Robert Lord Viscount Clare and Edward Eliot, for their Severally consenting to give up and relinquish certain Powers of Leasing for Lives, or Years determinable on Lives, reserved to them respectively in and by the several last Wills of them the said Ann Nugent and Elizabeth Eliot, and the Settlements which have been made in pursuance thereof; and for vacating, annulling, and extinguishing, the said Powers of Leasing; and for other the purposes therein expressed.
Jones' Estate Act 1772	12 Geo. 3. c. 54 Pr.	16 April 1772
An Act for granting to William Jones Esquire, on certain Contingencies therein mentioned, a Term for Ninety-nine Years, if he shall so long live, in the Real Estates late of William Jones Esquire deceased, in the several Counties of Wilts and Berks, upon such Terms as are therein mentioned.
Mills' Estate Act 1772	12 Geo. 3. c. 55 Pr.	16 April 1772
An Act for vesting certain Lands and Tenements, in the County of Southampton, late the Estate of John Mills Esquire deceased, in Trustees to be sold; and for applying the Money arising from the Sale thereof towards discharging his Debts and Legacies.
Cruttenden's Estates Act 1772	12 Geo. 3. c. 56 Pr.	16 April 1772
An Act for vesting the Freehold and Leasehold Estates of Edward Holden Cruttenden Esquire deceased, in the Parishes of Putney and Roehampton, in the County of Surrey, in Trustees, for the purposes therein mentioned.
Benniworth Inclosure Act 1772	12 Geo. 3. c. 57 Pr.	16 April 1772
An Act to amend and enlarge the, Powers and Authorities given to George Fiescht Heneage Esquire, by an Act, made in the Tenth Year of the Reign of His present Majesty, intituled, "An Act for dividing and enclosing certain Open and Common fields and Grounds, within the Parish of Benniworth, in the County of Lincoln," (Note: Benniworth Inclosure Act 1770 (10 Geo. 3. c. 22 Pr.)) to charge certain Lands and Hereditaments, Parcel of the Manor of Benniworth, in the County of Lincoln, of which he is now strict Tenant for Life, with a certain Sum of Money for reimbursing to him the Expences which he has been at in the enclosing the same; and for other purposes therein mentioned.
Barleythorpe Inclosure Act 1772	12 Geo. 3. c. 58 Pr.	16 April 1772
An Act for dividing and enclosing the Open and Common fields, Commons, and Common Grounds, within the Hamlet of Barlythorpe, in the Parish of Oakham, in the County of Rutland.
Kingsnorton Inclosure Act 1772	12 Geo. 3. c. 59 Pr.	16 April 1772
An Act for dividing and enclosing the Common and Waste Lands within the Manor and Parish of Kingsnorton, in the County of Worcester.
Ockbrook Inclosure Act 1772	12 Geo. 3. c. 60 Pr.	16 April 1772
An Act for dividing and enclosing several Open fields, Meadow, pasture, Common, and Waste Grounds, within the Liberties of Ockbrook, in the County of Derby.
Welton (Yorkshire) Inclosure Act 1772	12 Geo. 3. c. 61 Pr.	16 April 1772
An Act for dividing and enclosing certain Open fields, Lands, and Waste Grounds, within the Township of Welton, in the East Riding of the County of York.
Bourn Inclosure Act 1772	12 Geo. 3. c. 62 Pr.	16 April 1772
An Act for dividing, enclosing, and draining, a certain Parcel of Land, called or known by the Name of The Cow pasture, lying in the South Fen in the Parish of Bourn, in the County of Lincoln; and for amending and rendering more effectual an Act, made in the Sixth Year of His present Majesty's Reign, intituled, "An Act for allotting, dividing, enclosing, and draining, several Open and Common fields, Meadows, Waste, and Fen Grounds, within the Manor and Parish of Bourn, in the County of Lincoln." (Note: Bourn Inclosure Act 1766 (6 Geo. 3. c. 52 Pr.))
Sigglesthorne Inclosure Act 1772	12 Geo. 3. c. 63 Pr.	16 April 1772
An Act for dividing and enclosing the several Open fields, Lands, and Grounds, within the Township of Sigglesthorne, in Holderness, in the East Riding of the County of York.
Holderness Drainage Act 1772	12 Geo. 3. c. 64 Pr.	16 April 1772
An Act for draining the Low Grounds and Cam, lying in the several Parishes, Townships, and Places, of Keyingham, Keyingham Marsh, Ryhill and Camerton, Burstwick and Skeckling, Burton Pidsea and Ridgmont, Ottringham, Halsham, Owstwick, Ross, Rimswell, Tunstall, Waxholme, Elsternwick, Lelley, Humbleton, Fitling, Hilston, Garston, Albrough, Flinton, and Tansterne, within the Seigniory of Holderness and East Riding of the County of York.
Tardebigg Inclosure Act 1772	12 Geo. 3. c. 65 Pr.	16 April 1772
An Act for dividing and enclosing such Part of the Common and Waste Lands in the Parish of Tardebigg, as lies in the County of Worcester.
Warwick (St. Nicholas Parish) Inclosure Act 1772	12 Geo. 3. c. 66 Pr.	16 April 1772
An Act for allotting, dividing, and enclosing, the Open and Common fields, and Common or Commonable Meadows, pastures, Lands, and Grounds, and Common or Waste Land, within the Parish of Saint Nicholas, in the Manor of Warwick, in the County of Warwick.
Brampton Inclosure Act 1772	12 Geo. 3. c. 67 Pr.	16 April 1772
An Act for dividing, allotting, and enclosing, the Open and Common fields, Meadows, Commonable Lands, and Commons, within the Manor, Parish, and Liberties, of Brampton, in the County of Huntingdon.
Great Ponton Inclosure Act 1772	12 Geo. 3. c. 68 Pr.	16 April 1772
An Act to confirm and establish an Indenture of Agreement for dividing and enclosing several fields, Lands, and Grounds, in the Manor and Parish of Great Paunton, in the County of Lincoln; and for dividing and enclosing several other Common fields, Heath, and Waste Grounds, in the same Manor and Parish.
Welton (Lincolnshire) Inclosure Act 1772	12 Geo. 3. c. 69 Pr.	16 April 1772
An Act for dividing and enclosing certain Open fields, Lands, and Grounds, in the Township and Parish of Welton, in the County of Lincoln.
Kemble and Pool Inclosure Act 1772	12 Geo. 3. c. 70 Pr.	16 April 1772
An Act for enclosing the Open Common fields, and a Common of pasture, and other Commonable Lands, and Waste Grounds, in the Manors and Parishes of Kemble and Pool, in the County of Wilts.
West Halton Inclosure Act 1772	12 Geo. 3. c. 71 Pr.	16 April 1772
An Act for dividing and enclosing certain Open fields, Lands, and Grounds, in the Lordships, of West Halton, in the County of Lincoln.
Draper's Divorce Act 1772	12 Geo. 3. c. 72 Pr.	16 April 1772
An Act to dissolve the Marriage of Richard Draper with Elizabeth Hartnell his now Wife, and to enable him to marry again; and for other purposes therein mentioned.
Skinn's Divorce Act 1772	12 Geo. 3. c. 73 Pr.	16 April 1772
An Act to dissolve the Marriage of William Skinn with Ann Skinn his how Wife, and to enable him to marry again; and for other purposes therein mentioned.
Sellon's Naturalization Act 1772	12 Geo. 3. c. 74 Pr.	16 April 1772
An Act for naturalizing Henry Francis Sellon.
Bousquet's Naturalization Act 1772	12 Geo. 3. c. 75 Pr.	16 April 1772
An Act for naturalizing John Bousquet.
Lautier's Naturalization Act 1772	12 Geo. 3. c. 76 Pr.	16 April 1772
An Act for naturalizing John Lewis Lautier.
Pourtalés' Naturalization Act 1772	12 Geo. 3. c. 77 Pr.	16 April 1772
An Act for naturalizing Jaques Louis Pourtales.
Brydges' Estate Act 1772	12 Geo. 3. c. 78 Pr.	21 May 1772
An Act for vesting in the Most Noble Augustus Henry Duke of Grafton, and his Heirs, the Manor or reputed Manor, and Rectory and Parsonage Appropriate of Potterspury, otherwise Eastpury, in the County of Northampton, (except the Presentation to the Advowson of the Church there), and certain Messuages, Lands, Tithes, and Hereditaments, situate and arising in the same County, the Estate of Robert Brydges Esquire a Lunatic, and for vesting in Thomas Hancox Esquire, and his Heirs, a certain Wood and Wood Land called Darvell, otherwise Dorvell Wood, in the County of Gloucester, also the Estate of the said Lunatic, on Payment by the said Duke and Thomas Hancox of their respective Purchase Money in such Manner and for such Purposes as in the said Act is mentioned.
Duke of Buccleugh's Estate Act 1772	12 Geo. 3. c. 79 Pr.	21 May 1772
An Act for vesting the legal Estate and Interest of and in certain Freehold Lands at Adderbury, in the County of Oxford, now vested in Charles Townshend Esquire, an Infant Trustee, in the Most Noble Henry Duke of Buccleugh and his Heirs, and in certain Copyhold Lands in Kenneth Mackenzie Esquire, and his Heirs, in Trust for the said Duke and his Heirs.
Countess of Sandwich's Estates Act 1772	12 Geo. 3. c. 80 Pr.	21 May 1772
An Act to enable the Right Honourable John Earl of Sandwich, and the Honourable John Montagu, commonly called Lord Viscount Hinchinbrook, and the Survivor of them, to grant Leases of the Countess Of Sandwich’s Moiety of Estates in the Counties of Admagh and Limerick, in the Kingdom of Ireland.
Earl of Carlisle's Estate Act 1772	12 Geo. 3. c. 81 Pr.	21 May 1772
An Act to empower certain Persons to enfranchise several Customary Lands and Hereditaments, Parcel of the several Manors of Brampton, Farlom, Upper Denton; Nether Denton, Talhn, Irthington, Laversdale, Newby, Askerton, Warton Wood, Troddermarn, Hayton cum. Whitton, Carlatton Castle, Carrock, Cumrew, Blackenthwaite, and Newbiggin, within the Barony or reputed Barony of Gilsland, in the County of Cumberland, late the Estate of Henry Earl of Carlisle deceased, and settled to certain Uses by the Will of the said Henry Earl of Carlisle; and for other Purposes therein mentioned.
Colebrooke's Estate Act 1772	12 Geo. 3. c. 82 Pr.	21 May 1772
An Act for vesting, in Sir George Colebrooke Baronet, and his Heirs, so much of the Manor or Lordship of Stebunheath, otherwise Stebunhith, otherwise Stepney, in the County of Middlesex, Part of the Estate of the said Sir George Colebrooke, as is limited and settled in and by an Act of Parliament which passed in the Second Year of the Reign of His present Majesty King George the Third, (Note: Colebrooke's Estate Act 1762 (2 Geo. 3 c. 54 Pr.)) and for settling other Lands and Hereditaments in Lieu thereof; and also for vesting other Settled Estates of the said Sir George Colebrooke, in the Counties of Middlesex and Surrey, in Trustees, for the Purposes therein mentioned.
Shelley's Estate Act 1772	12 Geo. 3. c. 83 Pr.	21 May 1772
An Act to enable Trustees, with the Consent of the Persons claiming under the Will of Edward Shelley Esquire, to cut down and sell Timber, upon the Settled Estates of the said Edward Shelley, in the County of Sussex, and to invest the Monies arising therefrom in the Purchase of Lands and Hereditaments to be settled to the Uses of the said Will, and other Purposes.
Queen Elizabeth's Grammar School Ashbourne Estate Act 1772	12 Geo. 3. c. 84 Pr.	21 May 1772
An Act to enable the Governors, and Assistants to the said Governors, in the Rule and Government of the Possessions, Revenues, and Goods, of the Free Grammar School of Elizabeth Queen of England, in the Town of Asheburne, in the County of Derby, in their Corporate Capacity; and the said Governors and Assistants, as Trustees of Six Almshouses in Asheburne aforesaid, founded and endowed by Christopher Pegg Esquire deceased, to convey certain Lands and Possessions of the said School and Almshouses respectively in the Parishes of Wingerworth and Ashover, in the said County, to Henry Gladwin of Wingerworth, in the said County Esquire, in Exchange for other Lands in the Parish of Brailsford, in the said County, of greater Value, to be conveyed to and held by them respectively, to the Uses, and upon the Trusts, therein mentioned.
Danvers' Estate Act 1772	12 Geo. 3. c. 85 Pr.	21 May 1772
An Act for empowering and enabling the Trustees named in the Settlement made on the Marriage of Daniel Danvers Esquire and Mary his Wife, or the Survivors or Survivor of them, or the Heirs of such Survivor, to make Sale of certain Leasehold Estates vested in them, upon divers Trusts mentioned in the said Settlement, and to lay out the Money arising from such Sale in the Purchase of other Estates to be settled in such Manner as the said Leasehold Estates stand settled.
Vesting a messuage in Lothbury in the city of London in trustees for sale and purchasing and settling another.	12 Geo. 3. c. 86 Pr.	21 May 1772
An Act for vesting a Messuage, with the Appurtenances, in Lothbury, within the City of London, in Trustees, to be sold, and for purchasing another Messuage or Lands to be settled to the like Uses.
Halhed's Estate Act 1772	12 Geo. 3. c. 87 Pr.	21 May 1772
An Act for vesting the Settled Estate of William Halhed Esquire, in the County of Hereford, in Trustees, in Trust to sell and convey the same to James King Esquire, and his Heirs, pursuant to an Agreement for that Purpose; and for laying out the Money arising by such Sale in the Purchase of other Lands and Hereditaments to be settled in Lieu thereof to the same Uses.
Enabling Henry Blundell, tenant for life under settlement, to carry into execution articles of agreement for an exchange of lands with the Earl of Sefton.	12 Geo. 3. c. 88 Pr.	21 May 1772
An Act for enabling Henry Blundell Esquire, Tenant for Life under Settlement, to carry into Execution Articles of Agreement between him and the Right Honourable the Earl of Sefton for the Exchange of divers Messuages, Lands, and Hereditaments, comprised in such Settlement for other Messuages, Lands, and Hereditaments of the said Earl; and for other Purposes therein mentioned.
Sandys' Estate Act 1772	12 Geo. 3. c. 89 Pr.	21 May 1772
An Act to enable the Guardians of the Infant Children of the Honourable Mary Sandys deceased, to make Leases of their Settled Estates in England and Ireland during their respective Minorities.
Smith's Estate Act 1772	12 Geo. 3. c. 90 Pr.	21 May 1772
An Act to enable the Trustees of the Estate of Henry Smith Esquire deceased, to apply certain Sums of Money to the Relief of his poor Kindred, and to enable the said Trustees to grant Building Leases of an Estate in the Parishes of Kensington, Chelsea, and Saint Martin in the Fields, in the County of Middlesex.
Hulton's Estates Act 1772	12 Geo. 3. c. 91 Pr.	21 May 1772
An Act to empower William Hulton Esquire to charge his Settled Estates in the County of Lancaster, or some Parts thereof, with One thousand two hundred Pounds, and Three thousand Pounds, for the Purposes therein mentioned; and also to grant Leases of certain Parts of his said Estates.
Baldwyn's Estate Act 1772	12 Geo. 3. c. 92 Pr.	21 May 1772
An Act for vesting the Manors, Lands, and Tenements, both Freehold and Leasehold, comprised in the Marriage Settlement of Charles Baldwyn Esquire, in Trustees, to be sold, and for laying out the Money arising by such Sale in the Purchase of other Lands and Hereditaments, to be settled to the same Uses which are now subsisting with regard to the said Freehold Settled Estate.
Kemeys' Estates Act 1772	12 Geo. 3. c. 93 Pr.	21 May 1772
An Act for vesting the Settled Estates and Unsettled Estates of John Gardner Kemeys Esquire, in Trustees, in Trust, by Sale or Mortgage, to raise Money to pay off Portions and Debts, and redeem. Annuities charged upon and affecting the same; and for resettling the Remainder thereof, and Lands to be purchased as in the said Act is directed, to the Uses to which the said Settled Estates do now Hand settled and limited.
Basset's Estate Act 1772	12 Geo. 3. c. 94 Pr.	21 May 1772
An Act to veil in the Trustees named in the Will of Francis Baffet Esquire deceased, such Powers of leasing and granting Setts of and on the Estates comprised in the Settlement made upon the Marriage of John Pendarves Basset Esquire deceased, as by the said Settlement were given to the Trustees; therein named.
Elizabeth Pearce's and William Hall's Estate Act 1772	12 Geo. 3. c. 95 Pr.	21 May 1772
An Act for vesting Part of the Estates late of Elizabeth Pearce Widow deceased, and William Hall Esquire, otherwise Pearce, her eldest Son, in Trustees, to be sold for Payment of the Positions of her younger Children, and other Incumbrances, and for settling other Part of her Estates to the same Uses, and for other Purposes.
Partition between the several persons entitled to estates devised by the wills of Thomas Walker and Stephen Skynner.	12 Geo. 3. c. 96 Pr.	21 May 1772
An Act for making a Partition of divers Manors, Messuages, Lands, and Hereditaments, in the several Counties of Norfolk, Suffolk, Essex, Surrey, and Middlesex, and in the City of London; and of Four Fifth Parts or Shares of a Plantation in the Island of Barbados, in the West Indies; and of Two Shares in the New River Water Works; and of an annual Rent of One Thousand Pounds, issuing out of the Revenues of the Post Office, devised by the Will of Thomas Walker Esquire deceased; and also of a Manor and divers Messuages, Lands, and Hereditaments, in the several Counties of Suffolk, Essex, and Gloucester, comprised in the Settlements executed upon the Marriage of Stephen Skynner Esquire deceased; and also of divers Messuages, Lands, and Hereditaments, in the several Counties of Suffolk, Essex, and Surrey, devised by the Will of the said Stephen Skynner between the several Persons entitled to the said Estates, according to their respective Interests therein.
Stoke Prior Inclosure Act 1772	12 Geo. 3. c. 97 Pr.	21 May 1772
An Act for dividing and enclosing the Commons and Waste Grounds within the Parish and Manor of Stoke Prior, in the County of Worcester.
Would Newton Inclosure Act 1772	12 Geo. 3. c. 98 Pr.	21 May 1772
An Act for dividing, enclosing, and allotting, the Open Fields, Common Pastures, and other unenclosed Grounds, within the Township of Would Newton, in the East Riding of the County of York.
Gumley Inclosure Act 1772	12 Geo. 3. c. 99 Pr.	21 May 1772
An Act for dividing, allotting, and enclosing, the Open and Common Fields, in the Parish of Gumley, in the County of Leicester.
Astrop Inclosure Act 1772	12 Geo. 3. c. 100 Pr.	21 May 1772
An Act for dividing and enclosing the Open and Common Field and Commonable Lands, in the Liberties, Territories, and Precincts, of Astrop, in the Parishes of Kings Sutton and Newbottle, in the County of Northampton.
Ackworth Inclosure Act 1772	12 Geo. 3. c. 101 Pr.	21 May 1772
An Act for dividing and enclosing the Open Common Fields, Commons, and Waste Lands, and a Stinted Pasture, called The Cow Posture, in the Parish of Ackworth, in the County of York.
Terrington Inclosure Act 1772	12 Geo. 3. c. 102 Pr.	21 May 1772
An Act for dividing, allotting, enclosing, and draining, the Open Fields, Common Pastures, and Moors or Commons in the Township and Parish of Terrington, in the North Riding of the County of York.
Heath or Hethe (Oxfordshire) inclosure and for exonerating William Fermor's lands from tithes and right of common.	12 Geo. 3. c. 103 Pr.	21 May 1772
An Act for dividing and enclosing the Open and Common Fields, Common Pastures, Common Meadows, and Common and Waste Grounds, within the Manor and Parish of Heath, otherwise Hethe, in the County of Oxford; and for exonerating certain Lands belonging to William Fermor Esquire from Tithes and Right of Common.
Shilton Inclosure Act 1772	12 Geo. 3. c. 104 Pr.	21 May 1772
An Act for dividing and enclosing the Common Fields and Commonable Lands within the Parish of Shilton, in the County of Warwick.
Thorpe Achurch Inclosure Act 1772	12 Geo. 3. c. 105 Pr.	21 May 1772
An Act for dividing and enclosing the Open Common Fields, Meadow Grounds, and other Commonable Lands, within the Parish of Thorpe Achurch, in the County of Northampton.
Aldwinckle Inclosure Act 1772	12 Geo. 3. c. 106 Pr.	21 May 1772
An Act for dividing and enclosing the Common and Open Fields, Meadows, Commonable Lands, and Waste Grounds, in Aldwincle, in the County of Northampton.
Blockley, Draycot, and Paxford (Worcestershire) Inclosure Act 1772	12 Geo. 3. c. 107 Pr.	21 May 1772
An Act for dividing and enclosing several Open and Common Fields, Common Meadows, Grounds, Common Pastures, and other Commonable Places, in the Township of Blockley and Hamlets of Braycot and Paxford, in the Parish of Blockley and County of Worcester.
Eastleach Turville Inclosure Act 1772	12 Geo. 3. c. 108 Pr.	21 May 1772
An Act for dividing and enclosing the Open and Common Field, Downs, and Commonable Lands, within the Manor and Parish of Eestleach Tourville, in the County of Gloucester.
Kings Ripton Inclosure Act 1772	12 Geo. 3. c. 109 Pr.	21 May 1772
An Act for dividing and enclosing the Open and Common Fields, Meadows, and other Commonable Lands and Waste Grounds, within the Parish and Manor of King's Ripton, in the County of Huntingdon.
Wing Inclosure Act 1772	12 Geo. 3. c. 110 Pr.	21 May 1772
An Act for dividing, allotting, and enclosing, the Open and Common Fields, Meadows, Lands, and Waste Grounds, of, within, and belonging to, the Manor, Parish, and Liberties, of Wing, in the County of Rutland.
Kirton Inclosure Act 1772	12 Geo. 3. c. 111 Pr.	21 May 1772
An Act for dividing and enclosing the Common Fen, and certain other Commonable Places and Open Fields, within the Parish of Kirton, in the Parts of Holland, in the County of Lincoln.
Wigtoft Inclosure Act 1772	12 Geo. 3. c. 112 Pr.	21 May 1772
An Act for dividing and enclosing the Common Fen, Open Fields, and certain other Commonable Places, belonging to and in the Parish of Wigtoft, in the County of Lincoln.
Sutterton Inclosure Act 1772	12 Geo. 3. c. 113 Pr.	21 May 1772
An Act for dividing and enclosing the Common Fen, Common Marsh, and other Commonable Places, within the Parish of Sutterton, in the County of Lincoln.
Hampsteels Moor in Lanchester (Durham) Inclosure Act 1772	12 Geo. 3. c. 114 Pr.	21 May 1772
An Act for dividing and enclosing a certain Moor or Common called Hamsteels Moor, within the Parish and Manor of Lanchester, in the County Palatine of Durham.
Laneham Inclosure Act 1772	12 Geo. 3. c. 115 Pr.	21 May 1772
An Act for dividing and enclosing the Open Fields, Meadows, Common Pastures, and Waste Grounds, in the Parish of Laneham, in the County of Nottingham.
George Collier's Divorce Act 1772	12 Geo. 3. c. 116 Pr.	21 May 1772
An Act to dissolve the Marriage of George Collier Esquire with Christiana Gwynn his now Wife, and to enable him to marry again; and for other Purposes therein mentioned.
Cazenove's Naturalization Act 1772	12 Geo. 3. c. 117 Pr.	21 May 1772
An Act for naturalizing Frederick Cazenove.
Naturalization of Paul Pourtalés and Francis Muller Act 1772	12 Geo. 3. c. 118 Pr.	21 May 1772
An Act for naturalizing Paul Pourtales and Francis Gabriel Charles Mutter.
Duke of Devonshire's Estate Act 1772	12 Geo. 3. c. 119 Pr.	3 June 1772
An Act to enable the Most Noble William Duke of Devonshire to grant Reversionary Leases of his Leasehold Estate, in the Parish of Saint James Westminster, in the County of Middlesex.
Earl Spencer's Estate Act 1772	12 Geo. 3. c. 120 Pr.	3 June 1772
An Act for discharging divers Manors, Rectories, Advowsons, Messuages, Lands, Tithes, Rents, and Hereditaments, Part of the Estate of the Right Honourable John Earl Spencer, comprised in and settled by the last Will and Testament, and Codicil thereto, of the Most Noble Sarah late Duchess Dowager of Marlborough deceased, and by certain Conveyances executed in pursuance thereof, from the, Uses and Trusts declared by the said Will, Codicil, and Conveyances; and for settling other Manors, Rectories, Advowsons, Messuages, Lands, Tenements, Tithes, and Hereditaments, of greater Value, in Lieu thereof, to the like Uses.
Countess Dowager of Derby's Estate Act 1772	12 Geo. 3. c. 121 Pr.	3 June 1772
An Act for vesting the Manor of East Lavant, and divers Messuages and Lands, with the Appurtenances, in the County of Sussex, entailed by the Will of the Right Honourable Mary late Countess Dowager of Derby deceased, in Trustees, to be sold; and for purchasing other Lands and Hereditaments, to be settled to the like Uses.
Fenwick's Estate Act 1772	12 Geo. 3. c. 122 Pr.	3 June 1772
An Act to vest in Trustees to be sold, certain Estates in the Counties of York, Westmorland, and Lancaster, which belonged to Ann Fenwick Widow, before her Intermarriage; and for the Relief of the said Ann Fenwick, in such Manner as in the said Act is mentioned.
Crespigny's Estate Act 1772	12 Geo. 3. c. 123 Pr.	3 June 1772
An Act for vesting certain Freehold and Copyhold Hereditaments in Weeting, in the County of Norfolk, Part of the Settled Estate of Philip Champion Crespigny Esquire, in Trustees, to be sold, and for laying out the Money to arise by Sale thereof in the Purchase of other Lands and Hereditaments, to be settled to the same Uses as the said Premises in Weeling now stand limited.
Vesting in the Bank of England, estates belonging to The Drapers Company of London, freed from certain charities to which they are subject, in exchange for other estates belonging to the said bank, subject to aforementioned charities.	12 Geo. 3. c. 124 Pr.	3 June 1772
An Act for vesting certain Estates belonging to the Drapers Company of the City of London, in the Governor and Company of the Bank of England, freed and discharged from certain Charities to which the same are Subject, and for vesting other Estates belonging to the said Governor and Company of the Bank, in the said Company of Drapers, Subject to the before mentioned Charities.
Manerdivy Rectory (Pembrokeshire) Act 1772	12 Geo. 3. c. 125 Pr.	3 June 1772
An Act to vest in Walter Lloyd Esquire, and others, a small Quantity of Ground, Parcel of the Glebe of the Rectory of Manerdivy, in the County of Pembroke, in Consideration of a certain yearly Rent thereby secured, and for other Purposes therein mentioned.
Bullock's Estate Act 1772	12 Geo. 3. c. 126 Pr.	3 June 1772
An Act for the Sale of certain Messuages, Lands, Tenements, Hereditaments, and Premises, in the Parish of Saint George the Martyr, and Borough of Southwark, in the County of Surrey, Part of the Settled Estate of John Bullock Esquire and Elizabeth his Wife, and for laying out the Money arising by Sale thereof in the Purchase of other Estates to be settled to the same Uses.
Rolle's Estate Act 1772	12 Geo. 3. c. 127 Pr.	3 June 1772
An Act to enable John Rolle Esquire, and Judith Maria Walrond Spinster, to make Settlements on the Marriage intended between them, notwithstanding their respective Minorities.
Minchin's Estate Act 1772	12 Geo. 3. c. 128 Pr.	3 June 1772
An Act for vesting the Settled Estates of Humphry Minchin Esquire, in the County of Tipperary, in the Kingdom of Ireland, in Trustees, to tell the same; and for laying out the Money arising thereby, in the Purchase of other Estates, in that Part of Great Britain called England, or in the Principality of Wales, to be settled to the same Uses.
Wall's Estates Act 1772	12 Geo. 3. c. 129 Pr.	3 June 1772
An Act for vesting in Trustees, certain Estates, situate in the Counties of Kent and Surrey, upon Trust, to sell and dispose of the same, and invest the Monies arising thereby in the Purchase of other Estates, to be settled to such of the Uses of the Will of William Wall deceased, as are now subsisting.
Colonel James Catchcart's Estate Act 1772	12 Geo. 3. c. 130 Pr.	3 June 1772
An Act for Sale of One undivided Fourth Part of the Lands of Innerleith, lying in the County of Edinburgh, and of One undivided Fourth Part of the Lands of Darnchester, in the County of Berwick, being Parts of the entailed Estate of Colonel James Cathcart deceased, and for purchasing other Lands and Estates to be settled in Lieu thereof upon the same Persons, and to the like Uses and Purposes.
Bathwick Roads and Bridge, etc. Act 1772	12 Geo. 3. c. 131 Pr.	3 June 1772
An Act for giving further Powers to the Trustees named in a certain Act of Parliament, made in the Ninth Year of the Reign of His present Majesty, intituled, "An Act to empower the Trustees of the Will of the late General Pulteney and other Trustees appointed by this Act, to purchase and exchange Lands and Grounds in the Manor of Bathwick, in the County of Somerset, for the Purpose of making certain Roads and Ways to and from a free Bridge by them intended to be built over the River Avon, in the said County; and also to empower the Persons in Possession of the said Estate for the Time being, under the said Will, to grant Leases of certain Lands and Houses in the said Manor; and likewise to enable the said Trustees to grant certain Grounds and Springs of Water within the said Manor of Bathwick, to the Mayor, Aldermen, and Citizens of Bath, and for extending the Jurisdiction of the said Mayor, Aldermen, and Citizens, over Part of the said Manor of Bathwick, and for other Purposes therein mentioned;" (Note: Bathwick Roads and Bridge, etc. Act 1769 (9 Geo. 3. c. 95)) and for enlarging the Powers of Leasing given by the said Act to the Persons therein named; and for other Purposes.
Barbor's Estate Act 1772	12 Geo. 3. c. 132 Pr.	3 June 1772
An Act for re-investing divers Manors, Messuages, Lands, Tenements, and Hereditaments, situate and being in the County of Stafford, late the Estate of Robert Barbor Esquire deceased, in the several Persons now in being, and for such Estates as they are severally entitled under the Will of the said Robert Barbor; and for enabling James Mayo and Charles Mayo to join in such Conveyances as shall be necessary for those Purposes.
Buckley's Estate Act 1772	12 Geo. 3. c. 133 Pr.	3 June 1772
An Act to empower James Batson and Edward Buckley Batson Esquires, Testamentary Guardians of the Person and Estate of Edward Pery Buckley an Infant, to grant Leases of the Estate of Pery Buckley Esquire deceased.
Parrott's Estate Act 1772	12 Geo. 3. c. 134 Pr.	3 June 1772
An Act for vesting a Messuage called Highfield House, and divers Lands, with the Appurtenances, in the County of Gloucester, the Settled Estates of Benjamin Jason Perrott Esquire, in Trustees, to be sold and conveyed as therein mentioned; and for laying out the Money arising by such Sale in the Purchase of other Lands and Hereditaments, to be settled to the like Uses.
Edward, Elizabeth and Tomlinson Bunting's Estate Act 1772	12 Geo. 3. c. 135 Pr.	3 June 1772
An Act for vesting divers Freehold, Copyhold, and Leasehold Estates, late of Edmund Bunting, Elizabeth Bunting, and Tomlinson Bunting, deceased, in Trustees, to be sold to raise Money to be applied, under the Direction of the Court of Chancery, in Payment of the Debts, Incumbrances, and Legacies, charged upon and assessing the same, and other the Purposes therein mentioned.
Appleby Inclosure Act 1772	12 Geo. 3. c. 136 Pr.	3 June 1772
An Act for dividing and enclosing certain Commons and Waste Grounds, within the Manor of Appleby, in the County of Westmorland.
Wigmore Inclosure Act 1772	12 Geo. 3. c. 137 Pr.	3 June 1772
An Act for enclosing, dividing, allotting, and improving, certain Common Woods and Moor Lands, within the Borough and Parish of Wigmore, in the County of Hereford.
Much Wenlock Inclosure Act 1772	12 Geo. 3. c. 138 Pr.	3 June 1772
An Act for dividing and enclosing certain Open Parcels of Arable and Pasture Grounds; in the Manor of Much Wenlock, otherwise Wenlock Magna, otherwise Great Wenlock, in the County of Salop.
Moulton Inclosure Act 1772 (repealed)	12 Geo. 3. c. 139 Pr.	3 June 1772
An Act for dividing and enclosing the Open and Common Fields, Common Meadows, Common Pastures, Common Grounds, Heath, and Waste Grounds, in the Parish of Moulton, in the County of Northampton. (Repealed by Northampton Act 1988 (c.xxix))
Letcomb Basset or Upper Letcomb and Childrey (Berkshire) Inclosure Act 1772	12 Geo. 3. c. 140 Pr.	3 June 1772
An Act for dividing and allotting the Common Fields, Common Meadows, Downs, and Commonable Lands, in the several Parishes of Letcomb Basset, otherwise Upper Letcomb, and Childrey, in the County of Berks.
Great and Little Stainton, Newbiggin and Great Blencow (Cumberland) Inclosure Act 1772	12 Geo. 3. c. 141 Pr.	3 June 1772
An Act for dividing and enclosing the Common and Waste Grounds, and Open and Common Fields, within the Townships or Hamlets of Great and Little Stainton, Newbiggin, and Great Blencow, in the Barony of Greystock, in the County of Cumberland.
Charlton Inclosure Act 1772	12 Geo. 3. c. 142 Pr.	3 June 1772
An Act for dividing and enclosing the Open and Common Fields, Common Pastures, Common Meadows, and Commonable Lands, of and within the Hamlet and Liberties of Charlton, in the Parishes of Newbottle and King’s Sutton, or One of them, in the County of Northampton.
Royston Inclosure Act 1772	12 Geo. 3. c. 143 Pr.	3 June 1772
An Act for dividing and enclosing certain Commons or Moors, within the Township of Royston, in the County of York.
Russel's Estate Act 1772	12 Geo. 3. c. 144 Pr.	9 June 1772
An Act for vesting in William Russel and his Heirs, in Fee-Simple, several Messuages Lands, and Hereditaments, in the County of Worcester, comprised in his Marriage Settlement, discharged from the Uses of the said Settlement; and for settling other Messuages, Lands, and Hereditaments, of the said William Russel, in the County of Warwick, of greater Value in Lieu thereof; and for other the Purposes therein mentioned.
Robinson's Estate Act 1772	12 Geo. 3. c. 145 Pr.	9 June 1772
An Act for enrolling, in the Court of Chancery in Great Britain, an Exemplification of the Will of Christopher Robinson, late of the Colony of Virginia in America deceased, to be made under the Provincial Seal of the said Colony; and for making Copies of such Enrollment Evidence in Great Britain; for enfranchising certain Copyhold Estates, late the Property of the said Christopher Robinson, in the County of York; and for making Satisfaction to the Prebendary of Dunnington for the same, and for other Purposes.

=== Sources ===
- "12 George III - 1772". The Statutes at Large. Vol. 29. Cambridge, Printed by J. Bentham. 1762 – via Internet Archive.
- "12 George III - 1772". The Statutes at Large. Vol. 29. 1771 – via Google Books.
- Journals of the House of Commons. Vol. 33. London: His Majesty's Stationery Office. 1804. pp. 409–958 – via Google Books.
- Journals of the House of Commons. Vol. 33. London: His Majesty's Stationery Office. 1804. pp. 409–958 – via HathiTrust.
- Chronological Table of and Index to the Statutes. Vol. 1: To the End of the Session 59 Vict. Sess. 2 (1895) (13th ed.). London: Her Majesty's Stationery Office. 1896. pp. 128–129 – via Google Books.
- "Acts of the Parliament of Great Britain from 1772". legislation.gov.uk. The National Archives.

== 13 Geo. 3 ==
The sixth session of the 13th Parliament of Great Britain, which met from 26 November 1772 until 1 July 1773.

This session was also traditionally cited as 13 G. 3.

=== Public acts ===
Short title	Citation	Royal assent
Long title
Importation and Exportation Act 1772 (repealed)	13 Geo. 3. c. 1	3 December 1772
An Act for allowing the Importation of Wheat, Wheat-Flour, Rye, Rye-Meal, Barley-Meal, Oats, Oat-Meal, Peas, Beans, Tares, Callivancies, and all other Sorts of Pulse, from any Part of Europe or Africa into this Kingdom for a limited Time, free of Duty. (Repealed by Statute Law Revision Act 1871 (34 & 35 Vict. c. 116))
Importation and Exportation (No. 2) Act 1772 (repealed)	13 Geo. 3. c. 2	3 December 1772
An Act for allowing the Importation of Wheat, Wheat-Flour, Indian Corn, Indian Meal, Biscuit, Peas, Beans, Tares, Callivancies, and all other Sorts of Pulse, from His Majesty's Colonies in America into this Kingdom for a limited Time, free of Duty. (Repealed by Statute Law Revision Act 1871 (34 & 35 Vict. c. 116))
Importation and Exportation (No. 3) Act 1772 (repealed)	13 Geo. 3. c. 3	14 December 1772
An Act to prohibit the Exportation of Corn, Grain, Pease, Beans, Meal, Malt, Flour, Bread, Biscuit, and Starch; and also, the Extraction of Low Wines and Spirits from Wheat and Wheat-Flour, for a limited Time. (Repealed by Statute Law Revision Act 1871 (34 & 35 Vict. c. 116))
Importation and Exportation (No. 4) Act 1772 (repealed)	13 Geo. 3. c. 4	14 December 1772
An Act to continue for a further Time an Act, made in the Eighth Year of His present Majesty's Reign, (Note: Importation Act 1768 (8 Geo. 3. c. 9)) intituled, "An Act to continue and amend an Act, made in the Fifth Year of the Reign of His present Majesty, (Note: Importation Act 1765 (5 Geo. 3. c. 1)) intituled, 'An Act for Importation of Salted Beef, Pork, Bacon, and Butter, from Ireland, for a limited Time;'" and for allowing the Importation of Salted Beef, Pork, Bacon, and Butter, from the British Dominions in America, for a limited Time. (Repealed by Statute Law Revision Act 1871 (34 & 35 Vict. c. 116))
Importation and Exportation (No. 5) Act 1772 (repealed)	13 Geo. 3. c. 5	14 December 1772
An Act to continue for a further Time an Act, made in the Seventh Year of His present Majesty's Reign, intituled, "An Act to discontinue, for a limited Time, the Duties payable upon the Importation of Tallow, Hogs-Lard, and Grease;" (Note: Importation (No. 6) Act 1766 (7 Geo. 3. c. 12)) and to permit the Importation of Salted Beef, Pork, Bacon, Hams, and Cheese, into this Kingdom, from any Part of Europe, for a limited Time, free of Duty. (Repealed by Statute Law Revision Act 1871 (34 & 35 Vict. c. 116))
Malt Duties Act 1772 (repealed)	13 Geo. 3. c. 6	21 December 1772
An Act for continuing and granting to His Majesty certain Duties upon Malt, Mum, Cyder, and Perry, for the Service of the Year One thousand seven hundred and seventy-three. (Repealed by Statute Law Revision Act 1871 (34 & 35 Vict. c. 116))
Importation (No. 3) Act 1772 (repealed)	13 Geo. 3. c. 7	24 December 1772
An Act for allowing the free Importation of Rice into this Kingdom, from any of His Majesty's Colonies in America, for a limited Time; and for encouraging the making of Starch from Rice. (Repealed by Statute Law Revision Act 1871 (34 & 35 Vict. c. 116))
Land Tax (No. 2) Act 1772 (repealed)	13 Geo. 3. c. 8	21 December 1772
An Act for granting an Aid to His Majesty by a Land Tax, to be raised in Great Britain, for the Service of the Year One thousand seven hundred and seventy-three. (Repealed by Statute Law Revision Act 1871 (34 & 35 Vict. c. 116))
East India Company (No. 2) Act 1772 (repealed)	13 Geo. 3. c. 9	24 December 1772
An Act to restrain the East India Company, for a limited Time from making any Appointment of Commissioners for superintending and regulating the Company's Affairs at their Presidencies in the East Indies. (Repealed by Statute Law Revision Act 1871 (34 & 35 Vict. c. 116))
Mutiny (No. 2) Act 1772 (repealed)	13 Geo. 3. c. 10	24 December 1772
An Act for Punishing Mutiny and Desertion; and for the better Payment of the Army and their Quarters. (Repealed by Statute Law Revision Act 1871 (34 & 35 Vict. c. 116))
Marine Mutiny (No. 2) Act 1772 (repealed)	13 Geo. 3. c. 11	24 December 1772
An Act for the Regulation of His Majesty’s Marine Forces while on Shore. (Repealed by Statute Law Revision Act 1871 (34 & 35 Vict. c. 116))
Indemnity (No. 2) Act 1772 (repealed)	13 Geo. 3. c. 12	16 March 1773
An Act to indemnify such Persons as have omitted to qualify themselves for Offices and Employments within the Time limited by Law, and for giving further Time for that Purpose; and to give further Time to such Persons as have omitted to make and file Affidavits of the Execution of Contracts of Clerks to Attornies and Solicitors. (Repealed by Promissory Oaths Act 1871 (34 & 35 Vict. c. 48))
Gunpowder Mill, Tonbridge Act 1772 (repealed)	13 Geo. 3. c. 13	16 March 1773
An Act to enable certain Persons therein-named, to continue to work a Pestle Mill heretofore employed and used in making Battle Gunpowder at Old Forge Farm, in the Parish of Tonbridge, in the County of Kent. (Repealed by Statute Law Revision Act 1871 (34 & 35 Vict. c. 116))
West Indian Mortgages Act 1772 (repealed)	13 Geo. 3. c. 14	16 March 1773
An Act to encourage the Subjects of Foreign States to lend Money upon the Security of Freehold or Leasehold Estates in any of His Majesty’s Colonies in the West Indies; and to render the Securities granted to such Aliens effectual for recovering Payment of the Money so to be lent by Sale of such Freehold or Leasehold Estate. (Repealed by Statute Law Revision Act 1871 (34 & 35 Vict. c. 116))
Gravesend Streets Act 1772 (repealed)	13 Geo. 3. c. 15	16 March 1773
An Act for paving, cleansing, and lighting, the High Street, East Street, and West Street, in the Town and Parishes of Gravesend and Milton, in the County of Kent; and for lighting the other Streets; and for removing all Encroachments and Annoyances within the said Town and Parishes. (Repealed by Gravesend and Milton Improvement Act 1833 (3 & 4 Will. 4. c. li))
Devon Shire Hall Act 1772	13 Geo. 3. c. 16	16 March 1773
An Act for taking down the Shire Hall of the County of Devon, and for building a New Shire Hall in a more commodious Manner.
Lord Blessington's Will Act 1772 (repealed)	13 Geo. 3. c. 17	16 March 1773
An Act for making the Exemplification of, the last Will and Testament of William Earl of Blesinton, in the Kingdom of Ireland, deceased, Evidence as well in Ireland as in Great Britain. (Repealed by Statute Law (Repeals) Act 1977 (c. 18))
Devon (Poor Relief) Act 1772 (repealed)	13 Geo. 3. c. 18	16 March 1773
An Act to repeal an Act, passed in the Ninth Year of the Reign of His present Majesty, intituled, "An Act for the more effectual Relief of the Poor in the County of Devon;" (Note: Devonshire (Poor Relief) Act 1769 (9 Geo. 3. c. 82)) and for other Purposes therein mentioned. (Repealed by Statute Law Revision Act 1948 (11 & 12 Geo. 6. c. 62))
Isle of Ely, etc. (Drainage) Act 1772 (repealed)	13 Geo. 3. c. 19	16 March 1773
An Act to amend and render more effectual an Act, passed in the Twenty-second Year of the Reign of His late Majesty King George the Second, intituled, "An Act for draining and improving certain Fen Lands within the Manor and Parishes of Upwell and Outwell, and in the Parishes of Denver and Welney, in the Isle of Ely and Counties of Cambridge, and Norfolk" (Note: Denver, etc. (Norfolk and Cambridge) Drainage Act 1748 (22 Geo. 2. c. 16)) so far as the same relates to the Lands lying on the South Side of Popham's Eau. (Repealed by Upwell, Outwell, Denver and Wellney Drainage Act 1801 (41 Geo. 3. (U.K.) c. xxxiv))
Isle of Ely, etc. (Drainage) (No. 2) Act 1772 (repealed)	13 Geo. 3. c. 20	16 March 1773
An Act to amend and render more effectual an Act, made in the Thirty-third Year of the Reign of His late Majesty King George the Second, intituled, "An Act for draining and preserving certain Fen Lands and Low Grounds in the Isle of Ely and Counties of Suffolk and Norfolk, between Mildenhall River South, Plant Load and Brandon River North, bounded on the West by the River Ouse, and on the East by Winter Load, Earswell Brook, and the Hard Lands of Mildenhall, and for empowering the Governor, Bailiffs, and Commonalty of the Company of Conservators of the Great Level of the Fens, commonly called Bedford Level, to sell certain Fen Lands lying within the Limits aforesaid, commonly called Invested Lands;" (Note: Isle of Ely, Suffolk, Norfolk Drainage Act 1759 (33 Geo. 2. c. 32)) so far as the same relates to the several Fen Lands and Low Grounds lying in the First District described in the said Act. (Repealed by Isle of Ely (Mildenhall River) Drainage Act 1807 (47 Geo. 3 Sess. 2. c. lxxxiii))
British Nationality Act 1772 (repealed)	13 Geo. 3. c. 21	16 March 1773
An Act to extend the Provisions of an Act, made in the Fourth Year of the Reign of His late Majesty King George the Second, (Note: British Nationality Act 1730 (4 Geo. 2. c. 21)) intituled, "An Act to explain a Clause in an Act, made in the Seventh Year of the Reign of Her late Majesty Queen Anne, (Note: Foreign Protestants Naturalization Act 1708 (7 Ann. c. 5)) for naturalizing Foreign Protestants, which relates to the Children of the natural-born Subjects of the Crown of England, or of Great Britain, to the Children of such Children. (Repealed by British Nationality and Status of Aliens Act 1914 (4 & 5 Geo. 5. c. 17))
Coal Loading (Newcastle and Sunderland) Act 1772	13 Geo. 3. c. 22	1 April 1773
An Act to continue an Act, made in the Sixth Year of His present Majesty, intituled, "An Act to regulate the Loading of Ships with Coals in the Ports of Newcastle and Sunderland." (Note: Coal Loading (Newcastle and Sunderland) Act 1766 (6 Geo. 3. c. 22))
Militia Pay Act 1772 (repealed)	13 Geo. 3. c. 23	1 April 1773
An Act for defraying the Charge of the Pay and Cloathing of the Militia in that Part of Great Britain called England, for One Year, beginning the Twenty-fifth Day of March One thousand seven hundred and seventy-three. (Repealed by Statute Law Revision Act 1861 (24 & 25 Vict. c. 101))
Mutiny in America (No. 2) Act 1772 (repealed)	13 Geo. 3. c. 24	1 April 1773
An Act for further continuing Two Acts, made in the Sixth (Note: Mutiny in America Act 1766 (6 Geo. 3. c. 18)) and Ninth (Note: Mutiny in America Act 1769 (9 Geo. 3. c. 18)) Years of His Majesty's Reign, for punishing Mutiny and Desertion; and for the better Payment of the Army and their Quarters in His Majesty's Dominions in America. (Repealed by Statute Law Revision Act 1871 (34 & 35 Vict. c. 116))
Naturalization Act 1772 (repealed)	13 Geo. 3. c. 25	1 April 1773
An Act to explain Two Acts of Parliament, One of the Thirteenth Year of the Reign of His late Majesty, (Note: Naturalization Act 1739 (13 Geo. 2. c. 7)) for naturalizing such Foreign Protectants and others, as are settled, or shall settle, in any of His Majesty's Colonies in America; and the other of the Second Year of the Reign of His present Majesty, (Note: American Protestant Soldier Naturalization Act 1762 (2 Geo. 3. c. 25)) for naturalizing such Foreign Protectants as have served, or shall serve as Officers or Soldiers in His Majesty's Royal American Regiment, or as Engineers in America. (Repealed by Naturalization Act 1870 (33 & 34 Vict. c. 14))
British Ships Act 1772 (repealed)	13 Geo. 3. c. 26	1 April 1773
An Act for preventing Abuses in the Sale of Shares of British Built Ships to Foreigners. (Repealed by Statute Law Revision Act 1871 (34 & 35 Vict. c. 116))
Exeter Small Debts Act 1772 (repealed)	13 Geo. 3. c. 27	1 April 1773
An Act for the more easy and speedy Recovery of Small Debts within the City and County of the City of Exeter. (Repealed by County Courts Act 1846 (9 & 10 Vict. c. 95))
Greenock Water Supply, etc. Act 1772 (repealed)	13 Geo. 3. c. 28	1 April 1773
An Act for deepening, cleansing, and making more commodious the Harbours of the Town of Greenock; for supplying the Inhabitants with fresh and wholesome Water and for paving, cleansing, lighting, and watching the Streets and other publick Places within the said Town. (Repealed by Greenock Improvement Act 1840 (3 & 4 Vict. c. xxvii) and Greenock Port and Harbour Act 1866 (29 & 30 Vict. c. clvi))
Aberdeen Harbour Act 1772 (repealed)	13 Geo. 3. c. 29	1 April 1773
An Act for deepening, cleansing, and making more commodious the Harbour of Aberdeen; for erecting new Piers and Quays therein; and for regulating Ships and Vessels trading into and going out of the said Harbour. (Repealed by Aberdeen Harbour Act 1829 (10 Geo. 4. c. xxxiv))
King's Lynn Pilotage Act 1772 (repealed)	13 Geo. 3. c. 30	7 April 1773
An Act for the better Regulation and Government of the Pilots conducting Ships and Vessels to and out of the Port of King's Lynn, and of the Bridgemen conducting Gangs of Lighters or Barge to and from the same, and for laying down Moorings in the Harbour of the Said Port, and for preventing Mischiefs by Fire therein. (Repealed by Pilotage Orders Confirmation (No. 1) Act 1922 (12 & 13 Geo. 5. c. xxxvii))
Criminal Law Act 1772 (repealed)	13 Geo. 3. c. 31	1 April 1773
An Act for the more effectual Execution of the Criminal Laws in the Two Parts of the United Kingdom. (Repealed by Statute Law Revision Act 1872 (35 & 36 Vict. c. 63))
Stealing of Vegetables Act 1772 (repealed)	13 Geo. 3. c. 32	1 April 1773
An Act for repealing so much of an Act, made in the Twenty-third Year of His late Majesty King George the Second, (Note: Continuance of Laws, etc. Act 1749 (23 Geo. 2. c. 26)) as relates to the preventing the stealing or destroying of Turnips; and for the more effectually preventing the stealing or destroying of Turnips, Potatoes, Cabbages, Parsnips, Pease, and Carrots. (Repealed by Statute Law Revision Act 1959 (7 & 8 Eliz. 2. c. 68))
Preservation of Timber Act 1772 (repealed)	13 Geo. 3. c. 33	7 April 1773
An Act to extend the Provisions of an Act, made in the Sixth Year of His present Majesty's Reign, intituled, "An Act for the better Preservation of Timber Trees, and of Woods and Underwoods, and for the further Preservation of Roots, Shrubs, and Plants," (Note: Preservation of Timber Trees Act 1766 (6 Geo. 3. c. 48)) to Poplar, Alder, Maple, Larch, and Hornbeam. (Repealed by Statute Law Revision Act 1861 (24 & 25 Vict. c. 101))
Brighton Improvement Act 1772 or the Brighton Streets Act 1772 or the Brighton Town Act 1773 (repealed)	13 Geo. 3. c. 34	7 April 1773
An Act for paving, lighting, and cleaning the Streets, Lanes, and Places, within the Town of Brighthelmstone, (Note: Brighthelmstone is now known as Brighton.) in the County of Sussex; for removing Nuisances and Annoyances, and preventing the like for the future; for holding and regulating a Market within the said Town; for building and repairing Groyns, in order to render the Coast safe and commodious for Ships or Vessels to unload and land Sea Coal, Culm, and other Coal, for the Use of the Inhabitants of the said Town, and for laying a Duty thereon: and for other Purposes. (Repealed by Brighthelmstone Improvement Act 1810 (50 Geo. 3. c. xxxviii) and Brighthelmston Improvement and Poor Relief Act 1825 (6 Geo. 4. c. clxxix))
Essex Gaol Act 1772 (repealed)	13 Geo. 3. c. 35	7 April 1773
An Act for raising a further Sum of Money for the Purpose of rebuilding the Common Gaol of the County of Essex. (Repealed by Statute Law (Repeals) Act 2008 (c. 12))
Birmingham Improvement Act 1772 (repealed)	13 Geo. 3. c. 36	7 April 1773
An Act to amend an Act, passed in the Ninth Year of His present Majesty, intituled, "An Act for laying open and widening certain Ways and Passages within the Town of Birmingham, and for cleaning and lighting the Streets, Lanes, Ways, and Passages there; and for removing and preventing Nuisances and Obstructions therein;" (Note: Birmingham Improvement Act 1769 (9 Geo. 3. c. 83)) and for widening certain other Streets and Places; for establishing a Nightly Watch; and for regulating Carts and Carmen employed in the said Town. (Repealed by Birmingham Improvement Act 1812 (52 Geo. 3. c. cxiii))
North River, Norfolk Navigation Act 1772	13 Geo. 3. c. 37	7 April 1773
An Act for making and extending the Navigation of the River Bure, (commonly called The North River), by and from Coltishall, to Aylsliam Bridge, in the County of Norfolk.
Plate Glass Manufacture Act 1772 (repealed)	13 Geo. 3. c. 38	7 April 1773
An Act to incorporate Certain Persons, therein named, and their successors, with proper Powers, for the Purpose of establishing One or more Glass Manufactories within the Kingdom of Great Britain, (Note: British Cast Plate Manufacturers Company.) and for the more effectually supporting and conducting the same upon an improved Plan, in a peculiar Manner calculated for the calling of large Plate Glass. (Repealed by Statute Law Revision Act 1953 (2 & 3 Eliz. 2. c. 5))
Huntingdon Drainage Act 1772	13 Geo. 3. c. 39	7 April 1773
An Act for draining and preserving certain Fen Lands and Low Grounds, called King's Delph and Eight Roods, and also other Fen Lands and Low Grounds in a certain Place called Farcett Fen adjoining thereto, lying near to the Hamlet and Village of Farcett and Standground, in the County of Huntingdon.
Bedford Level (Drainage) Act 1772	13 Geo. 3. c. 40	7 April 1773
An Act tor amending and rendering more effectual an Act, made in the Twenty-seventh Year of the Reign of His late Majesty King George the Second, intituled, "An Act for discharging the Corporation of the Governor, Bailiffs, and Commonalty of the Company of Conservators of the Great Level of the Fens, commonly called Bedford Level, from a Debt due to the Duke of Bedford and Earl of Lincoln; and for enabling the Proprietors of Lands in the North Level, Part of the said Great Level, to raise Money, to discharge the Proportion of the said North Level in the Debts of the said Corporation and for ascertaining and appropriating the Taxes to be laid on the said North Level; and for the more effectual draining and preserving the said North Level and divers Lands adjoining thereto, in the Manor of Crowland;" (Note: Bedford Level Act 1754 (27 Geo. 2. c. 19)) so far as the same relates to the several Fen Lands lying in the Second District in the said Act described.
Cox's Museum Act 1772 (repealed)	13 Geo. 3. c. 41	10 May 1773
An Act for enabling James Cox, Jeweller, to dispose of his Museum, commonly called Cox's Museum, by Way of Chance, in such Manner as may be most for the Benefit of himself and his Creditors. (Repealed by Statute Law Revision Act 1948 (11 & 12 Geo. 6. c. 62))
Petersham Streets Act 1772	13 Geo. 3. c. 42	10 May 1773
An Act for amending, lighting, and watching, the Highways or Roads within the Town, Village, or Chapelry, of Petersham, in the County of Surry.
Corn Act 1772 (repealed)	13 Geo. 3. c. 43	10 May 1773
An Act to regulate the Importation and Exportation of Corn. (Repealed for England and Wales and Scotland by Importation and Exportation (No. 2) Act 1791 (31 Geo. 3. c. 30) and for Northern Ireland by Statute Law Revision Act 1953 (2 & 3 Eliz. 2. c. 5))
Customs Act 1772 or the Tea Act 1773 (repealed)	13 Geo. 3. c. 44	10 May 1773
An Act to allow a Drawback of the Duties of Customs on the Exportation of Tea to any of His Majesty's Colonies or Plantations in America; to increase the Deposit on Bohea Tea to be sold at the India Company's Sales; and to empower the Commissioners of the Treasury to grant Licences to the East India Company to export Tea Duty-free. (Repealed by Statute Law Revision Act 1861 (24 & 25 Vict. c. 101))
Bedford Level (Drainage) (No. 2) Act 1772	13 Geo. 3. c. 45	10 May 1773
An Act for draining and preserving certain Fen Lands and Low Grounds, lying in the South Level, Part of the Great Level of the Fens commonly called Bedford Level, between certain old Rivers or Drains called Stoke River and Brandon River, and a certain Level or District called Feltwell New District, and the Hardlands of Woodhall in Helgay, and Helgay, in the Counties of Norfolk and Suffolk.
Yaxley (Drainage) Act 1772	13 Geo. 3. c. 46	28 May 1773
An Act for the more effectual draining and preserving certain Fen Lands and Low Grounds, in the Parish of Yaxley, in the County of Huntingdon.
Skipton Canal Act 1772	13 Geo. 3. c. 47	10 May 1773
An Act to enable the Right Honourable Sackville Earl of Thanet to make a navigable Cut or Canal from a Place called The Spring, lying near Skipton Castle, in the County of York, to join to and communicate with the navigable Canal from Leeds to Liverpoole, in a Close called Hebble End Close, in the Township of Skipton, in the said County of York.
Saint Marylebone (Streets) Act 1772 (repealed)	13 Geo. 3. c. 48	28 May 1773
An Act for amending and rendering more effectual Two Acts, made, One in the Eighth (Note: Marylebone Improvement Act 1768 (8 Geo. 3. c. 46)) and the other in the Tenth (Note: Saint Marylebone (Improvement) Act 1770 (10 Geo. 3. c. 23)) Year of His present Majesty's Reign, for regulating the Nightly Watch and Beadles; and for paving, repairing, cleansing, and lighting, the Parish of Saint Mary le Bone, in the County of Middlesex; and for other Purposes in the said Acts mentioned. (Repealed by Saint Marylebone Improvement Act 1795 (35 Geo. 3. c. 73))
Bedford Level (Drainage) (No. 3) Act 1772	13 Geo. 3. c. 49	28 May 1773
An Act for more effectually executing an Act, passed in the Twenty-seventh Year of King George the Second, for draining and preserving the Lands in the North Level, Part of Bedford Level; so far as relates to the Fourth District of the said North Level.
Southampton Poor Relief Act 1772 (repealed)	13 Geo. 3. c. 50	28 May 1773
An Act for better regulating the Poor, and repairing the Highways, within the Town and County of the Town of Southampton. (Repealed by Local Government Board's Provisional Order Confirmation (Poor Law) Act 1909 (9 Edw. 7. c. cxvi))
Frivolous Suits Act 1772 (repealed)	13 Geo. 3. c. 51	28 May 1773
An Act to discourage the Practice of commencing frivolous and vexatious Suits in His Majesty's Courts at Westminster, in Causes of Action arising within the Dominion of Wales; and for further regulating the Proceedings in the Courts of Great Sessions in Wales. (Repealed by Statute Law Revision Act 1861 (24 & 25 Vict. c. 101))
Plate Assay (Sheffield and Birmingham) Act 1772 or the Sheffield Assay Office Act 1773	13 Geo. 3. c. 52	28 May 1773
An Act for appointing Wardens and Assay-Masters for assaying Wrought Plate, in the Towns of Sheffield and Birmingham.
Bethnal Green (Poor Relief) Act 1772 (repealed)	13 Geo. 3. c. 53	28 May 1773
An Act to enable the Inhabitants of the Parish of Saint Matthew Bethnal Green, in the County of Middlesex, to pay Debts already contracted in finishing and furnishing their Workhouse, and on Account of the Poor of the said Parish, and for their further Relief. (Repealed by St. Matthew's Bethnal Green Parish Officers Act 1823 (4 Geo. 4. c. xxi) and London Government (Borough of Bethnal Green) Order in Council 1901 (SR&O 1901/212))
Game (Scotland) Act 1772 (repealed)	13 Geo. 3. c. 54	21 June 1773
An Act for the more effectual Preservation of the Game in that Part of Great Britain called Scotland; and for repealing and amending several of the Laws now in being relative thereto. (Repealed by Statute Law Revision Act 1871 (34 & 35 Vict. c. 116), Statute Law Revision Act 1888 (51 & 52 Vict. c. 3), Heather Burning (Scotland) Act 1926 (16 & 17 Geo. 5. c. 30), the National Assistance (Adaptation of Enactments) Regulations 1952 (SI 1952/1334), Protection of Birds Act 1954 (2 & 3 Eliz. 2. c. 30) and Wildlife and Natural Environment (Scotland) Act 2011 (asp 6))
Game (England) Act 1772 (repealed)	13 Geo. 3. c. 55	21 June 1773
An Act to explain and amend the several Laws now in being, so far as the same relate to the Preservation of the Moor or Hill Game. (Repealed by Game Act 1831 (1 & 2 Will. 4. c. 32))
Sale of Spirits, etc. Act 1772 (repealed)	13 Geo. 3. c. 56	21 June 1773
An Act for the mote effectually restraining the retailing of Distilled Spirituous Liquors; and for preventing the forging or counterfeiting any Stamp or Seal used for marking Silks, Callicoes, Linens, and Stuffs, to be printed, painted, stained, or dyed, in Great Britain. (Repealed by Statute Law Revision Act 1871 (34 & 35 Vict. c. 116))
Paper Currency in America Act 1772 or the Currency Act 1773 (repealed)	13 Geo. 3. c. 57	21 June 1773
An Act to explain and amend an Act, made in the Fourth Year of His present Majesty, intituled, "An Act to prevent Paper Bills of Credit hereafter to be issued in any of His Majesty Colonies or Plantations in America, from being declared to be a legal Tender in Payments of Money; and to prevent the legal Tender of such Bills as are now subsisting from being prolonged beyond the Periods limited for calling in and sinking the same." (Note: Paper Bills of Credit Act 1763 (4 Geo. 3. c. 34)) (Repealed by Coinage Act 1870 (33 & 34 Vict. c. 10))
Gaols Act 1772 (repealed)	13 Geo. 3. c. 58	21 June 1773
An Act for providing Clergymen to officiate in Gaols within that Part of Great Britain called England. (Repealed by Statute Law Revision Act 1861 (24 & 25 Vict. c. 101))
Plate (Offences) Act 1772 (repealed)	13 Geo. 3. c. 59	21 June 1773
An Act for repealing so much of an Act of the Thirty-first Year of His late Majesty, (Note: Plate (Duty on Dealer's Licence) Act 1757 (31 Geo. 2. c. 32)) as inflict Capital Punishment for Frauds and Abuses in the marking or stamping of Gold or Silver Plate; and for inflicting another Punishment for the said Offence. (Repealed by Hallmarking Act 1973 (c. 43))
Isle of Ely, etc. (Drainage) (No. 3) Act 1772	13 Geo. 3. c. 60	21 June 1773
An Act for draining and preserving certain Lands and Grounds in the Parishes of Tid Saint Giles and Newton, in the Isle of Ely, in the County of Cambridge, and in Tid Saint Mary's, in the County of Lincoln.
Kingston-upon-Thames (Streets) Act 1772 (repealed)	13 Geo. 3. c. 61	21 June 1773
An Act for the better lighting and watching, the Town of Kingston upon Thames, in the County of Surrey, and for removing and preventing all Obstructions, Encroachments, and Nuisances therein. (Repealed by Kingston-upon-Thames Improvement Act 1855 (18 & 19 Vict. c. xlv) (Note: Incorrectly cited as "18-9 V c xiv" in the Chronological Table of the Statutes.))
Bread Act 1772 (repealed)	13 Geo. 3. c. 62	21 June 1773
An Act for better regulating the Assize and making of Bread. (Repealed by Statute Law Revision Act 1861 (24 & 25 Vict. c. 101))
East India Company Act 1772 or the Regulating Act 1773 or the India Act 1773 (repealed)	13 Geo. 3. c. 63	21 June 1773
An Act for establishing certain Regulations for the better Management of the Affairs of the East India Company, as well in India as in Europe. (Repealed by Government of India Act 1915 (5 & 6 Geo. 5. c. 61) and Government of India (Amendment) Act 1916 (6 & 7 Geo. 5. c. 37))
East India Company (No. 4) Act 1772 (repealed)	13 Geo. 3. c. 64	1 July 1773
An Act for granting to His Majesty a Sum of Money to be raised by Exchequer Bills, and to be advanced and applied in the Manner, and upon the Terms therein mentioned, for the Relief of the United Company of Merchants of England trading to the East Indies. (Repealed by Statute Law Revision Act 1871 (34 & 35 Vict. c. 116))
Newspaper Duty Act 1772 (repealed)	13 Geo. 3. c. 65	1 July 1773
An Act for explaining Two Acts, made in the Eleventh Year of the Reign of King George the First, (Note: Taxation Act 1724 (11 Geo. 1. c. 4)) and the Thirtieth Year of the Reign of His late Majesty, (Note: Taxation Act 1739 (13 Geo. 2. c. 1)) in relation to the Stamp Duties upon Newspapers. (Repealed by Stamp Duties on Newspapers Act 1836 (6 & 7 Will. 4. c. 76))
Unfunded Debt Act 1772 (repealed)	13 Geo. 3. c. 66	1 July 1773
An Act for raising a certain Sum of Money by Loans or Exchequer Bills, for the Service of the Year One thousand, seven hundred and seventy-three. (Repealed by Statute Law Revision Act 1871 (34 & 35 Vict. c. 116))
Importation (No. 4) Act 1772 (repealed)	13 Geo. 3. c. 67	1 July 1773
An Act for laying an additional Duty on Paper printed, painted, or stained, in Foreign Parts, imported into this Kingdom. (Repealed by Statute Law Revision Act 1861 (24 & 25 Vict. c. 101))
Silk Manufactures Act 1772 (repealed)	13 Geo. 3. c. 68	1 July 1773
An Act to empower the Magistrates therein mentioned to settle and regulate the Wages of Persons employed in the Silk Manufacture, within their respective Jurisdictions. (Repealed by Silk Manufactures Act 1824 (5 Geo. 4. c. 66))
Importation and Exportation (No. 6) Act 1772 (repealed)	13 Geo. 3. c. 69	1 July 1773
An Act for further continuing an Act, made in the Fourth Year of the Reign of his present Majesty, (Note: Importation into Quebec Act 1763 (4 Geo. 3. c. 19)) for importing Salt from Europe, into the Province of Quebec in America, for a limited Time. (Repealed by Statute Law Revision Act 1871 (34 & 35 Vict. c. 116))
Importation and Exportation (No. 7) Act 1772 (repealed)	13 Geo. 3. c. 70	1 July 1773
An Act to continue an Act, made in the Thirty-first Year of the Reign of His late Majesty King George the Second, intituled, "An Act for the Encouragement of the Exportation of Culm to Lisbon, in the Kingdom of Portugal;" (Note: Exportation (No. 3) Act 1757 (31 Geo. 2. c. 15)) and for chargeing a higher Duty upon Culm exported thither in Foreign Shipping. (Repealed by Statute Law Revision Act 1871 (34 & 35 Vict. c. 116))
Counterfeiting, etc., of Gold Coin Act 1772 (repealed)	13 Geo. 3. c. 71	1 July 1773
An Act for the better preventing the counterfeiting, clipping, and other diminishing, the Gold Coin of this Kingdom. (Repealed by Coinage Offences Act 1832 (2 & 3 Will. 4. c. 34))
Importation and Exportation (No. 8) Act 1772 (repealed)	13 Geo. 3. c. 72	1 July 1773
An Act to permit the free Importation of Cod Fish, Ling, and Hake, caught and cured in Chaleur Bay, or any other Part of the Gulph of Saint Lawrence, or on the Coast of Labrador. (Repealed by Statute Law Revision Act 1861 (24 & 25 Vict. c. 101))
Importation and Exportation (No. 9) Act 1772 (repealed)	13 Geo. 3. c. 73	1 July 1773
An Act to continue and amend an Act, made in the Sixth Year of the Reign of His present Majesty, intituled, "An Act for opening and establishing certain Ports in the Islands of Jamaica and Dominica, for the more free Importation and Exportation of certain Goods and Merchandizes; for granting certain Duties to, defray the Expences of opening, maintaining, securing, and improving, such Ports; for ascertaining the Duties to be paid upon the Importation of Goods from the said Island of Dominica into this Kingdom; and for securing the Duties upon Goods imported from the said Island, into any other British Colony;" (Note: Free Ports, West Indies, etc. Act 1766 (6 Geo. 3. c. 49)) and for allowing Timber and Wood to be exported from the said Island of Dominica, into any other of the British Islands, Colonies, or Plantations, in America, for a limited Time. (Repealed by Statute Law Revision Act 1861 (24 & 25 Vict. c. 101))
Tonnage, etc., of Ships, etc. Act 1772 (repealed)	13 Geo. 3. c. 74	1 July 1773
An Act for the better ascertaining the Tonnage and Burthen of Ships and Vessels importing and exporting Goods into and from this Kingdom, or hovering upon the Coasts thereof; for amending so much of an Act, made in the last Session of Parliament, (Note: Customs (No. 1) Act 1772 (12 Geo. 3. c. 50)) for lowering the Duty payable upon the Importation of Oak Bark, as relates to the suing for the Penalties and Forfeitures thereby inflicted in the Court of Exchequer in Scotland; for appropriating the Duty on Oak Bark granted by the said Act; and for obviating Doubts which have arisen with respect to the allowing the Drawback upon certain Callicoes, and the Bounty upon British made Cordage exported to the Islands of Madeira, the Canary Islands, and the Azores or Western Islands. (Repealed by Statute Law Revision Act 1861 (24 & 25 Vict. c. 101))
Adam Buildings Act 1772 (repealed)	13 Geo. 3. c. 75	1 July 1773
An Act for enabling John, Robert, James, and William Adam, to dispose of several Houses and Buildings, in the Parish of Saint Martin in the Fields, and Saint Mary le Bone, in the County of Middlesex, and other their Effects, by Way of Chance, in such Manner as may be most for the Benefit of themselves and Creditors. (Repealed by Statute Law Revision Act 1948 (11 & 12 Geo. 6. c. 62))
Indemnity (No. 3) Act 1772 (repealed)	13 Geo. 3. c. 76	1 July 1773
An Act to indemnify Justices of the Peace, Deputy Lieutenants, and Officers of the Militia, or others, who have omitted to register or deliver in their Qualifications, within the Time limited by Law; and for giving further Time for those Purposes. (Repealed by Statute Law Revision Act 1871 (34 & 35 Vict. c. 116))
Supply, etc. (No. 2) Act 1772 (repealed)	13 Geo. 3. c. 77	1 July 1773
An Act for granting to His Majesty a certain Sum of Money out of the Sinking Fund; and for applying certain Monies therein mentioned, for the Service of the Year One thousand seven hundred and seventy-three; and for further appropriating the Supplies granted in this Session of Parliament; and for paying to John Harrison a further Reward for his Invention of a Time-keeper for ascertaining the Longitude at Sea, and his Discovery of the Principles upon which the same was constructed. (Repealed by Statute Law Revision Act 1871 (34 & 35 Vict. c. 116))

=== Private acts ===
Short title	Citation	Royal assent
Long title
D'Aigremont's Naturalization Act 1772	13 Geo. 3. c. 1 Pr.	21 December 1772
An Act for naturalizing Paul D' Agremont.
Vidal's etc. Naturalization Act 1772	13 Geo. 3. c. 2 Pr.	21 December 1772
An Act for naturalizing Emeric Vidal, Philippe Rivier, and Abraham Favenc.
Martin's Naturalization Act 1772	13 Geo. 3. c. 3 Pr.	21 December 1772
An Act for naturalizing Peter Francis Martin.

=== Sources ===
- Pickering, Danby, ed. (1773). "Anno decimo tertio Georgii III". The Statutes at Large. Vol. 30: To the End of the Thirteenth Parliament of Great Britain. Cambridge: Charles Bathurst. pp. 1–322 – via Internet Archive.
- Pickering, Danby, ed. (1773). "Anno decimo tertio Georgii III". The Statutes at Large. Vol. 30: To the End of the Thirteenth Parliament of Great Britain. Cambridge: Charles Bathurst. pp. 1–322 – via Google Books.
- Pickering, Danby, ed. (1773). "Anno decimo tertio Georgii III". The Statutes at Large. Vol. 30: To the End of the Thirteenth Parliament of Great Britain. Cambridge: Charles Bathurst. pp. 1–322 – via Internet Archive.
- Journals of the House of Commons. Vol. 34. London: His Majesty's Stationery Office. 1804. pp. 3–390 – via Google Books.
- Chronological Table of and Index to the Statutes. Vol. 1: To the End of the Session 59 Vict. Sess. 2 (1895) (13th ed.). London: Her Majesty's Stationery Office. 1896. pp. 129–130 – via Google Books.
- "Acts of the Parliament of Great Britain from 1772". legislation.gov.uk. The National Archives.

== See also ==
- List of acts of the Parliament of Great Britain
