= St Anne's Church, Liverpool (1772–1871) =

Demolished church in Liverpool, England

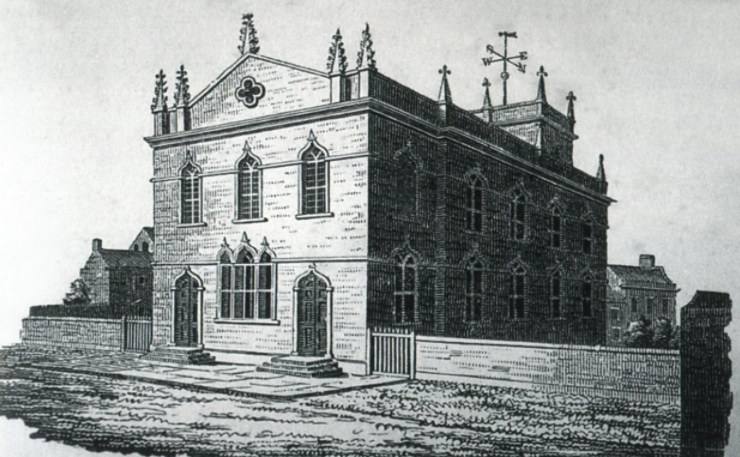
St Anne's Church, Liverpool

St Anne's Church was a Church of England parish opened in Liverpool, on 25 October 1772.

== History ==
It had been built at the expense of Thomas and Richard Dobb, cabinetmakers, of Williamson Square and Henry North, fruit merchant, Dale Street. They owned the land on which it was built. At the time the area was still quite rural. They applied to Parliament of Great Britain for the passage of the Richmond Chapel, Lancashire Act 1772, to enable the completion of the church as a chapel of ease.

The church was located on Richmond Street or Cazneau Street. The church building was replaced with a new one in 1871, with the original location being demolished. The newer church was closed in 1971 and later demolished.

The first rector was Claudius Crigan, who had been an army chaplain in Antigua. He married Mary Harman, the widow of a wealthy slave owner, and retired from the army. The church provided services for wealthy inhabitants of Liverpool, raising money to pay the rector by selling pews for sixty and seventy guineas, with no free pews.

Poet Mary Rolls was married here in 1810. An example of the congregation is Robert Bostock of Tarleton Street, who occupied three pews. Bostock was a ship captain who traded in slaves and various goods. At the time, Liverpool was the largest slave trading port in Britain, surpassing Bristol in the 1740s and peaking around 1780 before the trade was abolished in 1807.
