= Nariva Formation =

Geological formation in Trinidad and Tobago

- Stratigraphic range: Paleocene–Miocene
- Type: Formation

Location
- Coordinates: 10.3°N 61.5°W
- Approximate paleocoordinates: 7.3°N 47.9°W
- Country: Trinidad and Tobago

Type section
- Named for: Nariva River
- Nariva Formation (Trinidad and Tobago)

The Nariva Formation is a geologic formation in Trinidad and Tobago. It preserves fossils dating back to the Paleogene to Neogene periods.

== See also ==
- List of fossiliferous stratigraphic units in Trinidad and Tobago
