= Cyrus Gates =

American abolitionist (1802–1891)

- Born: July 27, 1802; Lisle, New York, U.S.
- Died: December 11, 1891 (aged 89); Nanticoke, New York, U.S.
- Spouse: Arabella Leadbetter (m. 1828)
- Children: 4
- Parent(s): Russell Gates; Esther Briggs
- Relatives: Frederick Taylor Gates (nephew)

Cyrus Gates (July 27, 1802 – December 11, 1891) was an abolitionist, cartographer, and owner of the Cyrus Gates Farmstead in Maine, New York.

== Early life ==
Gates was born on July 27, 1802, in Lisle, New York, near Maine, New York. He was the son of Russell Gates (1766–1839) and Esther (née Briggs) Gates (1761–1850). Under the Boston Purchase of 1786, Cyrus' father and mother had migrated from the East Haddam, Connecticut, area in the early 1790s. His father and uncle Alfred Gates trail blazed the road from Union Center to Nanticoke in order to gain access to their newly purchased property. Cyrus would follow his father by continuing to farm and staying on the land.

== Career ==
Gates worked as a cartographer and surveyor, mapping 15 counties for the State of New York. For several years, he served as the local Justice of the Peace in the then newly formed Town of Maine. Gates was able to grow several crops of produce, including apples, maple sugar, honey, as well as other standard farm produce.

Cyrus would also serve as a deacon in the Maine Baptist church, as he maintained a proactive and sacrificial abolitionist stance.

=== The Underground Railroad ===
Even before Cyrus built his Greek Revival home in 1848 he had taken to harboring runaway slaves. When Cyrus built his new home in 1848 he continued in his activism. He built a secret access door to a hidden part of the attic. If ever needed, this hiding space would add to the safety of runaway slaves that he was harboring at his home.

== Personal life ==
On November 5, 1828, Cyrus married Arabella Leadbetter (1805–1897), the daughter of Thomas Leadbetter (1768–1844). Together, they were the parents of four children:

- Livingston Theodore Gates (1829–1903), who would serve in the U.S. Army during the Civil war and then move on to Wisconsin.
- Byron Chandler Gates (1832–1913), who married Lydia Buck, the sister of Daniel W. Buck, who served as Mayor of Lansing, Michigan,
- Aravesta Clementine Gates (born 1836), who married Alexander Ross.
- Eugene Orestes Gates (1843–1934), who served in the U.S. Navy on the USS Dictator during the Civil War.

Gates died at the age of 89 on December 11, 1891.

=== The Cyrus Gates Farmstead ===
In 1848, when Cyrus was 45 years old, he began building a Greek-inspired farmhouse. He hired a man from New York City named Charles Yarrington to build it. By the standards of the day and Cyrus' rural location, the style of the house would be considered quite extravagant and over-done for a stick frame farmhouse. In fact, the locals feeling somewhat miffed by Cyrus' use of an out of town builder, called the new house "Gates' white elephant." Construction on the building commenced in January 1848. Great x2 Granddaughter of Cyrus-Louis Gates-Gunsalus says that the house was completed enough to be lived in by the end of that year. The inside carpentry and other finish work of the house would not be completed until 1851.
