= Frederick Taylor Gates =

American Baptist clergyman

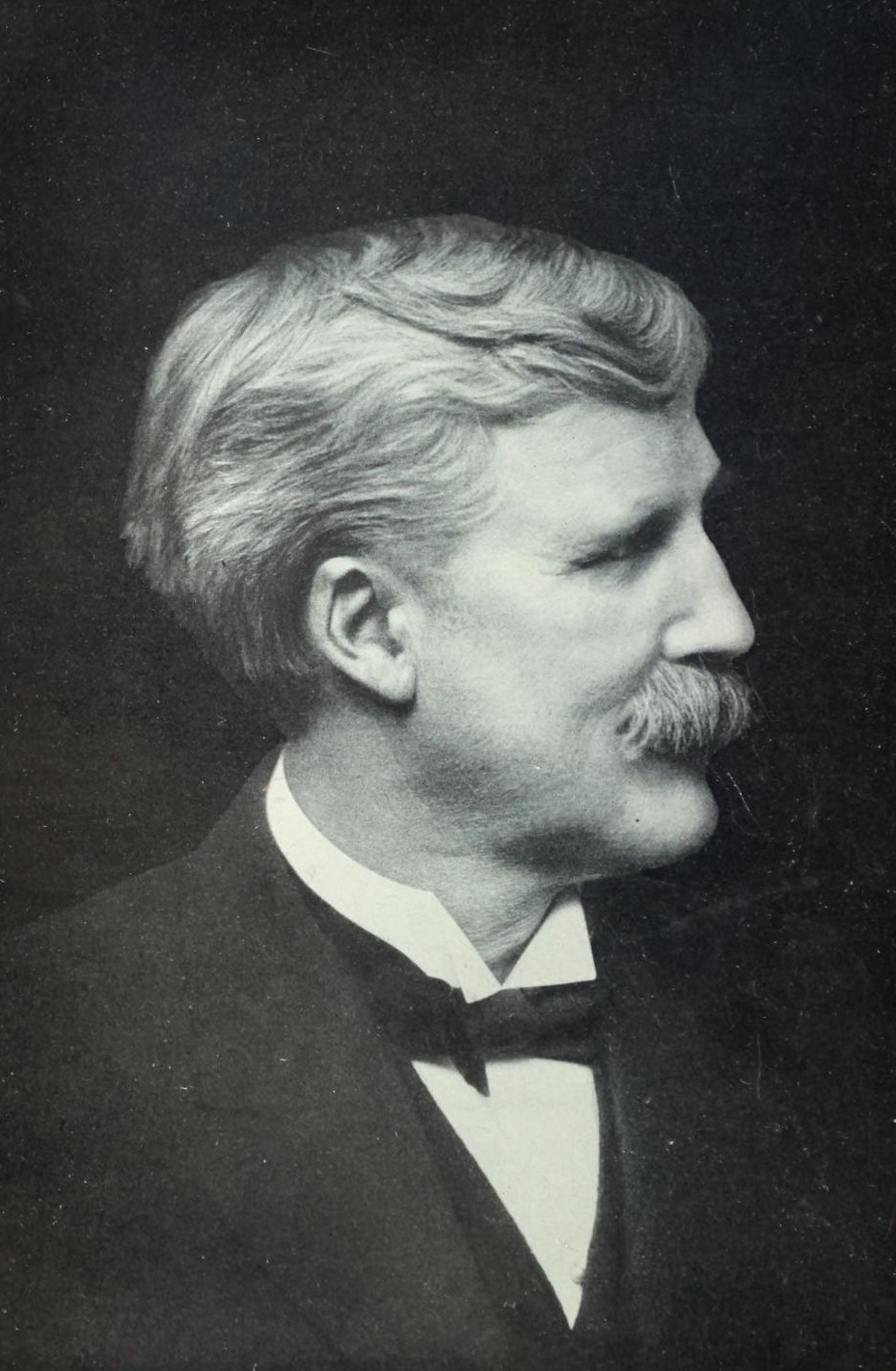
- Born: July 22, 1853; Maine, New York, U.S.
- Died: February 6, 1929 (aged 75); Phoenix, Arizona, U.S.
- Resting place: Mount Hebron Cemetery, Montclair, New Jersey
- Education: University of Rochester; Rochester Theological Seminary
- Spouses: Lucia Fowler Perkins (m. 1882; died 1883) Emma Lucile Cahoon (m. 1886)
- Children: 7
- Parent(s): Granville Gates; Sarah Jane Bowers
- Relatives: Cyrus Gates (uncle)

Frederick Taylor Gates (July 22, 1853, Maine, Broome County, New York – February 6, 1929, Phoenix, Arizona) was an American Baptist clergyman, educator, and the principal business and philanthropic advisor to the major oil industrialist John D. Rockefeller, Sr., from 1891 to 1923.

== Early life ==
Gates was born on July 2, 1853, in Maine, Broome County, New York. He was the son of Granville and Sarah Jane (née Bowers) Gates. His father was a Baptist minister and his neighbor, and uncle, was Cyrus Gates a cartographer, abolitionist and local judge.

He graduated from the University of Rochester in 1877 and from the Rochester Theological Seminary in 1880. He was a member of the Alpha Delta Phi fraternity. From 1880 to 1888, he served as pastor of the Central Baptist Church in Minneapolis, Minnesota. He left the ministry and was appointed the secretary of the newly formed American Baptist Education Society where he championed a Baptist university in Chicago to fill a void that existed in Baptist education.

== Rockefeller adviser ==
On January 21, 1889, Gates met the lifetime Baptist, John D. Rockefeller, Sr. He proved to be central to the suggestion and subsequent design of the funding plans for the creation by Rockefeller, Sr. of the Baptist University of Chicago; he subsequently served for many years as a trustee on its board.

=== Standard Oil ===
Gates then became Rockefeller's key philanthropic and business adviser, working in the newly established family office in Standard Oil headquarters at 26 Broadway, where he oversaw Rockefeller's investments in many companies but not in his personal stock in the Standard Oil Trust.

From 1892 onwards, faced with his ever expanding investments and real estate holdings, Rockefeller Sr. recognized the need for professional advice and so he formed a four-member committee, later including his son, John D. Rockefeller Jr., to manage his money, and nominated Gates as its head and as his senior business adviser. In this capacity Gates steered Rockefeller Sr. money predominantly to syndicates arranged by the investment house of Kuhn, Loeb & Co., and, to a lesser extent, the house of J. P. Morgan.

=== Other roles ===
Gates served on the boards of many companies in which Rockefeller had a majority shareholding; the latter then held a securities portfolio of unprecedented size for a private individual. Although Gates is recognized today as a philanthropic advisor, Rockefeller himself regarded him as the greatest businessman he had encountered in his life, skipping such prominent figures of the time as Henry Ford and Andrew Carnegie.

When he ceased being a business advisor to Rockefeller in 1912, Gates continued to advise him and his son, John D. Rockefeller Jr., on philanthropic matters, at the same time serving on many corporate boards. He also served as president of the General Education Board, which was subsequently merged into other Rockefeller family institutions.

=== Philanthropy ===
Gates focused exclusively on philanthropy after 1912. He moved Rockefeller from doling out retail sums to specific recipients to the wholesale process of setting up well-funded foundations that were run by experts who decided what topics of reform were ripe. In all Gates supervised the distribution of about $500 million. Although Rockefeller himself believed in folk medicine, the billionaire listened to his experts, and Gates convinced him that he could have the greatest impact by modernizing medicine especially by reforming education, sponsoring research to identify cures, and systematically eradicating debilitating diseases that sapped national efficiency like hookworm.

In 1901, Gates designed the Rockefeller Institute for Medical Research (now Rockefeller University), of which he was board president. He then designed the Rockefeller Foundation, becoming a trustee upon its creation in 1913. Gates served as president of the General Education Board, which became the leading foundation in the field of education.

By 1912, however, John D. Rockefeller Jr. was taking control of philanthropic policies, with Gates slipping to second place. Although Gates never quite lost his religion, he began shifting the direction from religious charities to decidedly more secular pursuits like medical research and education. Gates designed the China Medical Board (CMB) in 1914. Rather than viewing China through the traditional missionary lens of millions of heathens to be converted, Gates placed his faith in science. He complained the missionaries in China were trapped in the "bondage of tradition and an ignorance and misguided sentiment in the supporting churches." They had made few converts and fumbled the opportunity to spread Western science. There were hundreds of medical missionaries but they linked Western medical "miracles" to the teachings of Christianity. Instead of focusing on preventive health, they urged sick and dying patients to convert. Gates planned to take over the Peking Union Medical College and retrain missionaries there. Working at the intersection of philanthropy, imperialism, big business, religion, and science, the China Medical Board was his last major project.

In 1924, Gates overreached, asking the Rockefeller Foundation Board to invest $265 million in the China Medical Board. The fantastic sum would make Chinese medical care the finest in the world and would eliminate denominationalism influence from the practice of medicine and charity work in China. The Board refused and Gates became a victim of his own progressive emphasis on the "rule of experts." The experts on China and medicine disagreed with him, and he was marginalized, causing his resignation from the CMB.

Gates was a progressive and committed to the Efficiency Movement. He looked for leverage whereby a few millions of dollars would generate significant changes, as in the creation of a new university, the eradication of hookworm because it reduced efficiency or the revolution in hospitals caused by the Flexner Report.

== Personal life ==
On June 28, 1882, Gates was married to Lucia Fowler Perkins (d. 1883). She died a year later in 1883. On March 3, 1886, he married Emma Lucile Cahoon (1855–1934). Together, they were the parents of:

- Frederick Lamont Gates (1886–1933), a physician and scientist at The Rockefeller Institute for Medical Research.
- Franklin Herbert Gates (1888–1945), a banker and scientific farmer who married Janet McKee.
- Russell Cahoon Gates (1890–1964), who married Lois Ada Lottridge (1901–1988), in 1920.
- Alice Florence Gates (1891–1974), who married Dr. William Kent Pudney in 1929.
- Lucia Louise Gates (1893–1967), who married Leverett Franklin Hooper in 1921.
- Grace Lucile Gates (1895–1981), who married Morris Randolph Mitchell (1895–1976), the first president of Friends World College, in 1919.
- Percival Taylor Gates (1897–1978), who married Frances Elaine Crozier (1901–1978).

The Gates family lived at 66 South Mountain Avenue in Montclair, New Jersey.

Gates died on February 6, 1929, of pneumonia and acute appendicitis in Phoenix, Arizona, where he and his wife were visiting a daughter. After a funeral and memorial at the First Congregational Church in Montclair, Gates was buried at Mount Hebron Cemetery in Upper Montclair.

=== Descendants ===
Through his eldest son Frederick, he was the grandfather of Frederick Taylor Gates, a Phillips Exeter Academy and Yale alumnus, who married Patricia Brown, the daughter of William Stuart Forbes Jr. Contrary to persistent internet rumors, Frederick Taylor Gates is not related to Bill Gates, Microsoft co-founder.

== See also ==
- Rockefeller family
- Rockefeller Foundation
- John D. Rockefeller
- John D. Rockefeller Jr.
