= Rockefeller Foundation =

American philanthropic organization

- Formation: May 14, 1913; 113 years ago
- Founders: John D. Rockefeller; John D. Rockefeller Jr. Frederick Taylor Gates
- Type: Non-operating private foundation (IRS exemption status): 501(c)(3)
- Tax ID no.: 13-1659629
- Headquarters: 420 Fifth Avenue, New York City, New York, U.S.
- Coordinates: 40°45′3″N 73°59′0″W
- Method: Endowment
- President: Rajiv Shah
- Revenue: $1.1 billion (2025)
- Expenses: $568 million (2025)
- Endowment: $6.3 billion (2022)
- Website: rockefellerfoundation.org

The Rockefeller Foundation is an American private foundation and philanthropic medical research and arts funding organization based at 420 Fifth Avenue, New York City. The foundation was created by Standard Oil magnate John D. Rockefeller ("Senior") and son "Junior", and their primary business advisor, Frederick Taylor Gates, on May 14, 1913, when its charter was granted by New York. It is the second-oldest major philanthropic institution in America (after the Carnegie Corporation) and ranks as the 35th largest foundation globally by endowment, with assets of over $6.4 billion in 2023.

The Rockefeller Foundation is legally independent from other Rockefeller entities, including the Rockefeller University and Rockefeller Center. The foundation operates under the oversight of its own independent board of trustees, with its own resources and distinct mission. Since its inception, the foundation has donated billions of dollars to various causes, becoming the largest philanthropic enterprise in the world by the 1920s. The foundation has maintained an international reach since the 1930s and major influence on global non-governmental organizations. The World Health Organization is modeled on the International Health Division of the foundation, which sent doctors abroad to study and treat human subjects. The National Science Foundation and National Institute of Health are also modeled on the work funded by Rockefeller. It has also been a supporter of and influence on the United Nations.

In 2020, the foundation pledged that it would divest from fossil fuel, notable since the endowment was largely funded by Standard Oil. The foundation also has a controversial past, including support of eugenics in the 1930s, as well as several scandals arising from their international field work. In 2021, the foundation's president committed to reckoning with their history, and to centering equity and inclusion.

== History ==
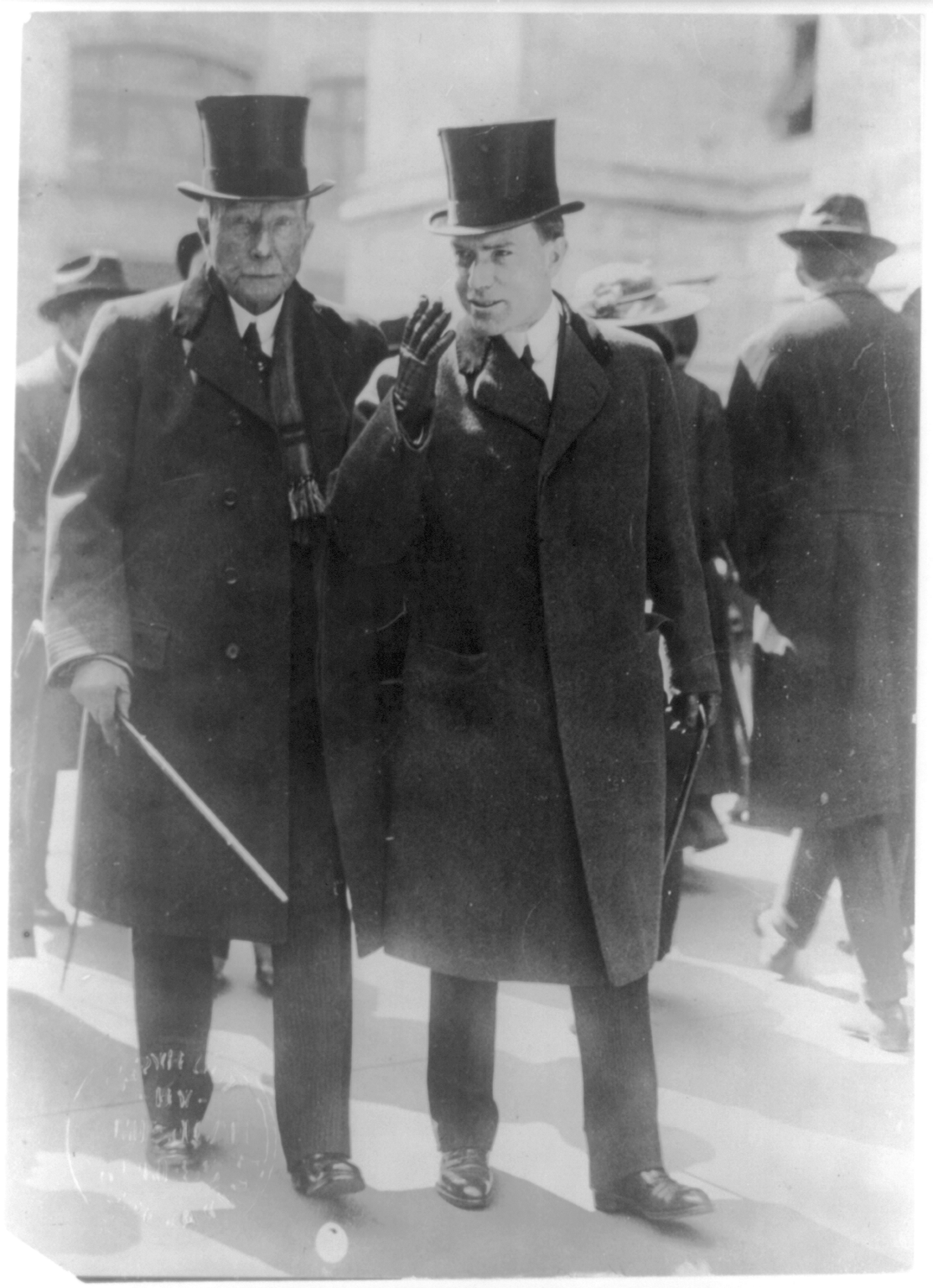
John D. Rockefeller Sr. and Jr. in 1915

John D. Rockefeller Sr. first conceived the idea of the foundation in 1901. In 1906, Rockefeller's business and philanthropic advisor, Frederick Taylor Gates, encouraged him toward "permanent corporate philanthropies for the good of Mankind" so that his heirs should not "dissipate their inheritances or become intoxicated with power." In 1909 Rockefeller signed over 73,000 Standard Oil shares worth $50 million, to his son, Gates and Harold Fowler McCormick as the third inaugural trustee, in the first installment of a projected $100 million endowment.

The nascent foundation applied for a federal charter in the US Senate in 1910, with at one stage Junior even secretly meeting with President William Howard Taft, through the aegis of Senator Nelson Aldrich, to hammer out concessions. However, because of the ongoing (1911) antitrust suit against Standard Oil at the time, along with deep suspicion in some quarters of undue Rockefeller influence on the spending of the endowment, the result was that Senior and Gates withdrew the bill from Congress in order to seek a state charter from New York.

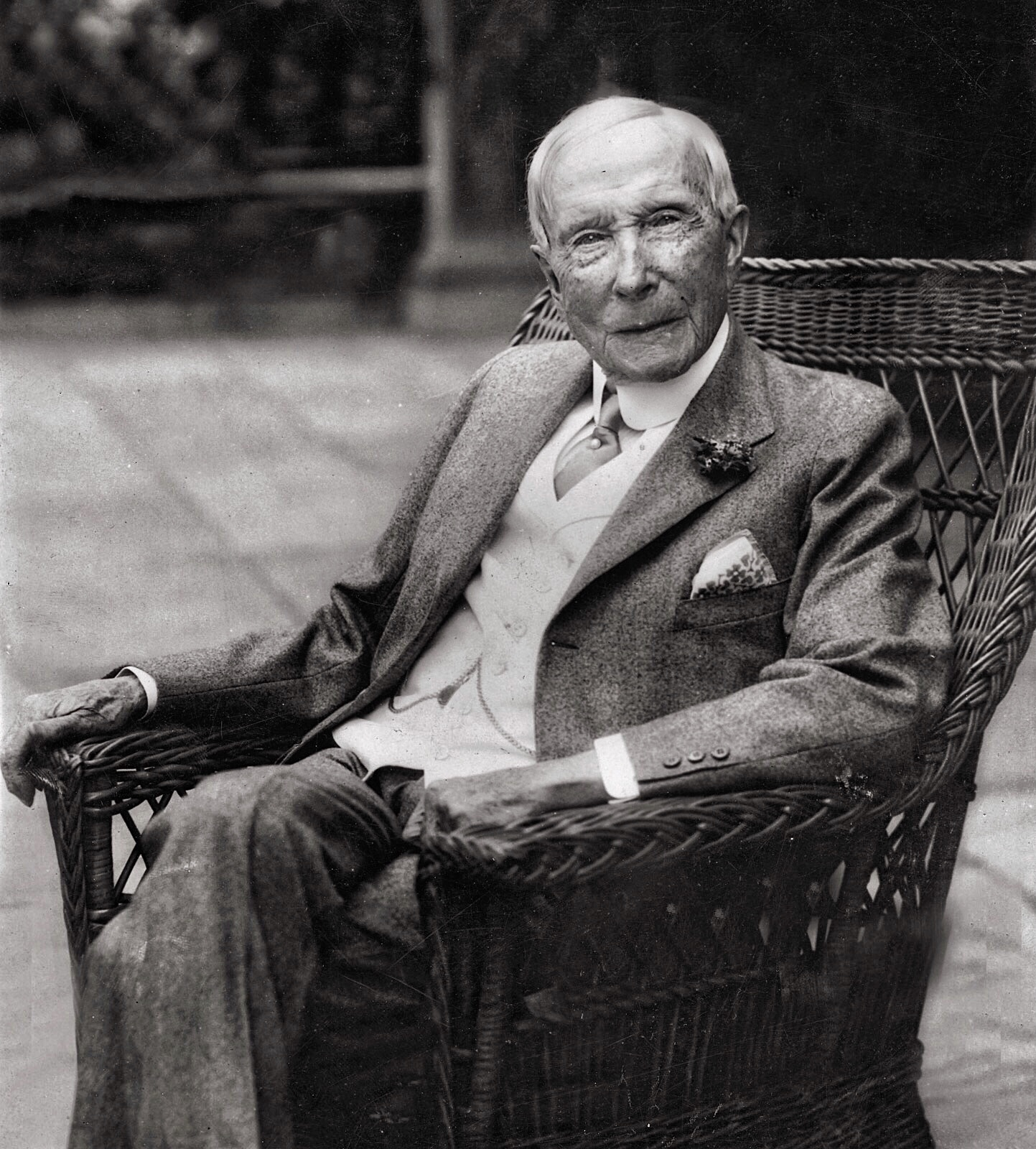
John D. Rockefeller Sr. in 1919

On May 14, 1913, New York Governor William Sulzer approved a charter for the foundation with Junior becoming the first president. With its large-scale endowment, a large part of Senior's fortune was insulated from inheritance taxes. The first secretary of the foundation was Jerome Davis Greene, the former secretary of Harvard University, who wrote a "memorandum on principles and policies" for an early meeting of the trustees that established a rough framework for the foundation's work. It was initially located within the family office at Standard Oil's headquarters at 26 Broadway, later (in 1933) shifting to the GE Building (then RCA), along with the newly named family office, Room 5600, at Rockefeller Center; later it moved to the Time-Life Building in the center, before shifting to its current Fifth Avenue address.

In 1914, the trustees set up a new Department of Industrial Relations, inviting William Lyon Mackenzie King to head it. He became a close and key advisor to Junior through the Ludlow Massacre, turning around his attitude to unions; however the foundation's involvement in IR was criticized for advancing the family's business interests. The foundation henceforth confined itself to funding responsible organizations involved in this and other controversial fields, which were beyond the control of the foundation itself.

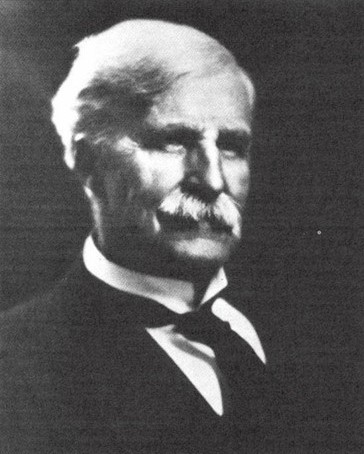
Frederick T. Gates, 1922

Junior became the foundation chairman in 1917. Through the Laura Spelman Rockefeller Memorial (LSRM), established by Senior in 1918 and named after his wife, the Rockefeller fortune was for the first time directed to supporting research by social scientists. During its first few years of work, the LSRM awarded funds primarily to social workers, with its funding decisions guided primarily by Junior. In 1922, Beardsley Ruml was hired to direct the LSRM, and he most decisively shifted the focus of Rockefeller philanthropy into the social sciences, stimulating the founding of university research centers, and creating the Social Science Research Council. In January 1929, LSRM funds were folded into the Rockefeller Foundation, in a major reorganization.

The Rockefeller family helped lead the foundation in its early years, but later limited itself to one or two representatives, to maintain the foundation's independence and avoid charges of undue family influence. These representatives have included the former president John D. Rockefeller III, and then his son John D. Rockefeller, IV, who gave up the trusteeship in 1981. In 1989, David Rockefeller's daughter, Peggy Dulany, was appointed to the board for a five-year term. In October 2006, David Rockefeller Jr. joined the board of trustees, re-establishing the direct family link and becoming the sixth family member to serve on the board.

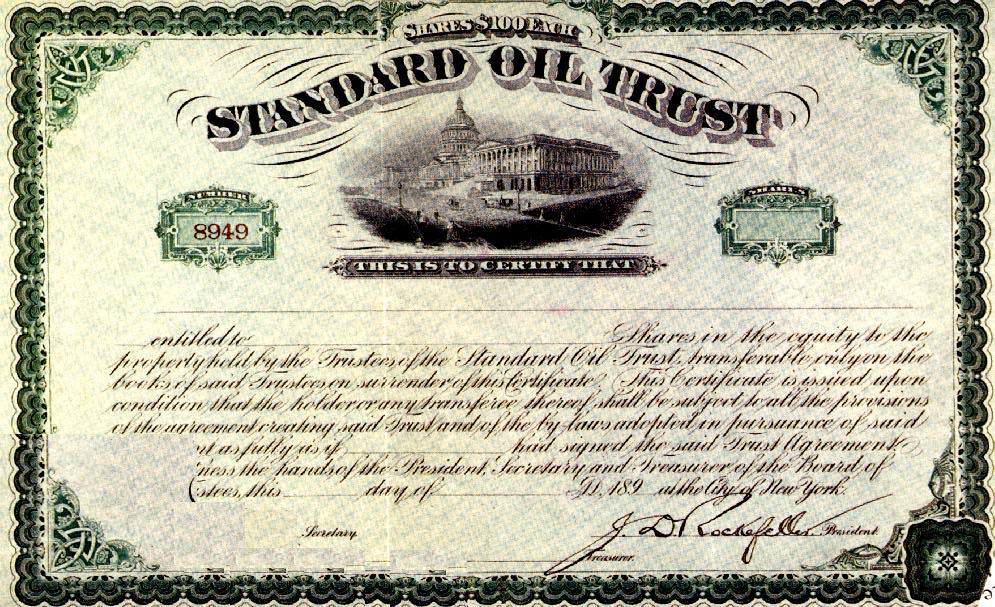
Standard Oil Trust stock certificate, 1896

C. Douglas Dillon, the United States Secretary of the Treasury under both Presidents John F. Kennedy and Lyndon B. Johnson, served as chairman of the foundation.

Stock in the family's oil companies had been a major part of the foundation's assets, beginning with Standard Oil and later with its corporate descendants, including ExxonMobil. In December 2020, the foundation pledged to dump their fossil fuel holdings. With a $5 billion endowment, the Rockefeller Foundation was "the largest US foundation to embrace the rapidly growing divestment movement." CNN writer Matt Egan noted, "This divestment is especially symbolic because the Rockefeller Foundation was founded by oil money."

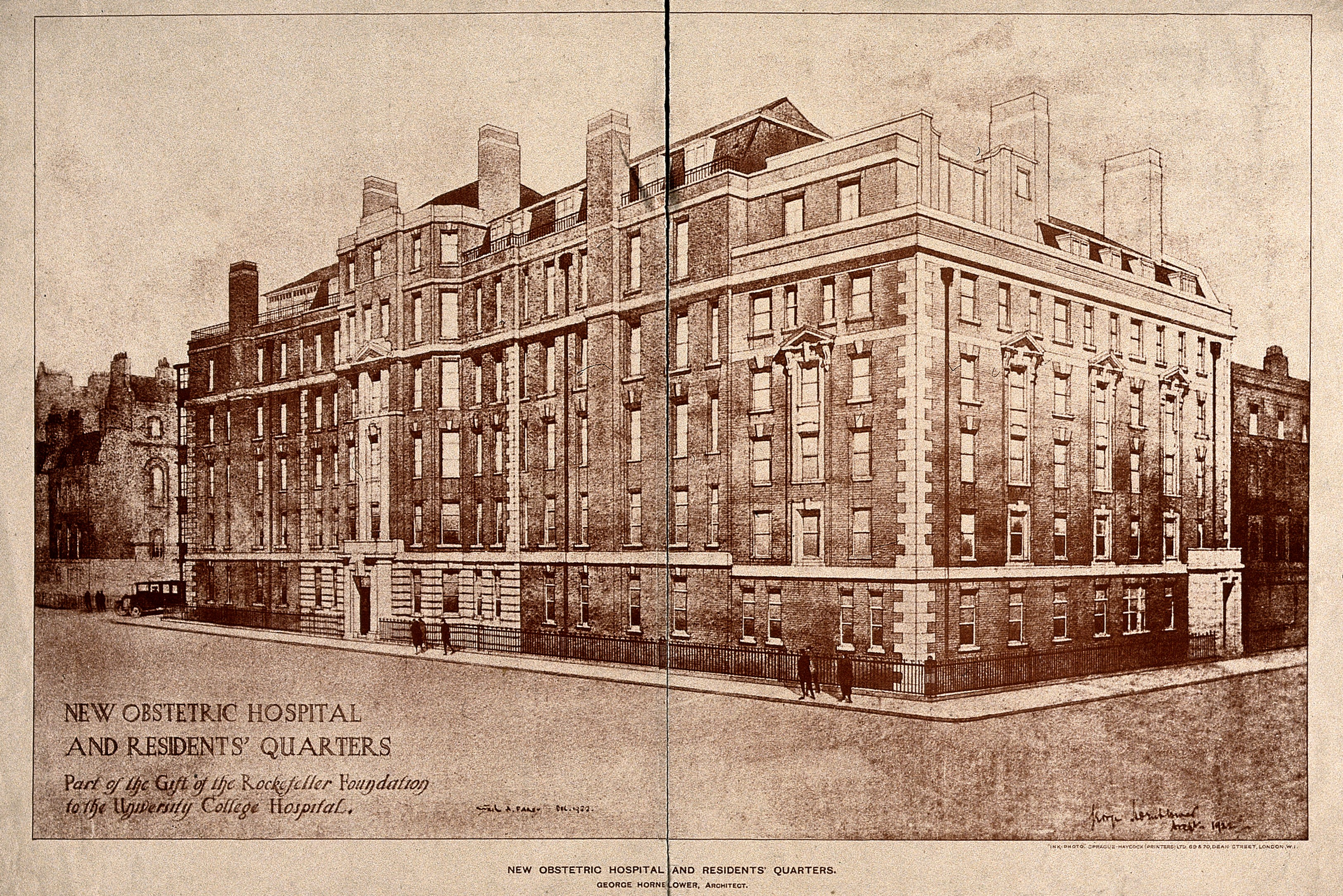
University College Hospital, London

== Public health ==
Public health, health aid, and medical research are the most prominent areas of work of the foundation. On December 5, 1913, the Board made its first grant of $100,000 to the American Red Cross to purchase property for its headquarters in Washington, D.C.

The foundation established the Johns Hopkins School of Public Health and Harvard School of Public Health, two of the first such institutions in the United States, and established the School of Hygiene at the University of Toronto in 1927, and the London School of Hygiene and Tropical Medicine in the United Kingdom. they spent more than $25 million in developing other public health schools in the US and in 21 foreign countries. In 1913, it also began a 20-year support program of the Bureau of Social Hygiene, whose mission was research and education on birth control, maternal health and sex education. In 1914, the foundation set up the China Medical Board, which established the first public health university in China, the Peking Union Medical College, in 1921; this was subsequently nationalized when the Communists took over the country in 1949. In the same year it began a program of international fellowships to train scholars at many of the world's universities at the post-doctoral level. The Foundation also maintained a close relationship with Rockefeller University (also known as the Rockefeller Institute for Medical Research) with many faculty holding overlapping positions between the institutions.

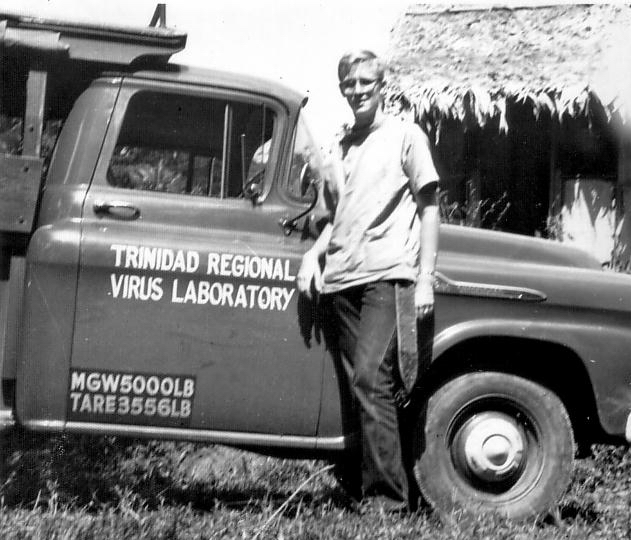
Trinidad Regional Virus Laboratory Field Assistant, Nariva Swamp, Trinidad, 1959

The Sanitary Commission for the Eradication of Hookworm Disease was a Rockefeller-funded campaign from 1909 to 1914 to study and treat hookworm disease in 11 Southern states. Hookworm was known as the "germ of laziness". In 1913, the foundation expanded its work with the Sanitary Commission abroad and set up the International Health Division (also known as International Health Board), which began the foundation's first international public health activities. The International Health Division conducted campaigns in public health and sanitation against malaria, yellow fever, and hookworm in areas throughout Europe, Latin America and the Caribbean including Italy, France, Venezuela, Mexico, and Puerto Rico, totaling fifty-two countries on six continents and twenty-nine islands. The first director was Wickliffe Rose, followed by F.F. Russell in 1923, Wilbur Sawyer in 1935, and George Strode in 1944. A number of notable physicians and field scientists worked on the international campaigns, including Lewis Hackett, Hideyo Noguchi, Juan Guiteras, George C. Payne, Livingston Farrand, Cornelius P. Rhoads, and William Bosworth Castle. In 1936, The Rockefeller Foundation received one of the first awarded Walter Reed Medals from The American Society of Tropical Medicine & Hygiene to recognize its study and control of Yellow Fever. The World Health Organization, seen as a successor to the IHD, was formed in 1948, and the IHD was subsumed by the larger Rockefeller Foundation in 1951, discontinuing its overseas work.

While the Rockefeller doctors working in tropical locales such as Mexico emphasized scientific neutrality, they had political and economic aims to promote the value of public health to improve American relations with the host country. Although they claimed the banner of public health and humanitarian medicine, they often engaged with politics and business interests. Rhoads was involved in a racism whitewashing scandal in the 1930s during which he joked about injecting cancer cells into Puerto Rican patients, inspiring Puerto Rican nationalist and anti-colonialist leader Pedro Albizu Campos. Noguchi was also involved in an unethical human experimentation scandal. Susan Lederer, Elizabeth Fee, and Jay Katz are among the modern scholars who have researched this period. Researchers with the foundation including Noguchi developed the vaccine to prevent yellow fever. Rhoads later became a significant cancer researcher and director of Memorial Sloan-Kettering, though his eponymous award for oncological excellence was renamed after the scandal reemerged.

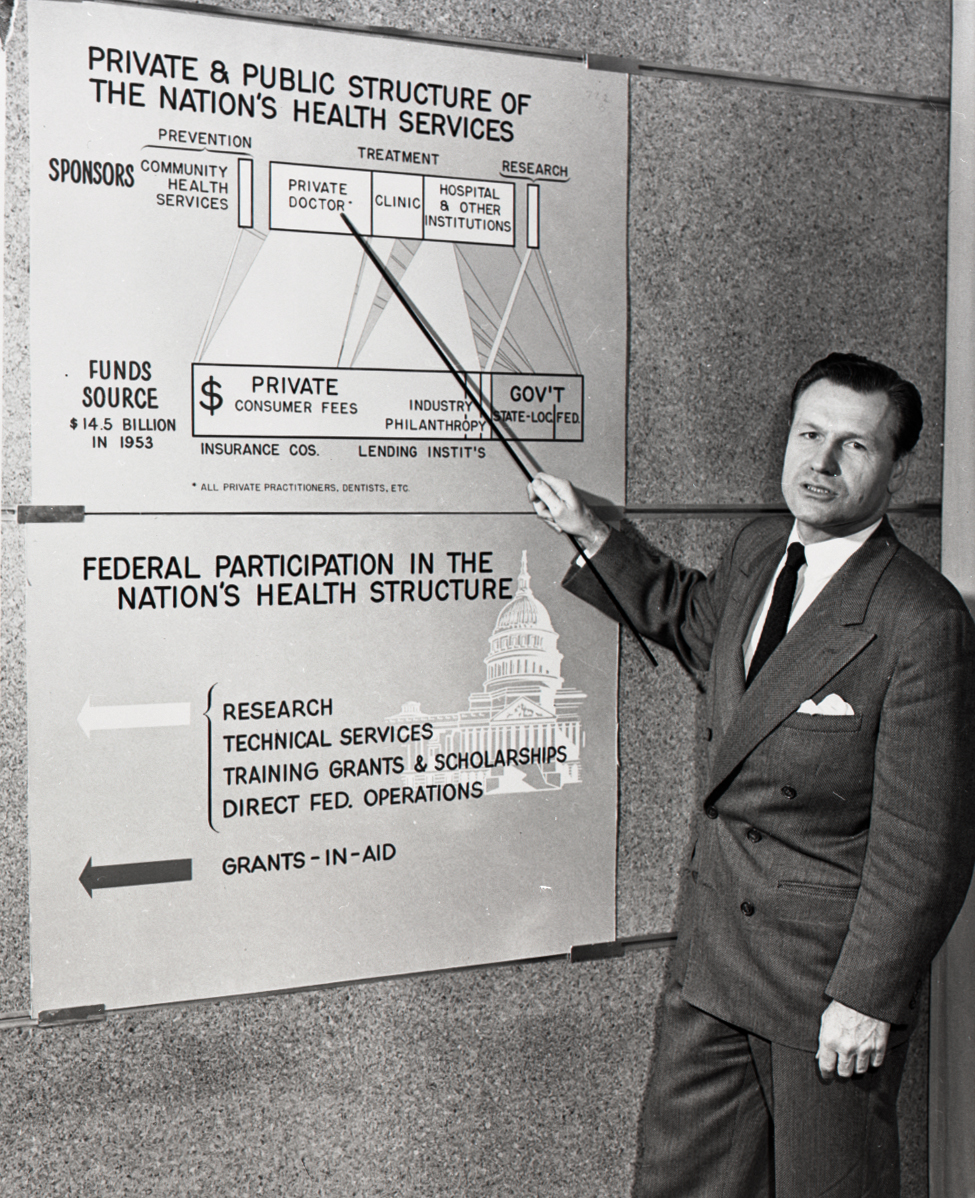
Nelson Rockefeller, 1954

During the late-1920s, the Rockefeller Foundation created the Medical Sciences Division, which emerged from the former Division of Medical Education. The division was led by Richard M. Pearce until his death in 1930, to which Alan Gregg succeeded him until 1945. During this period, the Division of Medical Sciences made contributions to research across several fields of psychiatry. In 1935 the foundation granted $100000 to the Institute for Psychoanalysis in Chicago. This grant was renewed in 1938, with payments extending into the early-1940s. This division funded women's contraception and the human reproductive system in general, but also was involved in funding controversial eugenics research. Other funding went into endocrinology departments in American universities, human heredity, mammalian biology, human physiology and anatomy, psychology, and the studies of human sexual behavior by Alfred Kinsey.

In the interwar years, the foundation funded public health, nursing, and social work in Eastern and Central Europe.

In 1950, the foundation expanded their international program of virus research, establishing field laboratories in Poona, India, Trinidad, Belém, Brazil, Johannesburg, South Africa, Cairo, Egypt, Ibadan, Nigeria, and Cali, Colombia, among others. The foundation funded research into the identification of human viruses, techniques for virus identification, and arthropod-borne viruses.

Bristol-Myers Squibb, Johns Hopkins University and the Rockefeller Foundation are currently the subject of a $1 billion lawsuit from Guatemala for "roles in a 1940s U.S. government experiment that infected hundreds of Guatemalans with syphilis". A previous suit against the United States government was dismissed in 2011 for the Guatemala syphilis experiments when a judge determined that the U.S. government could not be held liable for actions committed outside of the U.S.

An experiment was conducted by Vanderbilt University in the 1940s where they gave 800 pregnant women radioactive iron, 751 of which were pills, without their consent. In a 1969 article published in the American Journal of Epidemiology, it was estimated that three children had died from the experiment.

== Educational research ==
Industrialist John D. Rockefeller was instrumental in establishing the General Education Board (GEB), of which he maintained expenditure control. The GEB adopted his beliefs, promoting vocational education across a 5-decade span.

The Rockefeller Foundation, like the Carnegie Corporation, supported early educational broadcasting and the participation of commercial radio, vis-à-vis education-only stations. It explored radio's educational effectivity in both classroom and adult settings and explored methods to share those results. Via GEB dispersals the Rockefeller Foundation provided financial support for Wisconsin's and Ohio's early School of the Air experiments, among other educational project recipients.

The Foundation's interest in broadcasting as a tool subsequently led to communication research, e.g. how radio "could be used for public edification, control, and pacification", promoting university-level social science studies. The social engineering success of these early social scientists led to social sciences becoming institutionalized with Rockefeller Foundation's influence leading the transformation.

== Eugenics and World War II ==
John D. Rockefeller Jr. was an outspoken supporter of eugenics. Even as late as 1951, John D. Rockefeller III and John Foster Dulles, who was chairman of the foundation at the time, established the Population Council to advance family planning, birth control, and population control, and goals of the eugenics movement.

The Rockefeller Foundation, along with the Carnegie Institution, was the primary financier for the Eugenics Record Office, until 1939. The foundation also provided grants to Margaret Sanger and Alexis Carrel, who supported birth control, compulsory sterilization and eugenics. Sanger went to Japan in 1922 and influenced the birth control movement there.

By 1926, Rockefeller had donated over $400,000, which would be almost $4 million adjusted for inflation in 2003, to hundreds of German researchers, including Ernst Rüdin and Otmar Freiherr von Verschuer, through funding the Kaiser Wilhelm Institute of Anthropology, Human Heredity, and Eugenics, (also known as the Max Planck Institute for Medical Research) which conducted eugenics experiments in Nazi Germany and influenced the development of Nazi racial scientific ideology. Rockefeller spent almost $3 million between 1925 and 1935, and also funded other German eugenicists, Herman Poll, Alfred Grotjahn, Eugen Fischer, and Hans Nachsteim, continuing even after Hitler's ascent to power in 1933; Rüdin's work influenced compulsory sterilisation in Nazi Germany. Josef Mengele worked as an assistant in Verschuer's lab, though Rockefeller executives did not know of Mengele and stopped funding that specific research before World War II started in 1939.

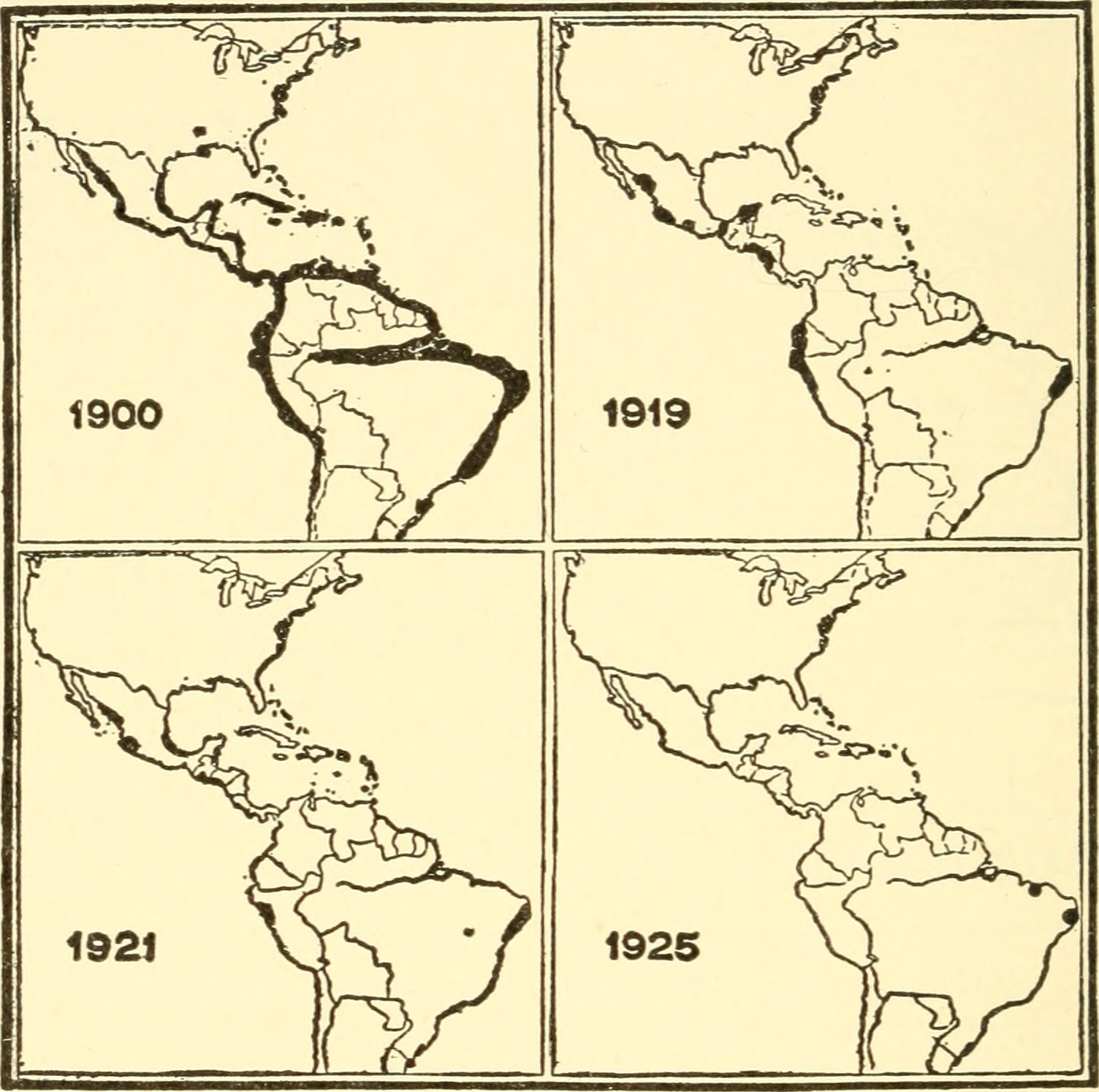
Map of yellow fever and syphilis control, 1900–1925

The Rockefeller Foundation continued funding German eugenics research even after it was clear that it was being used to rationalize discrimination against Jewish people and other groups, after the Nuremberg laws in 1935. In 1936, Rockefeller fulfilled pledges of $655,000 to Kaiser Wilhelm Institute, even though several distinguished Jewish scientists had been dropped from the institute at the time. The Rockefeller Foundation did not alert the world about the racist implications of Nazi ideology, but furthered and funded eugenic research through the 1930s. Even into the 1950s, Rockefeller continued to provide some funding for research borne out of German eugenics.

The foundation also funded the relocation of scholars threatened by the Nazis to America in the 1930s, known as the Refugee Scholar Program and the Emergency Committee in Aid of Displaced Foreign Scholars. Some of the notable figures relocated or saved, among a total of 303 scholars, were Thomas Mann, Claude Lévi-Strauss and Leó Szilárd. The foundation helped The New School provide a haven for scholars threatened by the Nazis.

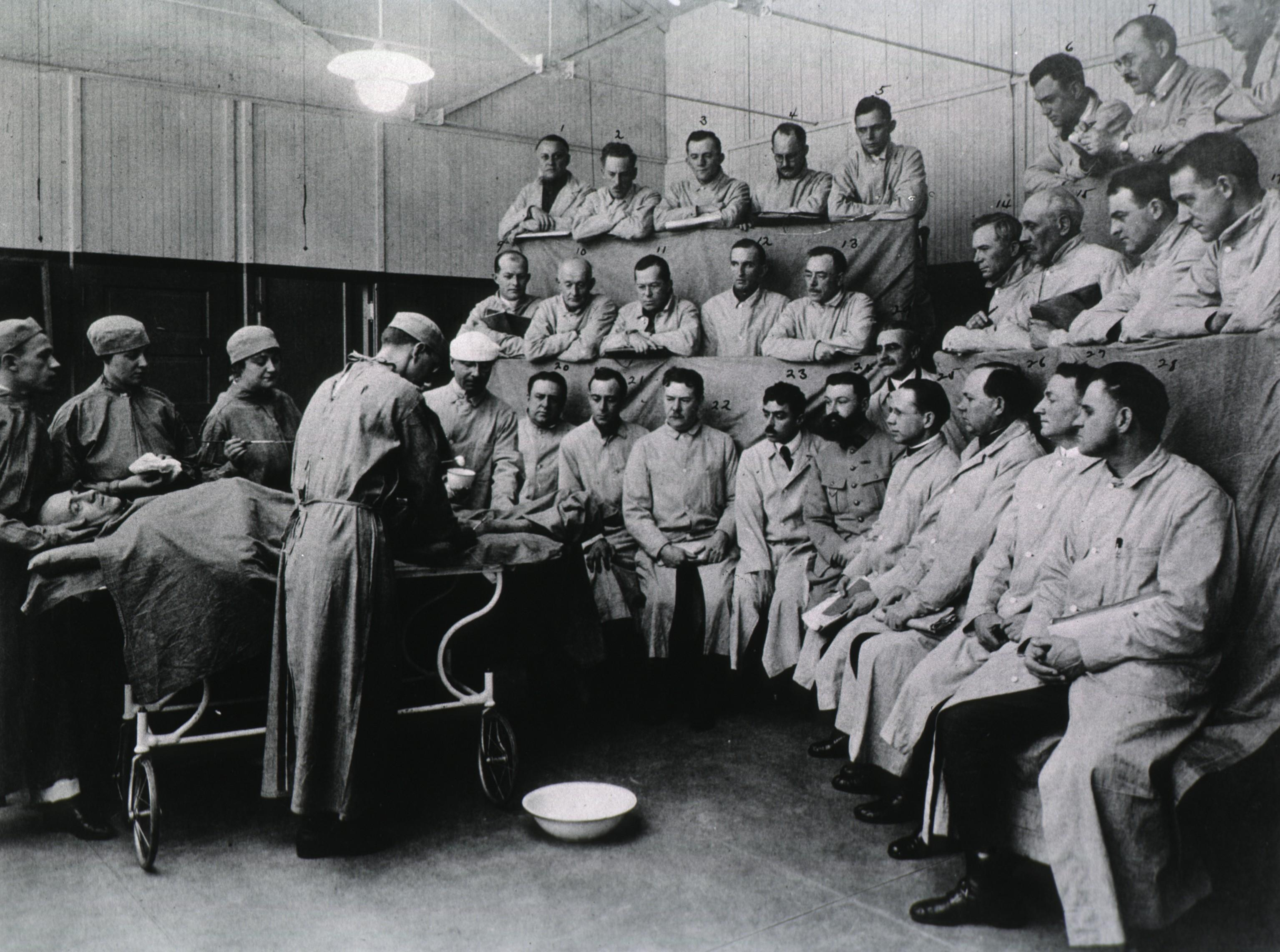
Demonstration lecture, Alexis Carrel performs surgery, Rockefeller Institute for Medical Research, 1918

After World War II the foundation sent a team to West Germany to investigate how it could become involved in reconstructing the country. They focused on restoring democracy, especially regarding education and scientific research, with the long-term goal of reintegrating Germany into the Western world.

The foundation also supported the early initiatives of Henry Kissinger, such as his directorship of Harvard's International Seminars (funded as well by the Central Intelligence Agency) and the early foreign policy magazine Confluence, both established by him while he was still a graduate student.

In 2021, Rajiv J. Shah, president of the Rockefeller Foundation, released a statement condemning eugenics and supporting the anti-eugenics movement. He stated that

"[...] we commend the Anti-Eugenics Project for their essential work to understand[...] the harmful legacies of eugenicist ideologies. [...] examine the role that philanthropies played in developing and perpetuating eugenics policies and practices. The Rockefeller Foundation is currently reckoning with our own history in relation to eugenics. This requires uncovering the facts and confronting uncomfortable truths, [...] The Rockefeller Foundation is putting equity and inclusion at the center of all our work: [...] confronting the hateful legacies of the past [...] we understand that the work we engage in today does not absolve us of yesterday's mistakes. [...]"

== Development of the United Nations ==
Although the United States never joined the League of Nations, the Rockefeller Foundation was involved, and by the 1930s the foundations had changed the League from a "Parliament of Nations" to a modern think tank that used specialized expertise to provide in-depth impartial analysis of international issues. After the war, the foundation was involved in the establishment of the United Nations.

== Arts and philanthropy ==
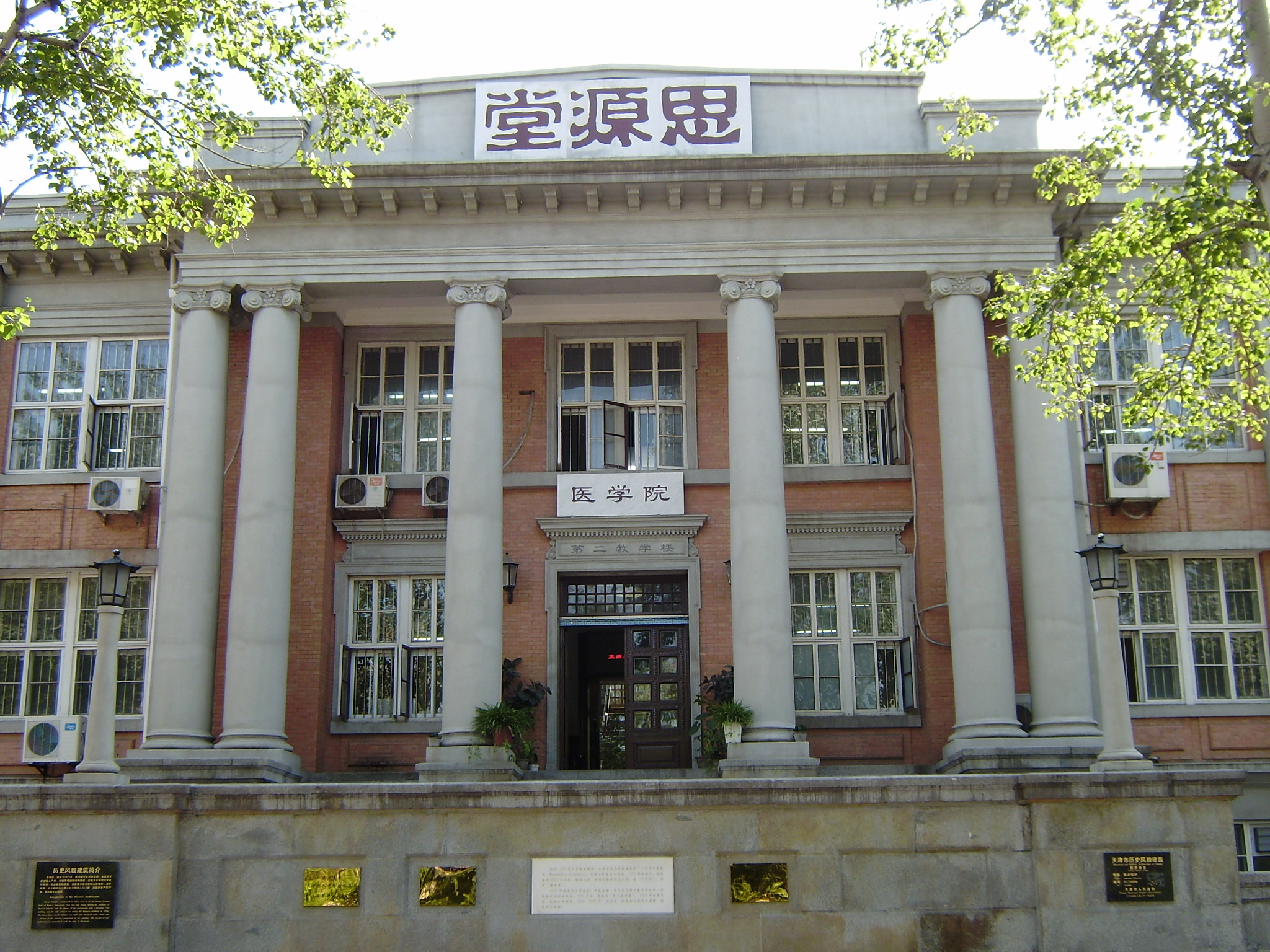
Siyuan Hall, 1923 Rockefeller Foundation donated to Nankai University in Tianjin. Now it is Nankai University School of Medicine.

Senate House (University of London) was built on donation of £400,000 from Rockefeller Foundation in 1926 and a foundation stone laid by King George V in 1933. It is the headquarters of the University of London since 1937.

In the arts, the Rockefeller Foundation has supported the Stratford Shakespeare Festival in Ontario, Canada, and the American Shakespeare Festival in Stratford, Connecticut, Arena Stage in Washington, D.C., Karamu House in Cleveland, and Lincoln Center in New York. The foundation underwrote Spike Lee's documentary on New Orleans, When the Levees Broke. The film has been used as the basis for a curriculum on poverty, developed by the Teachers College at Columbia University for their students.

The Cultural Innovation Fund is a pilot grant program that is overseen by the Lincoln Center. The grants are to be used towards art and cultural opportunities in the underserved areas of Brooklyn and the South Bronx with three overarching goals.

The Rockefeller Foundation supported the art scene in Haiti in 1948 and a literacy project with UNESCO.

Rusk was involved with funding the humanities and the social sciences during the Cold War period, including study of the Soviet Union.

In July 2022, the Rockefeller Foundation granted $1m to the Wikimedia Foundation.

=== Bellagio Center ===
The foundation also owns and operates the Bellagio Center in Bellagio, Italy. The center has several buildings, spread across a 50-acre (200,000 m^{2}) property, on the peninsula between lakes Como and Lecco in Northern Italy. The center is sometimes referred to as the "Villa Serbelloni", the property bequeathed to the foundation in 1959 under the presidency of Dean Rusk (who was later to become U.S. President Kennedy's secretary of state).

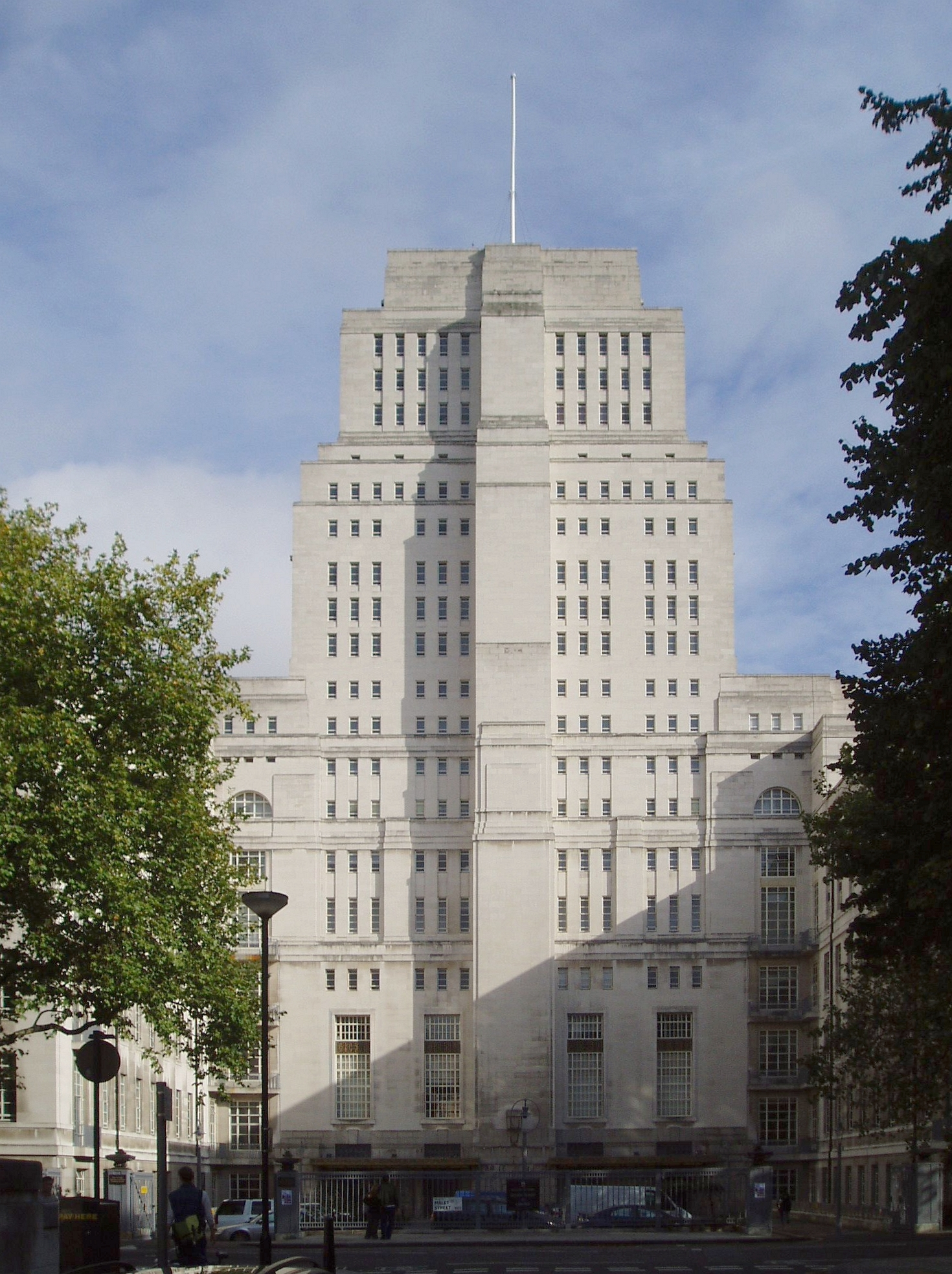
Senate House (University of London)

The Bellagio Center operates both a conference center and a residency program. Numerous Nobel laureates, Pulitzer winners, National Book Award recipients, Prince Mahidol Award winners, and MacArthur fellows, as well as several acting and former heads of state and government, have been in residence at Bellagio.

== Agriculture ==
Agriculture was introduced to the Natural Sciences division of the foundation in the major reorganization of 1928. In 1941, the foundation gave a small grant to Mexico for maize research, in collaboration with the then new president, Manuel Ávila Camacho. This was done after the intervention of Vice President Henry Wallace and the involvement of Nelson Rockefeller; the primary intention being to stabilise the Mexican Government and derail any possible communist infiltration, in order to protect the Rockefeller family's investments.

By 1943, this program, under the foundation's Mexican Agriculture Project, had proved such a success with the science of corn propagation and general principles of agronomy that it was exported to other Latin American countries; in 1956, the program was then taken to India; again with the geopolitical imperative of providing an antidote to communism. It wasn't until 1959 that senior foundation officials succeeded in getting the Ford Foundation (and later USAID, and later still, the World Bank) to sign on to the major philanthropic project, known now to the world as the Green Revolution. It was originally conceived in 1943 as CIMMYT, the International Maize and Wheat Improvement Center in Mexico. It also provided significant funding for the International Rice Research Institute in the Philippines. Part of the original program, the funding of the IRRI was later taken over by the Ford Foundation. The International Rice Research Institute and the International Maize and Wheat Improvement Center are part of a consortium of agricultural research organizations known as CGIAR.

Costing around $600 million, over 50 years, the revolution brought new farming technology, increased productivity, expanded crop yields and mass fertilization to many countries throughout the world. Later it funded over $100 million of plant biotechnology research and trained over four hundred scientists from Asia, Africa and Latin America. It also invested in the production of transgenic crops, including rice and maize. In 1999, the then president Gordon Conway addressed the Monsanto Company board of directors, warning of the possible social and environmental dangers of this biotechnology, and requesting them to disavow the use of so-called terminator genes; the company later complied.

In the 1990s, the foundation shifted its agriculture work and emphasis to Africa; in 2006, it joined with the Bill & Melinda Gates Foundation in a $150 million effort to fight hunger in the continent through improved agricultural productivity. In an interview marking the 100 year anniversary of the Rockefeller Foundation, Judith Rodin explained to This Is Africa that Rockefeller has been involved in Africa since their beginning in three main areas – health, agriculture and education, though agriculture has been and continues to be their largest investment in Africa.

== Urban development ==
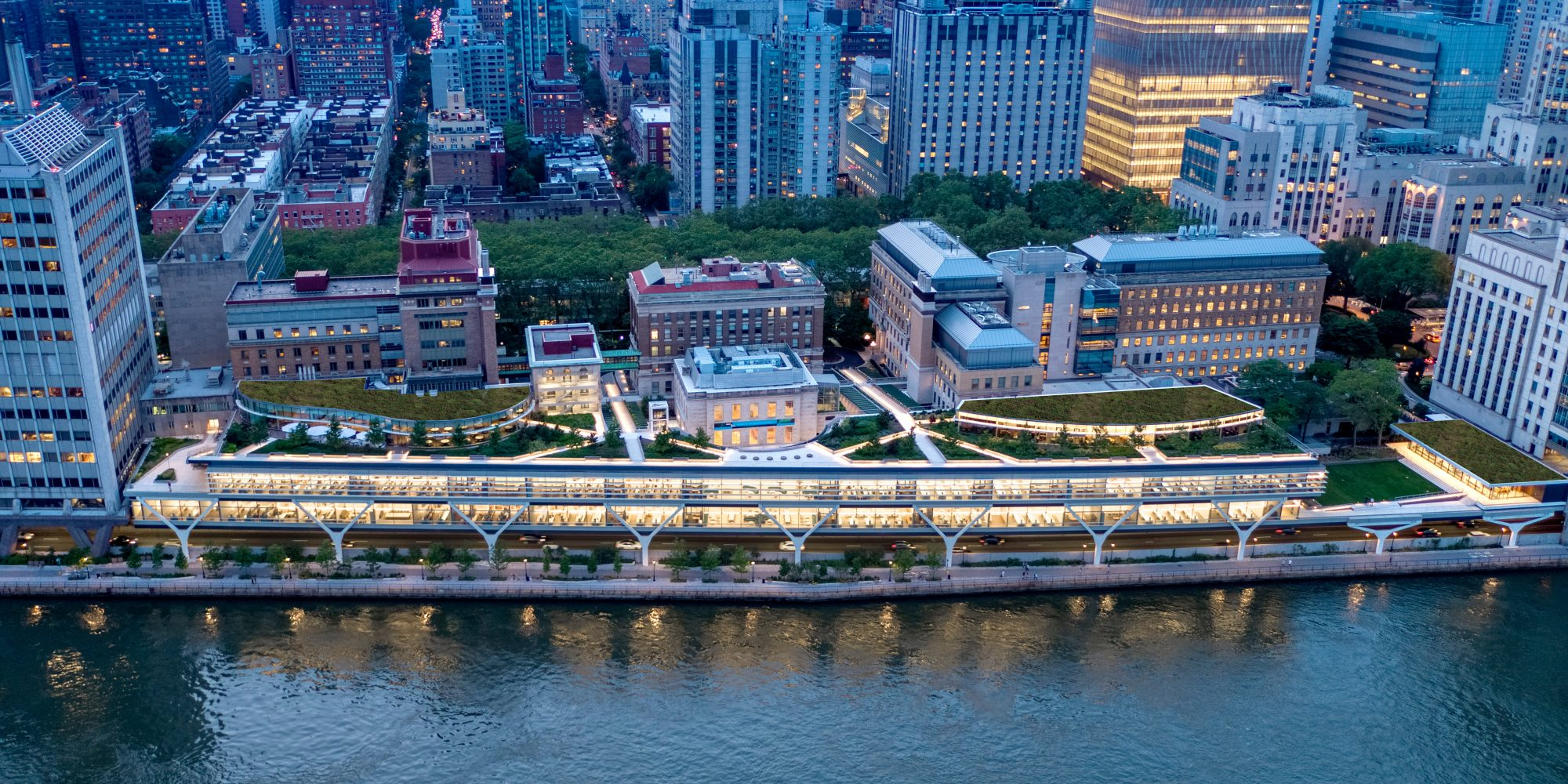
Rockefeller University campus on the FDR Drive, New York, NY, 2021

A total of 100 cities across six continents were part of the 100 Resilient Cities program funded by the Rockefeller Foundation. In January 2016, the United States Department of Housing and Urban Development announced winners of its National Disaster Resilience Competition (NDRC), awarding three 100RC member cities – New York City; Norfolk, VA; and New Orleans, LA – with more than $437 million in disaster resilience funding. The grant was the largest ever received by the city of Norfolk.

In April 2019, it was announced that the foundation would no longer be funding the 100 Resilient Cities program as a whole. Some elements of the initiative's work, most prominently the funding of several cities' Chief Resilience Officer roles, continues to be managed and funded by the Rockefeller Foundation, while other aspects of the program continue in the form of two independent organizations, Resilient Cities Catalyst (RCC) and the Global Resilient Cities Network (GRCN), founded by former 100RC leadership and staff.

== Notable people ==
=== Board members and trustees ===
On January 5, 2017, the board of trustees announced the selection of Rajiv Shah to serve as the 13th president of the foundation. Shah became the youngest person, at 43, and first Indian-American to serve as president of the foundation. He assumed the position March 1, succeeding Judith Rodin who served as president for nearly twelve years and announced her retirement, at age 71, in June 2016. A former president of the University of Pennsylvania, Rodin was the first woman to head the foundation. Rodin in turn had succeeded Gordon Conway in 2005. Current staff as of June 1, 2021 include:

- Reena Ninan is a former member of the Atlantic Council, Rockefeller Foundation & Council on Foreign Relations. She currently works as a presider of their public forums.
- Admiral James G. Stavridis (chair), 2018–, retired United States Navy; Supreme Allied Commander at NATO, 2009–2013, Operating Executive, The Carlyle Group; chair of the Board of Counselors, McLarty Associates
- Agnes Binagwaho, 2019–, Vice-Chancellor, The University of Global Health Equity, Rwanda
- Mellody Hobson, 2018–, President, Ariel Investments
- Donald Kaberuka, 2015–, former president, African Development Bank Group, Rwanda Minister of Finance and Economic Planning between 1997 and 2005.
- Martin L. Leibowitz, 2012–, Vice-chairman, Morgan Stanley Research Department's Global Strategy Team; formerly TIAA-CREF (1995 to 2004) and 26 years with Salomon Brothers
- Yifei Li, 2013–, country chair, Man Group China
- Ndidi Okonkwo Nwuneli, 2019–, co-founder, Sahel Consulting
- Paul Polman, 2019–, chair, International Chamber of Commerce, The B Team; Former CEO, Unilever
- Sharon Percy Rockefeller, 2017–, President & CEO, WETA-TV
- Juan Manuel Santos, 2020–, Former President of Colombia & Recipient of 2016 Nobel Peace Prize
- Rajiv Shah, 2017–, President of the foundation and ex-officio member of the board; served as a Rockefeller Foundation Trustee, 2015–2017; former administrator of the United States Agency for International Development (USAID) from 2010 to 2017.
- Adam Silver, 2020–, Commissioner, National Basketball Association (NB)
- Patty Stonesifer, 2019–, former President & CEO, Martha's Table; former CEO and co-chair, Bill and Melinda Gates Foundation
- Ravi Venkatesan, 2014–, former chairman, Bank of Baroda; former Chairman Microsoft India (2004–2011) and Cummins India; Special Representative for Young People and Innovation, UNICEF

=== Past trustees ===
- Alan Alda, 1989–1994 – actor and film director.
- Winthrop W. Aldrich 1935–1951 – chairman of the Chase National Bank, 1934–1953; Ambassador to the Court of St. James's, 1953–1957.
- John W. Davis 1922–1939 – J. P. Morgan's private attorney; founding president of the Council on Foreign Relations.
- C. Douglas Dillon 1960–1961 – US Treasury Secretary, 1961–1965; member of the Council on Foreign Relations.
- Orvil E. Dryfoos 1960–1963 – publisher of The New York Times, 1961–1963.
- Peggy Dulany, 1989–1994 – Fourth child of David Rockefeller; founder and president of Synergos.
- John Foster Dulles 1935–1952 (chairman) – US Secretary of State, 1953–1959; senior partner, Sullivan & Cromwell law firm.
- Charles William Eliot 1914–1917 – president of Harvard, 1869–1909.
- John Robert Evans 1982–1996 (chairman) – president of the University of Toronto 1972–1978; founding director of the Population, Health and Nutrition Department of the World Bank
- Ann M. Fudge, 2006–2015, former chairman and CEO, Young & Rubicam Brands, New York
- Frederick Taylor Gates 1913–1923 – John D. Rockefeller Sr.'s principal advisor.
- Helene D. Gayle, 2010–2019, president and CEO of CARE.
- Stephen Jay Gould 1993–2002 – author; professor and curator, Museum of Comparative Zoology, Harvard University.
- Rajat Gupta, 2006–11, former director, Goldman Sachs, Procter & Gamble, AMR Corporation; Special Advisor to the UN Secretary-General; former managing director, McKinsey & Company.
- Wallace Harrison 1951–1961 – Rockefeller family architect; lead architect for the UN Headquarters complex.
- Thomas J. Healey, 2003–2012, partner, Healey Development LLC; teaching course at Harvard University's John F. Kennedy School of Government; formerly with Goldman Sachs and an Assistant Secretary of the U.S. Treasury.
- Alice S. Huang, senior faculty associate, California Institute of Technology.
- Charles Evans Hughes 1917–1921; 1925–1928 – Chief Justice of the United States, 1930–1941.
- Robert A. Lovett 1949–1961 – US Secretary of Defense, 1951–1953.
- Monica Lozano, 2012–2018, CEO, ImpreMedia, LLC
- Yo-Yo Ma 1999–2002 – cellist.
- Strive Masiyiwa, 2003–2018, Zimbabwe a businessman and cellphone pioneer, founding Econet Wireless.
- Jessica T. Mathews, president, Carnegie Endowment for International Peace, Washington, D.C.
- John J. McCloy chairman: 1946–1949; 1953–1958 – prominent US presidential advisor; chairman of the Ford Foundation, 1958–1965; chairman of the council on Foreign Relations.
- Bill Moyers 1969–1981 – journalist.
- Diana Natalicio, 2004–2014, president, The University of Texas at El Paso
- Ngozi Okonjo-Iweala, 2009–2018, Finance Minister of Nigeria; former managing director of the World Bank; former Foreign Minister of Nigeria.
- Sandra Day O'Connor, 2006–2013, associate justice, retired, Supreme Court of the United States
- James F. Orr, III, (board chair), president and chief executive officer, LandingPoint Capital, Boston, Massachusetts.
- Richard Parsons, 2007–2021, chairman of the board, Citigroup Inc.
- Surin Pitsuwan, 2010–2012, secretary general of ASEAN (2007–2012) and Thai politician.
- Mamphela Ramphele, chairperson, Circle Capital Ventures, Cape Town, South Africa.
- David Rockefeller Jr., 2006–2016, chair of foundation board Dec. 2010– ; vice-chairman of Rockefeller Family & Associates; director and former chair, Rockefeller & Co., Inc.; current trustee of the Museum of Modern Art.
- John D. Rockefeller 1913–1923.
- John D. Rockefeller Jr. chairman: 1917–1939.
- John D. Rockefeller III chairman: 1952–1972.
- John D. Rockefeller IV 1976–81.
- Judith Rodin, president of the foundation (2005–2016); ex-officio member of the board
- Julius Rosenwald 1917–1931 – chairman of Sears Roebuck, 1932–1939.
- John Rowe M.D., 2007–2019, professor at the Columbia University Mailman School of Public Health; former chairman and CEO of Aetna Inc.
- Dean Rusk 1950–1961 – US Secretary of State, 1961–1969.
- Raymond W. Smith, chairman, Rothschild, Inc., New York; chairman of Arlington Capital Partners; chairman of Verizon Ventures; and a trustee of the Carnegie Corporation of New York.
- Frank Stanton 1961–1966? – president of CBS, 1946–1971.
- Arthur Hays Sulzberger 1939–1957 – publisher of The New York Times, 1935–1961.
- Paul Volcker 1975–1979 – chairman, board of governors, Federal Reserve Board; president, New York Federal Reserve Bank.
- Thomas J. Watson Jr. 1963–1970? – president of IBM, 1952–1971.
- James Wolfensohn – former president of the World Bank.
- George D. Woods 1961–1967 – president of the World Bank, 1963–1968.
- Võ Tòng Xuân, 2002–2010, vice president for academic affairs, Tan Tao University, Ho Chi Minh City; former rector of An Giang University, the second university in Vietnam's Mekong Delta.
- Owen D. Young 1928–1939 – chairman of GE, 1922–1939, 1942–1945.

=== Presidents ===
- John D. Rockefeller Jr. – February 11, 1913 – November 6, 1917
- George E. Vincent – November 6, 1917 – September 20, 1929; member of the John D. Rockefeller/Frederick T. Gates General Education Board (1914–1929)
- Max Mason – September 20, 1929 – May 30, 1936
- Raymond B. Fosdick – May 30, 1936 – August 22, 1948; brother of American clergyman Harry Emerson Fosdick
- Chester Barnard – August 22, 1948 – July 17, 1952; Bell System executive and author of landmark 1938 book, The Functions of the Executive
- Dean Rusk – July 17, 1952 – January 19, 1961; United States Secretary of State from 1961 to 1969
- J. George Harrar – January 20, 1961 – October 3, 1972; plant pathologist, "generally regarded as the father of 'the Green Revolution.'"
- John Hilton Knowles – October 3, 1972 – December 31, 1979; physician, general director of the Massachusetts General Hospital (1962–1971).
- Richard Lyman – January 1, 1980 – January 11, 1988; president of Stanford University (1970–1980).
- Peter Goldmark Jr. – January 11, 1988 – December 31, 1997; former executive director of the Port Authority of New York and New Jersey.
- Gordon Conway – January 1, 1998 – December 31, 2004; an agricultural ecologist and former president of the Royal Geographical Society.
- Judith Rodin – January 1, 2005 – March 1, 2017; former president of the University of Pennsylvania, and provost, chair of the Department of Psychology, Yale University.
- Rajiv Shah – March 1, 2017 –, distinguished fellow in residence, Georgetown University; previously administrator of the United States Agency for International Development (USAID) from 2010 to 2015.

== Grant recipients ==
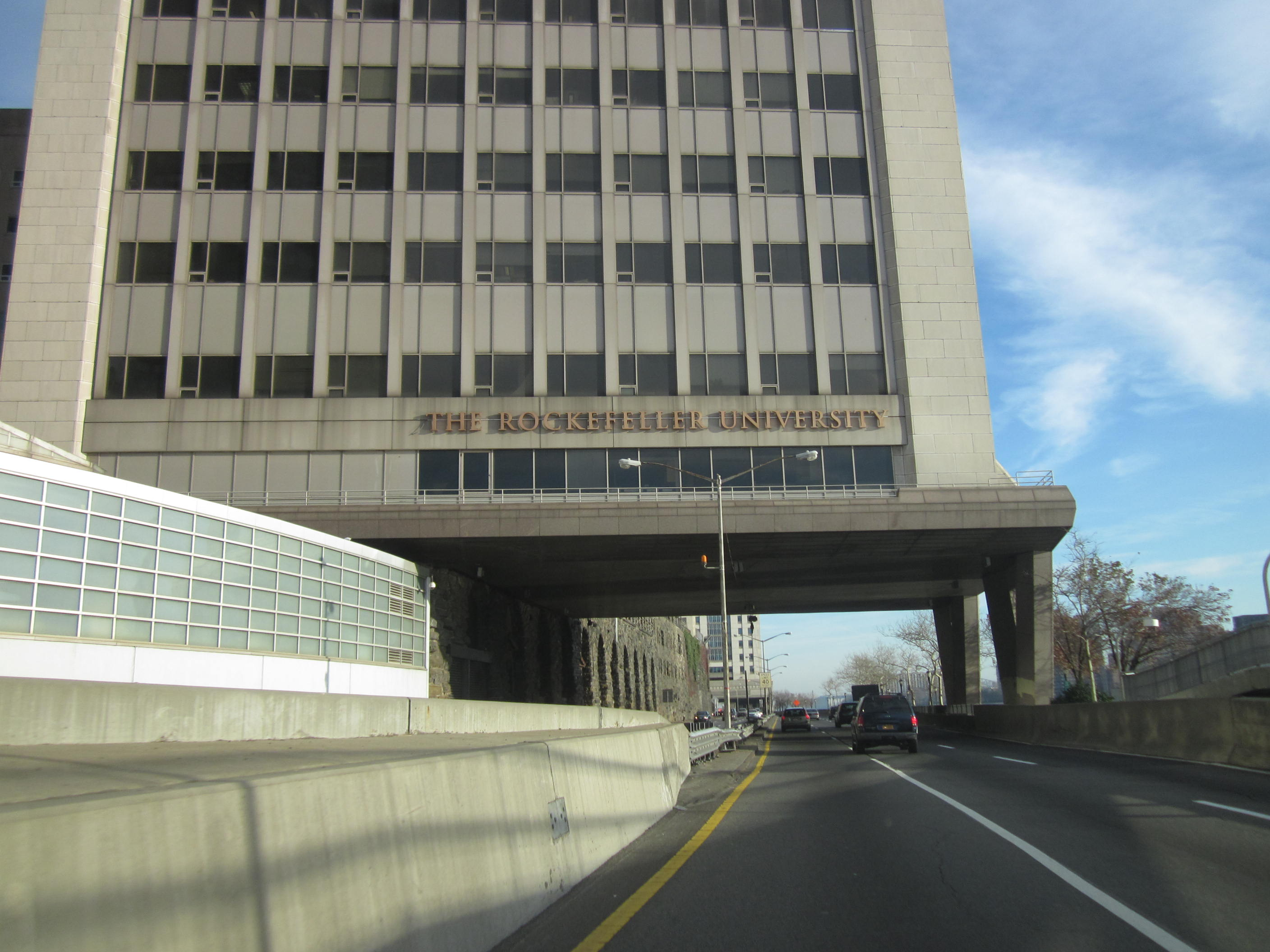
Rockefeller University, as seen from the FDR Drive, New York, NY, 2011

- Rockefeller University
- Council on Foreign Relations (CFR) – Especially the notable 1939–45 War and Peace Studies that advised the US State Department and the US government on World War II strategy and forward planning
- Royal Institute of International Affairs (RIIA) in London
- Carnegie Endowment for International Peace in Washington – Support of the diplomatic training program
- Brookings Institution in Washington – Significant funding of research grants in the fields of economic and social studies
- World Bank in Washington – Helped finance the training of foreign officials through the Economic Development Institute
- Harvard University – Grants to the Center for International Affairs and medical, business and administration Schools
- Yale University – Substantial funding to the Institute of International Studies
- Princeton University – Office of Population Research
- Columbia University – Establishment of the Russia Institute
- University of the Philippines, Los Baños – Funded research for the College of Agriculture and built an international house for foreign students
- McGill University – The Rockefeller Foundation funded the Montreal Neurological Institute, on the request of Wilder Penfield, a Canadian neurosurgeon, who had met David Rockefeller years before
- Library of Congress – Funded a project for photographic copies of the complete card catalogues for the world's fifty leading libraries
- Bodleian Library at Oxford University – Grant for a building to house five million volumes
- Population Council of New York – Funded fellowships
- Social Science Research Council – Major funding for fellowships and grants-in-aid
- National Bureau of Economic Research
- National Institute of Public Health of Japan (formerly The Institute of Public Health (国立公衆衛生院, Kokuritsu Kōshū Eisei-in) "School of Public Health"ja) in Tokyo (1938)
- Group of Thirty – In 1978 the foundation invited Geoffrey Bell to set up this high-powered and influential advisory group on global financial issues, whose former chairman was longtime Rockefeller associate Paul Volcker, until his death in 2019
- London School of Economics – funded research and general budget
- Geneva Graduate Institute of International Studies – funded general budget from 1927 to 1954
- University of Lyon, France – funded research in natural sciences, social sciences, medicine and the new building of the medical school during the 1920s–1930s
- The Trinidad Regional Virus Laboratory
- The Results for Development Institute – funded the Center for Health Market Innovations
- Mahidol University in Thailand
- VoteRiders – a nationwide nonprofit founded in 2012 to promote a resilient democracy through voter ID access

== See also ==
- Asia Society
- Association Internationale Africaine
- CGIAR
- Eugenics in the United States
- Industrial relations
- Philanthropy in the United States
- Rockefeller Brothers Fund
- Rockefeller family
- Social sciences
