= Cyrus Gates Farmstead =

Historic house in New York, United States

- U.S. National Register of Historic Places
- U.S. Historic district
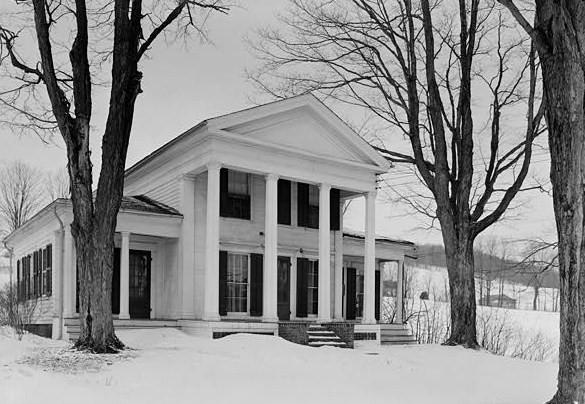
- Cyrus Gates Farmstead, 1963

- Location within New York Location within the United States
- Nearest city: Maine, New York
- Coordinates: 42°14′50″N 76°2′19″W
- Area: 130 acres (53 ha)
- Built: 1848
- Architectural style: Greek Revival
- NRHP reference No.: 98001549
- Added to NRHP: January 11, 1999

The Cyrus Gates Farmstead is located in Maine, New York. Cyrus Gates was a cartographer and map maker for New York State, as well as an abolitionist. The great granddaughter of Cyrus-Louise Gates-Gunsalus has stated that from 1848 until the end of slavery in the United States in 1865, the Cyrus Gates Farmstead was a station or stop on the Underground Railroad (Woodward 1973). Its owners, Cyrus and Arabella Gates, were outspoken abolitionists as well as active and vital members of their community. Historian Shirley L. Woodward states that through those years escaped slaves came through the Gates' station.

One runaway female slave, a 16-year-old girl named Margaret "Marge" Cruiser was so comfortable with the Gates family that she decided to stay at their station and live with them. Marge ended up spending the rest of her life with the Gates and is buried in the cemetery next to the house. (Woodward 1973 pp 52–53). Margaret was also known as the wife of Thomas "Old Bay Tom" Crocker. Mr. Crocker was famous for being the first African-American to be elected as mayor of Binghamton, New York, albeit a protest vote that was reversed in the election of 1872. (Smith 2014).

== Role of the Farmstead ==
Owning a station or being a conductor on the Underground Railroad (UGRR) was most certainly illegal behavior, although not considered unethical behavior by many people. In light of this, participation in the Underground Railroad was very secretive; records were not usually, if ever kept of the comings and goings at stations. It would be an unwise act to record illegal behavior, especially in New York where the Northern Democrats were strong. In fact Cyrus' own brother William Gates was an ardent Copperhead and after an argument with Cyrus over "breaking the law" moved out of the family house. In light of this it is easier to see why much of the history of this vast network of stations has been passed down through oral history.

The oral history of the Cyrus Gates Farmstead says that the main house was used before and after the Civil War as a station on the Underground Railway and that Cyrus and Arabella Gates were station hosts or conductors. The following is a statement made by Cyrus Gates' great-granddaughter, Louise Gates-Gunsalus (1894-1982):

"I know of only one route in Maine township for the travel and care of slaves. This route has, as far as I have been told, its first point of contact in a home in Vestal, New York. Its next station, or stop, the Luce home on Route 26, south of Union Center, and next, to the Russell Gates home. The next and last known point was the Bushnell home on the Newark Valley, Dryden Road at the crossroad where the Bushnell house stood. From there the next station was in or near Ithaca, but where I have no information." (Woodward 1973 p. 52)

As UGRR historian Milton Sernett has referenced: To facilitate the harboring and if necessary the hiding of runaway slaves, the Gates built a hiding place inside the south wing of their attic. Inside the master bedroom upstairs, an access panel was made inside of one of the closets. The old leather thong used to close the panel to the wall is still there to this day. This panel would give assess to an area that was roughly 20 feet by 10 feet by four feet high. It is not known if runaways were actually ever forced to retreat to this area. There would probably have to be a high level of concern, such as a bounty hunter in the area to necessitate the hiding of slaves inside the house. (Sernett 2002, p162)

== Underground Railroad Connection ==
The Southern Tier of New York State was a key geographic area for runaway slaves, whether on their own or as a part of the Underground Railroad (UGRR). Broome County, New York stands midway between a Philadelphia UGRR launch point such as William Still's and the significant UGRR station zone of abolitionist Gerrit Smith in Peterboro, NY. As the most well known of UGRR conductors, Harriet Tubman frequently traveled this area. She made several trips from the South to Upstate New York stations such as the Smiths and possibly the Gates, St. James AME Zion Church (Ithaca, New York), and eventually to final stops in places like St. Catharines, Ontario. In addition, Harriet Tubman lived in Auburn, New York where as a member of the Thompson AME Zion Church she started the Harriet Tubman Home for the Aged.

Slaves traveled from the South to the North from station to station mostly under the cover of darkness. Often, once runaways got into the states of Pennsylvania and Ohio, they were not in much danger of being captured by bounty hunters or the police. Runaways in New York often worked and did chores with the station owners during the day.

In 1850 the United States government, in trying to prevent a war between the slave and non-slave states, passed the new and more aggressive Fugitive Slave Act. This law gave bounty hunters from the South more rights to chase slaves into the North and forced Northern police officers into arresting and returning runaway slaves that they captured. Abolitionists hated the Fugitive Slave Act, and started working with more intensity and urgency to find ways to end slavery. Southern slave plantation owners hated Northern abolitionists because the abolitionists wanted to end slavery which in turn would mean that the plantation owners would lose their laborers, considered as their chattel.

The average slave was worth a lot of money to a slave owner-about $1,000 in the 1860s, so owners would pay bounty hunters to bring runaway slaves back to them or pay upon delivery of the runaway slave.

== Historic Registry ==
The Cyrus Gates Farmstead was placed on the National Register of Historic Places in 1999. In addition to the main Greek Revival farmhouse, the farmstead contains two barns (one built in 1836), a tenant farmer's house, a bee keeper's house or sugar shack, a blacksmith's shop, a four-seat outhouse, and a pole barn. The placement was based on the home's Greek Revival architecture, the importance of Cyrus Gates, a cartographer and mapmaker for the State of New York and its strong oral history as a stop on the Underground Railroad.

== See also ==
- Underground Railroad
- Abolitionism in the United States
- List of Underground Railway sites
- Thomas Garret
- Cyrus Gates
- Jermain Wesley Loguen
- Gerrit Smith
- William Still
- Harriet Tubman
