= Nariva Swamp =

Freshwater wetland in Trinidad and Tobago

Coordinates: 10°25′N 61°05′W

Designations

Ramsar Wetland
- Official name: Nariva Swamp
- Designated: 21 December 1992
- Reference no.: 577

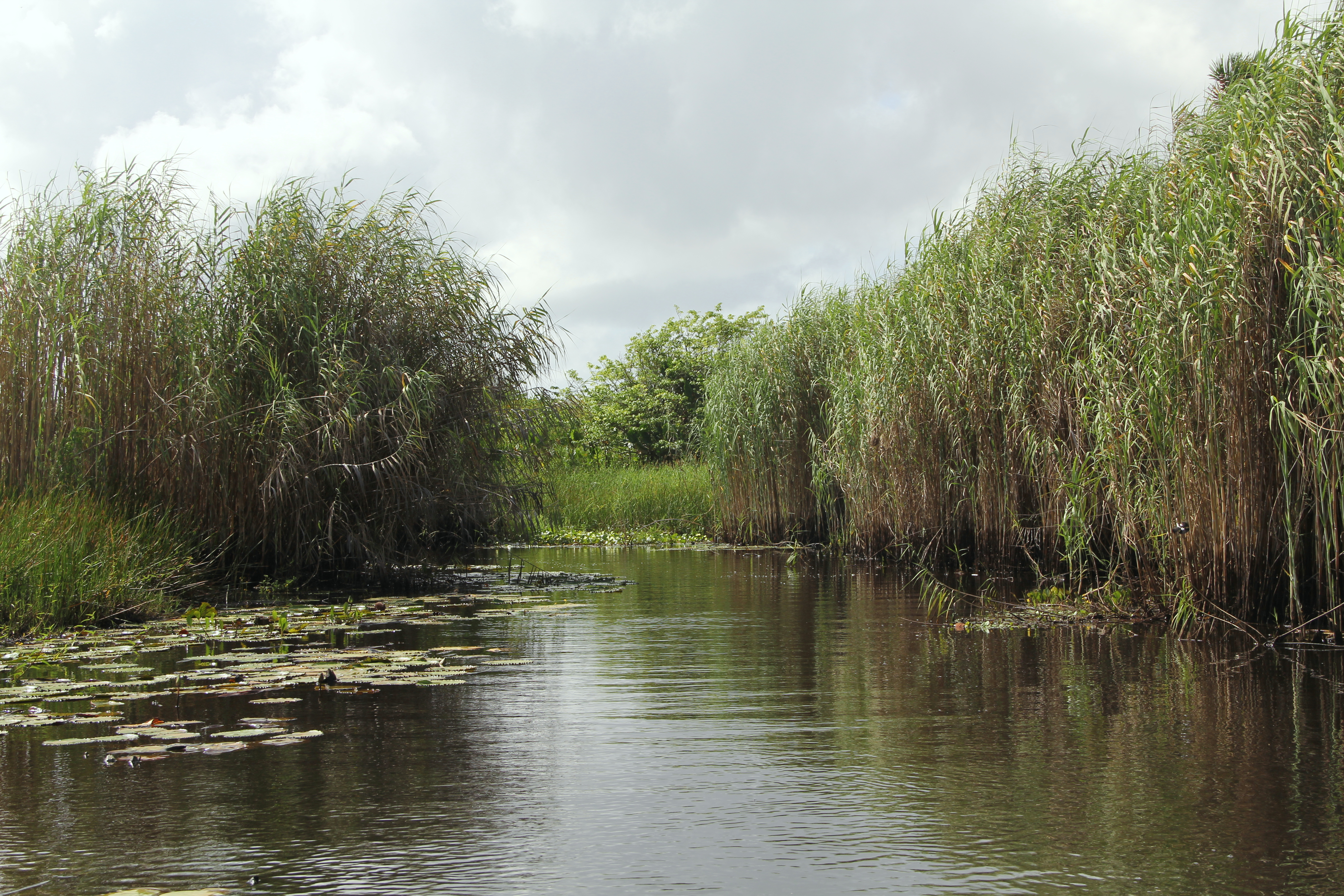
Inside the Nariva Swamp

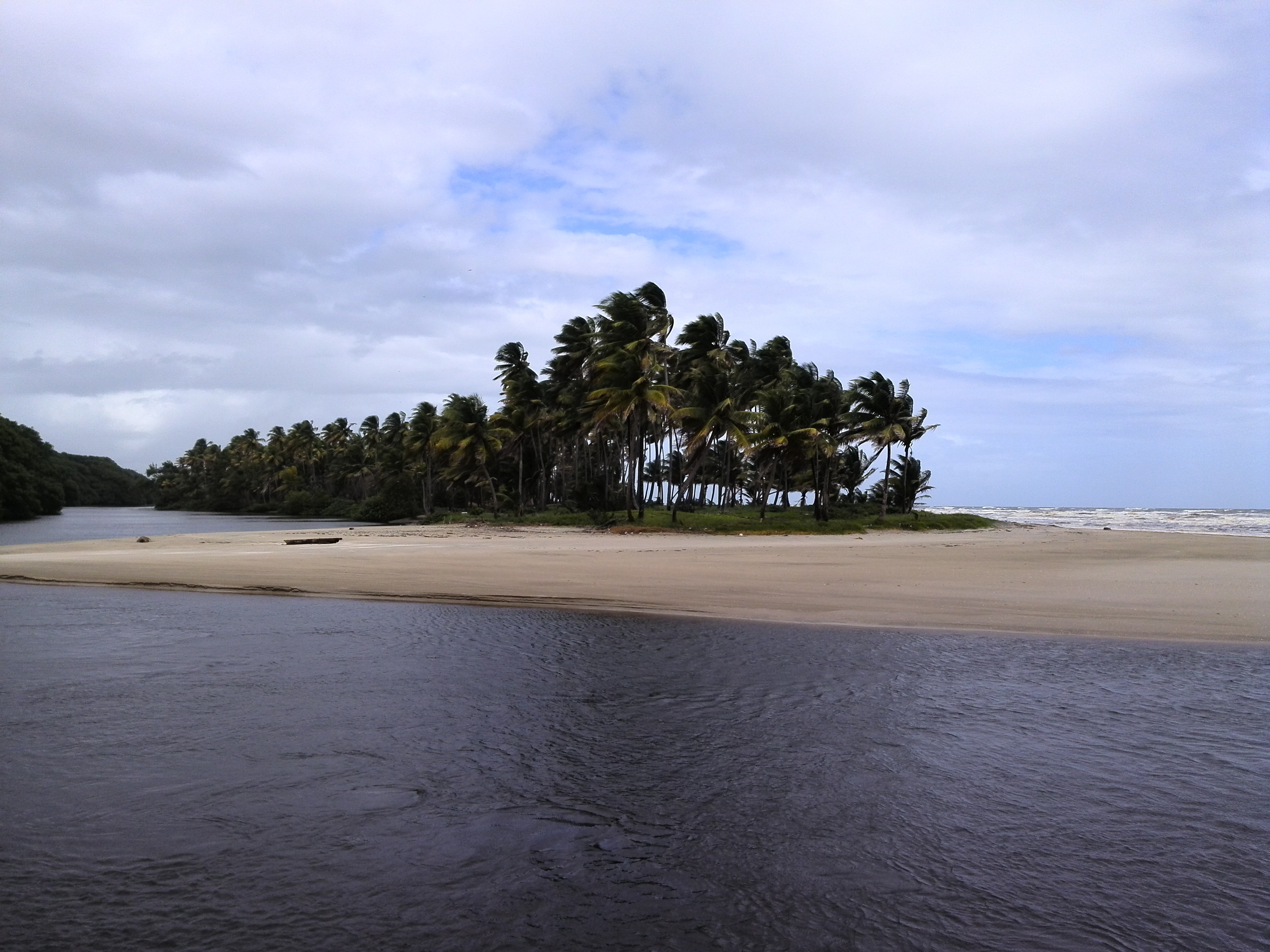
The mouth of the Nariva River is bordered by a thin strip of land on its east, opposite of the main swamp (left).

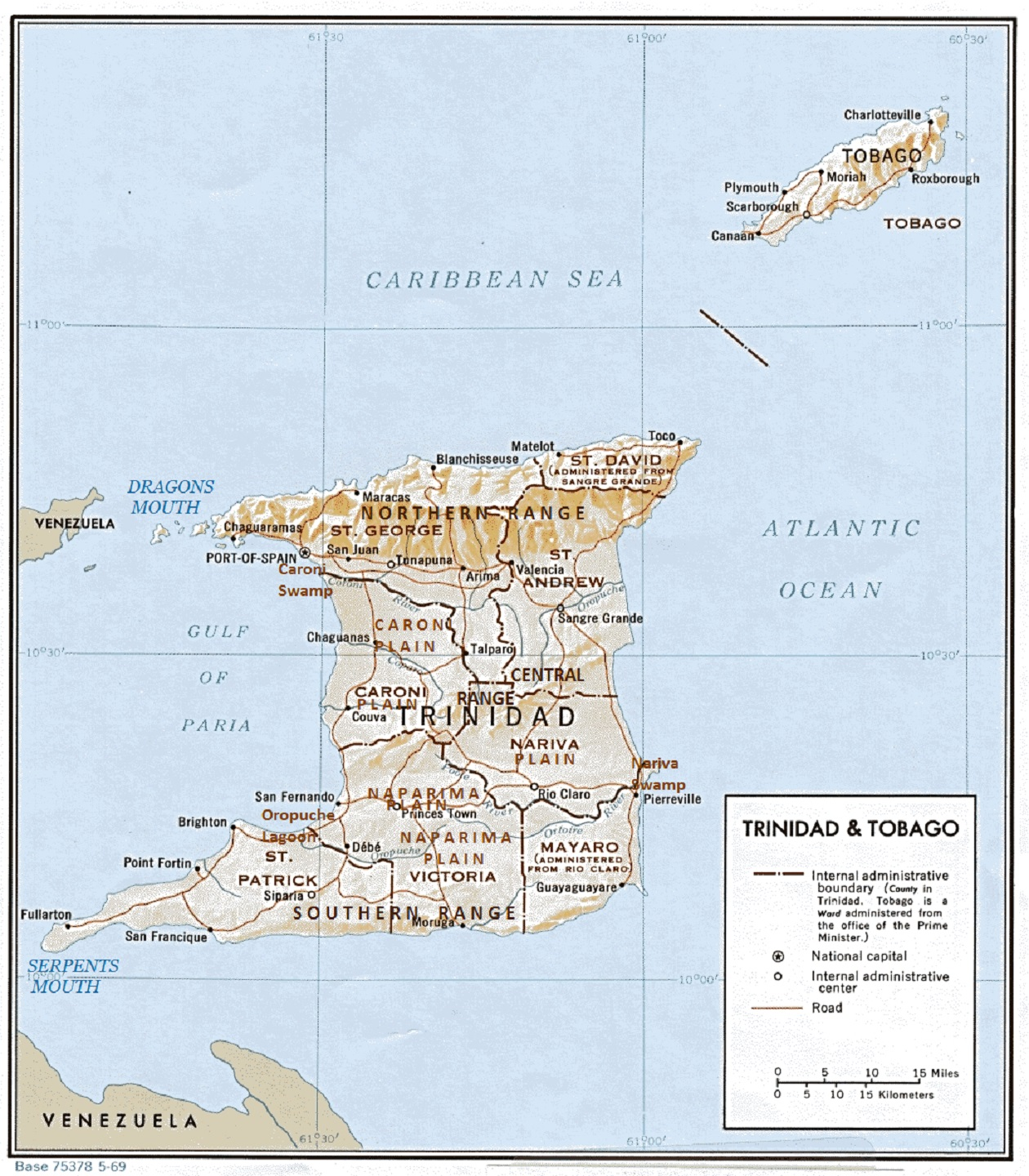
A physical relief map of Trinidad showing the Nariva Plain and Nariva Swamp in the southeast.

The Nariva Swamp is the largest freshwater wetland in Trinidad and Tobago and has been designated a Wetland of International Importance under the Ramsar Convention. The swamp is located on the east coast of Trinidad, immediately inland from the Manzanilla Bay through Biche and covers over 60 square kilometres (23 mi^{2}). The Nariva Swamp is extremely biodiverse, being home to 45 mammal species, 39 reptile species, 33 fish species, 204 bird species, 19 frog species, 213 insect species and 15 mollusc species. All this contained in just 60 square kilometers.

== Description ==
The area provides important habitat for waterfowl and is key habitat for the West Indian manatee (Trichechus manatus)., caimans, anacondas, boas, red howler monkeys, white-fronted capuchin monkeys, numerous species of parrots, including both the blue-and-gold macaw and red-bellied macaws, as well as many wetland and savanna birds, like herons and white storks.

Four major wetland vegetation types occur in the Nariva Swamp - mangrove swamp forest, palm forest, swamp wood, and freshwater marsh.

== Virus research ==
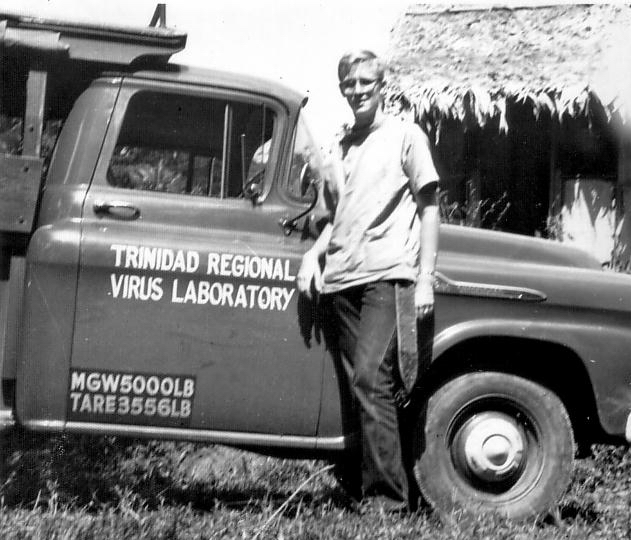
Virus Laboratory Field Assistant, Nariva Swamp, Trinidad. 1959

The Trinidad Regional Virus Lab (TRVL) (now CAREC) conducted research on arboviruses there in past decades.

One portion of the swamp, the Bush Bush Wildlife Sanctuary is historically important as a field site for the Trinidad Regional Virus Laboratory - now part of the Caribbean Epidemiology Center (Carec), which played a key role in the study of tropical mosquito-borne diseases.

== Conservation ==
The Nariva Swamp, 6,234 hectares (15,400 acres), was declared to be a forest reserve in 1954. The Bush Bush section of the Nariva Swamp 1,408 hectares (3,480 acres) is an area of high ground that was declared as a wildlife sanctuary in 1968, and a prohibited area in 1989 by Dr. Keith Rowley (legal notice no 78 by then Minister of Agriculture, Land and Marine Resources). The site was thus reserved as a local and international research centre, and in theory no hunting or harvesting was allowed on the site.

The Nariva Swamp is protected by 3 main pieces of legislation: the Forests Act, Chapter 66: 01; the Conservation of Wildlife Act, Chapter 67: 01; the State Lands Act, Chapter 57: 01. Offences taken to court are usually related to wildlife poaching and tree felling. This was not entirely successful and encroachment by squatters was ongoing (Ramsar, 1996). The Nariva Swamp has been threatened in the past by illegal squatting; the conversion of land to cannabis and rice farming, illegal grazing of livestock in the game sanctuary, overfishing and illegal timber harvesting, illegal hunting and excessive trapping of birds for the pet trade (Ramsar, 1996).

The Nariva Windbelt Forest Reserve of 6,267 acres (25.36 km^{2}) was declared under the Forests Act on March 18, 1954. This designation gives the Forestry Division the authority to manage the area with reference to felling of trees, damage by negligence in felling any tree or dragging any timber, fires, and forest produce (CFCA, 1997). The year after the establishment of the Nariva Windbelt Forest Reserve (1955) the Manzanilla Extension, 383.2 hectares was declared a demarcated Forest Reserve.

Scientist T. H. G. Aitken from the Trinidad Regional Virus Laboratory, proposed the Bush Bush wildlife sanctuary in the Nariva Swamp as a nature reserve in 1960 (Bacon et al., 1979). In 1962, the International Council for Bird Preservation raised a protest against proposed logging operations by the Forestry Division in the Nariva Swamp; the Council protested that it would reduce the high bird diversity in the area (Bacon et al., 1979). At the end of his study of parrots and macaws, scientists Dr. F. Nottebohm and Carl Carlozzi recommended the complete legal protection of the Bush Bush and Bois Neuf islands for the birds and other wildlife, the mud volcanoes on Bois Neuf and the tourist potential they contained.

Bonadie and Bacon (1998) confirmed that roosting sites for orange-winged parrots (Amazona amazonica) and red-bellied macaws (Ara manilata Bodd.) were concentrated in Roystonea and Mauritia palm stands in the Nariva Swamp and they only counted 136 parrots (a reduction from 600 in 1969) and 224 macaws. The Conservation Ordinance allows orange-winged parrots to be shot as crop pests, so that if the palm swamp forest is eliminated they will become greater pests of cocoa and crops and will face greater levels of irate shooting. Parrots and macaws fed on seven plant species with the major concentration of feeding on Mauritia setigera and Roystonea oleracea palm fruit. The third psittacine species observed in the swamp were green-rumped parrotlets (Forpus passerinus Lafr.).

As a result of the public interest and a grant of $5000 U.S. from the New York Zoological Society, the Bush Bush area was declared a Wildlife Sanctuary on 16 July 1968 (Bacon et al., 1979). In recognition of this interest, in July 1968, the Trinidad and Tobago Tourist Board held a meeting with the Forestry Division on the potential of the mouth of the Nariva River and its eastern bank for tourism. Six years later in 1974, the Tourist Board offered financial aid of $7000 to clear and maintain the Bush Bush canal to allow easier access. However, this money was never allocated to the Forestry Division for this purpose (Bacon et al., 1979).

Keeler and Pemberton (1996) claim that one of the positive features of the conflict over the use of the Nariva Swamp is that both local and international environmental groups are firmly behind the idea of sustainable use by Nariva by people, including its use for agriculture. There is very little sentiment or rhetoric for simply making Nariva into a park or denying all uses except ecotourism. This attitude makes sustainable consensus solutions more feasible.

Keeler and Pemberton were co-creators of an interdisciplinary research team of University of the West Indies and University of Georgia scientists established to conduct research on the sustainable development of the Nariva Swamp. Their objectives were to promote wise use of the Ramsar site, to improve the welfare of the Kernahan community and the wider society from the use of Nariva's resources and to contribute to UWI teaching and research. The sub components were (1) Social Assessment and Conservation Management of Nariva Swamp (2) The Contribution of Nutrition to Sustainable Development of the Nariva Swamp (3) Hydrology and Water Management (4) Soil Properties and Implications for Sustainable Management (5) The Development of a Nariva Swamp National Park as an Eco-Tourism Site (6) Sustainable use and commercialisation of wetland resource organisms. Basically the project called for economic development that would have required a lot of professional management expertise for its continuance – professional job creation.

Left out of this project, the centre for Gender and Development Studies (CGDS) at the University of the West Indies obtained funding from the Canadian International Development Agency (CIDA) and other sources and conducted gender sensitive research project in the swamp. The research was conducted in collaboration with the Island, Sustainability, Livelihood and Equity Programme (ISLE). ISLE was in turn a collaborative project of the University of the Philippines, Hasanuddin University in Indonesia, Dalhousie University, Nova Scotia Agricultural College, UWI and the Technical University of Nova Scotia. The Nariva human community was studied by young participant researchers. They used interviews, participant observation, ethnography and participatory approaches that included workshops on time lines, resource use charts and community and benefit flow charts. The governance aspect was to look at governance and social control at various levels (micro, macro), history of policy, how and why policies changed over time, impact of international policy community on local decision making and policy formation and a gender analysis of the policy assumptions (Lans, 2007).

Nariva Swamp has been a legal entity since 1968. Its legal status in Trinidad was insufficient to preserve its ecological status. Active lobbying and effort was expended to give the swamp the status of an internationally recognised entity and therefore remove it from solely national political decisions. International recognition came in 1992, when Trinidad and Tobago designated Nariva Swamp for the List of Wetlands of International Importance maintained under the Ramsar Convention. The Nariva Swamp was designated as a Wetland of International Importance (especially as a waterfowl habitat) under the Ramsar convention on 21 April 1993. Concerned officials of the Ministry of Agriculture lobbied for this international status to protect the swamp from local political concerns and to make it easier to access international funding. Instruments were laid on December 21, 1992, with respect to the declaration of the Nariva Swamp as a Ramsar site. The total area of the Ramsar site is 6,234 hectares, which is the same area as the Nariva Swamp Prohibited Area and proposed National Park (CFCA, 1997).

The Nariva Swamp was included on the Montreux Record in 1993 in Kushiro, Japan (CFCA, 1997). This is a register of Ramsar sites where changes in ecological character have occurred, are occurring, or are likely to occur as a result of technological developments, pollution or other human interference. Ms. Molly Gaskin, and Ms. Karilyn Shephard of the Pointe á Pierre Wildfowl Trust, and Ms. Nadra Nathai-Gyan, of the Wildlife Section, Forestry Division, and Dr. Carol James, at the time with the UNDP-GEF, were present at this meeting.

The Nariva Swamp is threatened by rice cultivation in the northwest and watermelon cultivation in the southwest. It has also been affected by channelisation in the swamp and deforestation of its watershed.

The entire Nariva Swamp was declared a prohibited area under Section 2 of the Forests Act, Chapter 66:01.
