= Nariva River =

River in Trinidad and Tobago

Coordinates: 10.42807°N 61.03244°W

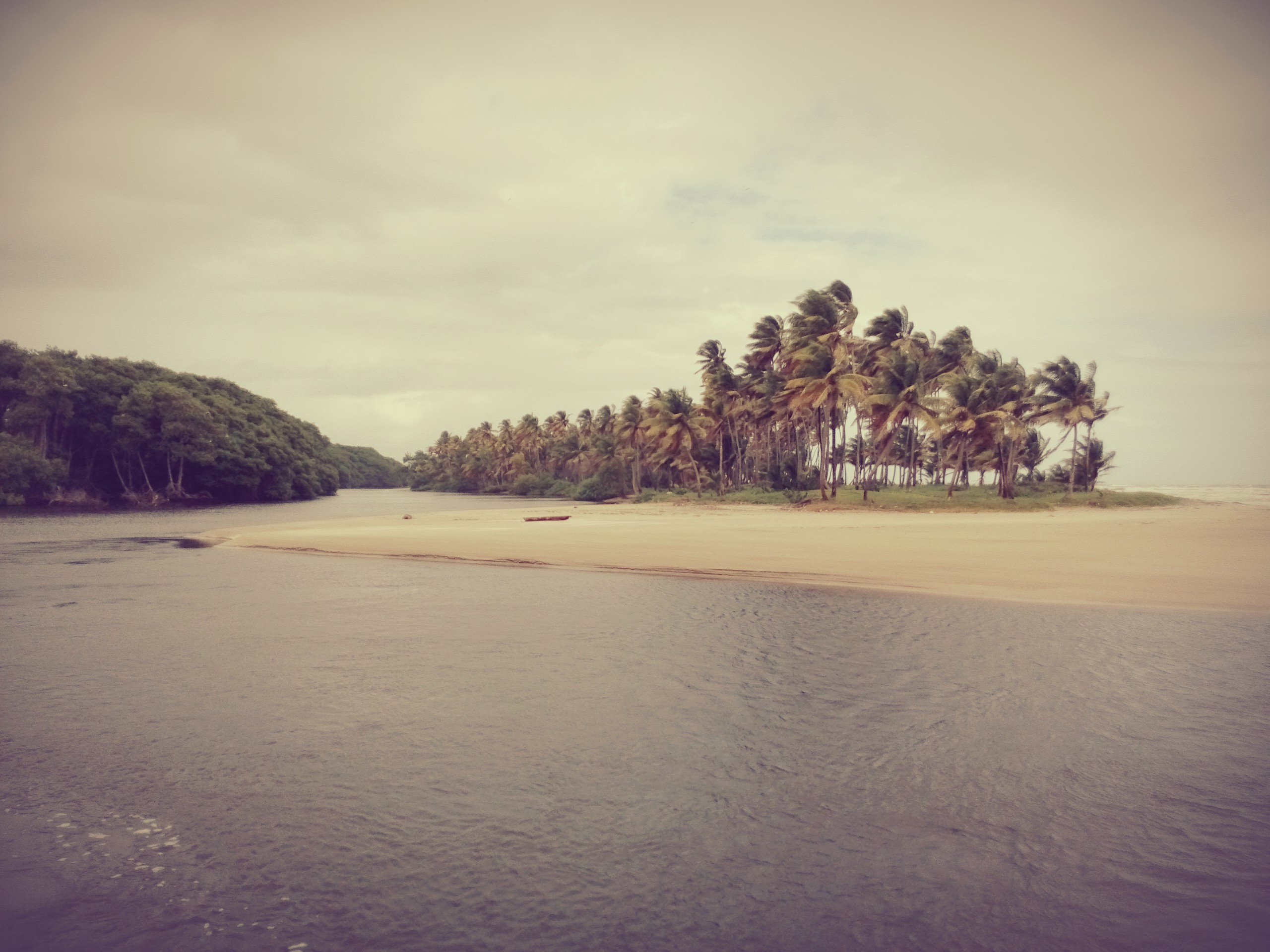
Nariva River mouth

The Nariva River is one of the larger rivers in Trinidad and Tobago. It drains the Nariva Swamp on the east coast of Trinidad. The river is a dark cream in colour. The bridge used to be a box type iron but it has been replaced with concrete and it also has been raised to prevent flooding. It is also good for kayaking. West Indian Manatees have been known to use this water course.
