= Maine, New York =

- Town
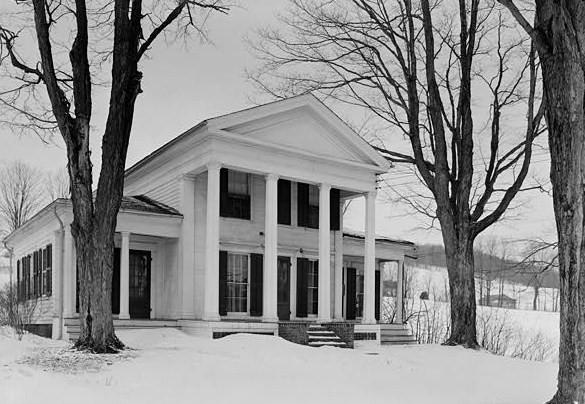
- Cyrus Gates House in Maine

- Logo
- Motto(s): "Where culture, recreation, nature, and history meet."
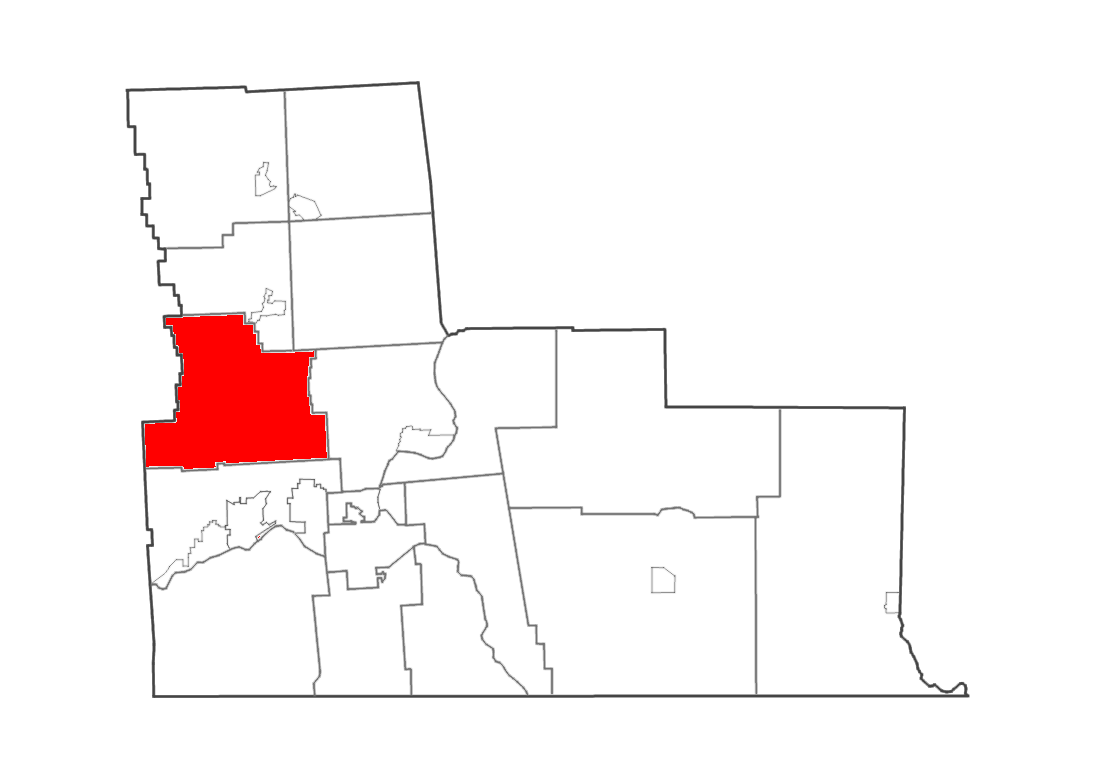
- Location in Broome County

- Location within New York Location within the United States
- Coordinates: 42°12′19″N 76°1′33″W
- Country: United States
- State: New York
- County: Broome
- Organized: March 27, 1848

Government
  - Type: Town Council
  - Town Supervisor: Jim Tokos
  - Town Council: Members' List: • Ernest W. Palmer; • Cara Holland-Hauer; • Peggy Bowles

Area
  - Total: 45.76 sq mi (118.52 km^{2})
  - Land: 45.64 sq mi (118.22 km^{2})
  - Water: 0.12 sq mi (0.30 km^{2})
- Elevation: 1,385 ft (422 m)

Population (2010)
  - Total: 5,377
  - Estimate (2016): 5,238
  - Density: 114.8/sq mi (44.31/km^{2})
- Time zone: UTC-5 (Eastern (EST))
  - Summer (DST): UTC-4 (EDT)
- ZIP Codes: 13802 (Maine); 13760 (Endicott); 13777 (Glen Aubrey); 13790 (Johnson City); 13811 (Newark Valley); 13905 (Binghamton)
- Area code: 607
- FIPS code: 36-44611
- GNIS feature ID: 979184
- Website: townofmaineny.gov

Maine is a town in Broome County, New York, United States. The population was 5,377 at the 2010 census.

The town is on the western border of the county and is northwest of Binghamton.

Maine is home to Greater Binghamton Airport, serving Binghamton and the surrounding area.

== History ==
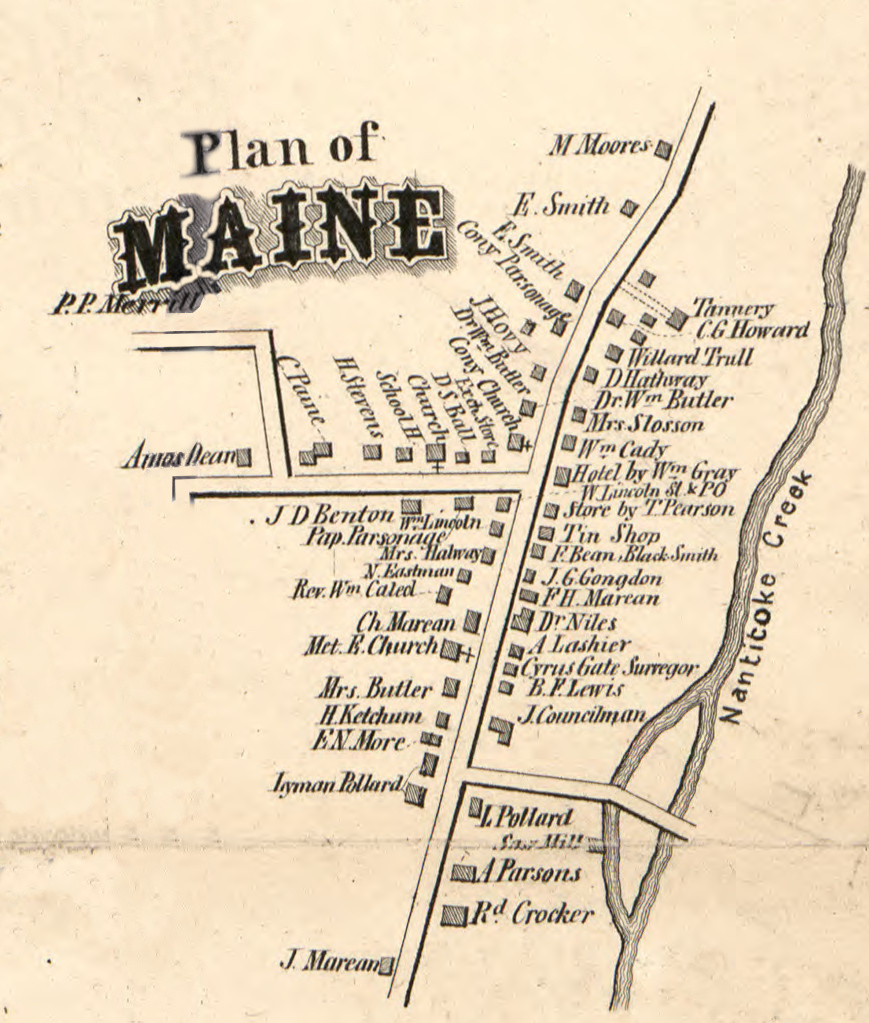
Plan of Maine (1855)

The area was first settled in 1794. The town of Maine was formed from the northern part of the town of Union in 1848.

The Maine Central School (also known as J. Ralph Ingals School) was listed on the National Register of Historic Places in 1998. The Cyrus Gates Farmstead was listed in 1999.

== Geography ==
According to the United States Census Bureau, the town has a total area of 45.8 square miles (118.5 km^{2}), of which 45.6 square miles (118.2 km^{2}) is land and 0.12 square miles (0.3 km^{2}), or 0.26%, is water.

The western town line is the border of Tioga County.

New York State Route 26 is a north–south highway in the town. New York State Route 38B crosses the southwest corner of Maine.

Maine is the birthplace of Lamont Bowers, a key adviser to John D. Rockefeller.

== Demographics ==
Historical population
Census	Pop.	Note	%±
1850	1,843		—
1860	1,609		−12.7%
1870	2,035		26.5%
1880	2,129		4.6%
1890	1,692		−20.5%
1900	1,534		−9.3%
1910	1,363		−11.1%
1920	1,360		−0.2%
1930	1,628		19.7%
1940	2,076		27.5%
1950	2,315		11.5%
1960	3,931		69.8%
1970	5,842		48.6%
1980	5,262		−9.9%
1990	5,576		6.0%
2000	5,459		−2.1%
2010	5,377		−1.5%
2016 (est.)	5,238		−2.6%
U.S. Decennial Census

As of the census of 2000, there were 5,459 people, 2,036 households, and 1,531 families residing in the town. The population density was 119.4 inhabitants per square mile (46.1/km^{2}). There were 2,181 housing units at an average density of 47.7 per square mile (18.4/km^{2}). The racial makeup of the town was 97.89% White, 0.44% African American, 0.05% Native American, 0.53% Asian, 0.02% Pacific Islander, 0.07% from other races, and 0.99% from two or more races. Hispanic or Latino of any race were 0.55% of the population.

There were 2,036 households, out of which 33.7% had children under the age of 18 living with them, 62.5% were married couples living together, 8.2% had a female householder with no husband present, and 24.8% were non-families. 19.9% of all households were made up of individuals, and 8.3% had someone living alone who was 65 years of age or older. The average household size was 2.68 and the average family size was 3.08.

In the town, the population was spread out, with 26.3% under the age of 18, 6.7% from 18 to 24, 29.0% from 25 to 44, 24.9% from 45 to 64, and 13.1% who were 65 years of age or older. The median age was 39 years. For every 100 females, there were 101.1 males. For every 100 females age 18 and over, there were 99.8 males.

The median income for a household in the town was $39,656, and the median income for a family was $42,514. Males had a median income of $33,363 versus $21,875 for females. The per capita income for the town was $17,773. About 4.5% of families and 5.9% of the population were below the poverty line, including 8.3% of those under age 18 and 5.6% of those age 65 or over.

== Communities and locations in Maine ==
- Bowers Corners – A former location in the town.
- Greater Binghamton Airport/Edwin A. Link Field (BGM) – The municipal airport of Binghamton.
- Maine – The hamlet of Maine is near the western town line on NY-26.
- East Maine – A hamlet southwest of the airport at the junction of County Roads 49 and 65.
- Nanticoke Creek – A stream flowing southward through the town; tributary of the Susquehanna River.
- New Ireland – A hamlet by the eastern town line on County Road 89.
- North Maine – A former community in the town.
- Tiona – A location in the northwestern part of the town.
- Ketchumville – Another area in the northwestern part of the town, very near to the border with Tioga County.
