= Cornelius P. Rhoads =

American pathologist and oncologist

- Rhoads in 1943
- Born: Cornelius Packard Rhoads; June 20, 1898; Springfield, Massachusetts, U.S.
- Died: August 13, 1959 (aged 61); Stonington, Connecticut, U.S.
- Education: Bowdoin College; Harvard University
- Awards: Legion of Merit; Walker Prize; Clement Cleveland Medal Katherine Berkin Judd Award
- Scientific career
- Fields: Oncology, pathology, hematology
- Workplaces: Rockefeller University; Worcester Foundation for Experimental Biology

Cornelius Packard "Dusty" Rhoads (June 9, 1898 – August 13, 1959) was an American pathologist, oncologist, and hospital administrator who was involved in a racist scandal and subsequent whitewashing in the 1930s. Beginning in 1940, he served as director of Memorial Hospital for Cancer Research in New York, from 1945 was the first director of Sloan-Kettering Institute, and the first director of the combined Memorial Sloan–Kettering Cancer Center. For his contributions to cancer research, Rhoads was featured on the cover of the June 27, 1949, issue of Time magazine under the title "Cancer Fighter".

During his early years with the Rockefeller Institute in the 1930s, Rhoads specialized in anemia and leukemia, working for six months in Puerto Rico in 1932 as part of the Rockefeller Foundation International Health Board contingent. During World War II, he worked for the United States Army helping to develop chemical weapons and set up research centers. Research on mustard gas led to developments for its use in chemotherapy at Sloan Kettering.

In early 1932, a letter Rhoads had written in November 1931, which disparaged Puerto Ricans and makes claims (which he referred to later as jokes) he had intentionally injected cancer cells into his patients, was given by a lab assistant to Puerto Rican nationalist leader Pedro Albizu Campos. He publicized the letter in the Puerto Rican and American media, which led to a scandal, an official investigation, and a whitewashing campaign by US institutions and media. In the ensuing investigation, Rhoads defended himself, saying he had written his comments in anger and as a joke to a New York colleague. Neither Puerto Rico's Attorney General nor the medical community found evidence of Rhoads or the project giving any inappropriate medical treatment, and the scandal was forgotten.

In 2002, the controversy was revived. Alerted to the incident, American Association for Cancer Research (AACR), which had established the Cornelius P. Rhoads Memorial Award in 1979, commissioned a new investigation. It was led by Jay Katz, emeritus professor at Yale Law School and a specialist in medical ethics. He concluded there was no evidence of unethical human experimentation, but the letter was so offensive that the prize should be renamed. AACR concurred and stripped the honor from Rhoads because of his racism.

== Early life and education ==
Rhoads was born June 20, 1898, in Springfield, Massachusetts, as the son of an ophthalmologist, Dr. George H. Rhoads, and his wife. He received his early education in Springfield, later attending Bowdoin College in Maine, where he graduated in 1920. He entered Harvard Medical School, where he became class president, and in 1924, he received his M.D., cum laude. Rhoads became an intern at Peter Bent Brigham Hospital, and contracted pulmonary tuberculosis. During his treatment and recovery, he developed a lifelong interest in disease research.

== Early career ==
After recovering from TB, Rhoads published a paper on the tuberculin reaction with Fred W. Stewart, who became his longtime colleague. Rhoads taught as a pathologist at Harvard and conducted research on disease processes.

In 1929, Rhoads joined the staff of the Rockefeller Institute for Medical Research, now Rockefeller University, where he worked for Simon Flexner. He was also staff pathologist at Rockefeller Hospital. His early research interests included hematology and poliomyelitis. He worked at Rockefeller until 1939.

== Puerto Rico ==
While working for the Rockefeller Institute, in 1931 Rhoads was invited by hematologist William B. Castle to join his Rockefeller Anemia Commission, to conduct clinical research at Presbyterian Hospital in San Juan, Puerto Rico. This was part of the Rockefeller Foundation's sanitary commission on the island through the International Health Division. Castle's research interest was pernicious iron deficiency anemia, specifically as caused by the parasitic hookworm, which was endemic on the island at rates of 80%, and tropical sprue. An effective treatment for the latter had just been developed, although the disease's causes remained obscure. As recently as 2010, these conditions continued to cause high mortality in Puerto Ricans, as reported in the scientific journal Revista de Hematologia. The cause of tropical sprue has still not been identified, but since the 1940s, it can be treated with folic acid and a 3 to 6-month course of antibiotics.

Rhoads was to assist Castle, and they established a base in San Juan at the Presbyterian Hospital. Rhoads corresponded often with Simon Flexner at the Rockefeller Institute in New York regarding his research and career interests. In Puerto Rico, the Rockefeller group had more than 200 patients; historian and ethicist Susan E. Lederer notes that, while referred to as patients, they were primarily clinical subjects whose conditions were studied to advance medical research. Because of the effects of anemia and the suspicion that tropical sprue was related to diet, Rhoads experimentally controlled patients' diets. Lederer notes that in letters from this time, Rhoads referred to his patients as "experimental 'animals'." He wrote: "If they don’t develop something they certainly have the constitutions of oxen." Rhoads sought to experimentally induce the conditions he was studying in his patients rather than simply treat them. If they did develop tropical sprue, he could treat it with liver extract.

Castle wanted to perform a similar study in Cidra, in conjunction with the School of Tropical Medicine, which was doing related research, but this was not approved. Rhoads also collected polio serum samples for his boss Flexner at the Rockefeller Institute, for which he was assisted by contacts at the university.

=== Scandal ===
On 10 November 1931, Rhoads was at a party at a Puerto Rican co-worker's house in Cidra. After having some drinks, he left, and found that his car had been vandalized and several items stolen. He went to his office, where he wrote and signed a letter addressed to "Ferdie" (Fred W. Stewart, a colleague from Boston, by then working at the Memorial Hospital for Cancer Research in New York).

He wrote the following:

Dear Ferdie:

The more I think about the Larry Smith appointment the more disgusted I get. Have you heard any reason advanced for it? It certainly is odd that a man out with the entire Boston group, fired by Wallach, and as far as I know, absolutely devoid of any scientific reputation should be given the place. There is something wrong somewhere with our point of view.

The situation is settled in Boston. Parker and Nye are to run the laboratory together and either Kenneth or MacMahon to be assistant; the chief to stay on. As far as I can see, the chances of my getting a job in the next ten years are absolutely nil. One is certainly not encouraged to make scientific advances, when it is a handicap rather than an aid to advancement. I can get a damn fine job here and am tempted to take it. It would be ideal except for the Porto Ricans [sic]. They are beyond doubt the dirtiest, laziest, most degenerate and thievish race of men ever inhabiting this sphere. It makes you sick to inhabit the same island with them. They are even lower than Italians. What the island needs is not public health work but a tidal wave or something to totally exterminate the population. It might then be livable. I have done my best to further the process of extermination by killing off 8 and transplanting cancer into several more. The latter has not resulted in any fatalities so far... The matter of consideration for the patients' welfare plays no role here — in fact all physicians take delight in the abuse and torture of the unfortunate subjects.

Do let me know if you hear any more news.

Sincerely, "Dusty"

His unmailed letter was found by one of his staff and circulated among workers at the Anemia Commission. When Rhoads learned of this, he quickly made a public apology at a meeting of all staff and doctors. A while later, he was dismayed to hear that the letter was going to be discussed at a meeting of the Puerto Rico Medical Association. With relations having deteriorated locally, he returned to New York in December 1931.

=== Publicity and investigations ===
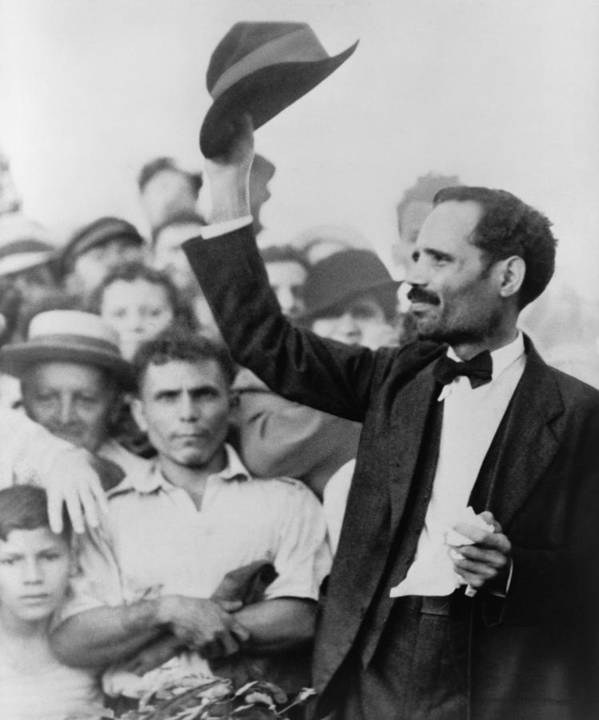
Pedro Albizu Campos, Puerto Rican nationalist

At the end of December, Rhoads' former lab technician Luis Baldoni resigned; he later testified that he feared for his safety. In January 1932 he gave the Rhoads letter to Pedro Albizu Campos, president of the Puerto Rican Nationalist Party. Albizu Campos sought publicity about the incident, sending copies of the letter to the League of Nations, the Pan American Union, the American Civil Liberties Union, newspapers, embassies, and the Vatican.

In addition to distributing the letter to the media, Albizu wrote his own, charging that Rhoads was part of a US plot to exterminate Puerto Ricans. He linked the letter to other complaints about American imperialism, saying that the US governors in Puerto Rico encouraged labor emigration rather than improving employment, and promoted birth control, which was offensive to the majority Catholic residents.

A photograph of the Rhoads' letter was published on January 27, 1932 in La Democracia, the Unionist newspaper of Antonio Rafael Barceló, with a translation in Spanish of the entire letter. It did not support Albizu Campos' theory of a US conspiracy against Puerto Rico. On February 13, El Mundo published the entire letter, in both Spanish and English.

The Rhoads' letter created one of the first crises for James R. Beverley, newly appointed as the acting Governor of Puerto Rico. He said the letter was a "confession of murder" and "a libel against the people of Puerto Rico", and ordered an investigation, one of his first acts. Beverley said of Rhoads that "he was just a damned fool, ... a good doctor, but not very strong mentally on anything else." Rhoads, already back in New York, released an official response to the media and the governor. He insisted that he was joking in his letter, which was intended to be confidential, calling it a "fantastic and playful composition written entirely for my own diversion and intended as a parody on supposed attitudes of some American minds in Porto Rico," explaining that nothing "was ever intended to mean other than the opposite of what was stated." Rhoads offered to return to clear things up, but never did. The governor's inquiry concluded that Rhoads did not commit the acts included in his letter, nor any other crimes. Later that year, Governor Beverley struggled with a greater political crisis than the Rhoads letter over his own remarks encouraging birth control use on the island. Residents were outraged and he was removed from office.

Rhoads and his work were investigated by the Puerto Rican Attorney General Ramon Quinones, with review of medical aspects by Dr. P. Morales Otero, representative of the Puerto Rico Medical Association, and Dr. E. Garrido Morales, representing the Commissioner of Health. Sworn testimony was taken from several of Rhoads' patients as well as his colleagues, including Castle, William Galbreath, and George C. Payne. They reviewed the case files for the 257 patients treated by Rhoads and the Rockefeller Commission, including the 13 patients who died during this period. They found no evidence of the crimes described in Rhoads' unmailed letter. The Attorney General and medical community joined in absolving Rhoads of the Nationalist charges that he was part of a U.S. plot to exterminate Puerto Ricans. Rhoads was subject to separate investigations ordered by the acting American governor of Puerto Rico, Beverley, and the Rockefeller Institute, and "neither...was able to uncover any evidence that Dr. Rhoads had exterminated any Puerto Ricans."

Confirmed in Lederer's 21st century account, "records at Presbyterian Hospital in San Juan, Puerto Rico, where Rhoads had performed his research, revealed no patients in the young pathologist's care had died under suspicious circumstances." Additionally, the investigators were "unable to confirm Rhoads's other claim (omitted in Time's account) that he had 'transplanted cancer into several patients.'"

During the investigations, Ivy Lee, who handled public relations for the Rockefeller family, and a team at the Institute began a campaign to defend Rhoads' reputation. He was seen as a promising researcher. The Rockefeller Foundation also wanted to protect its working relationship with medical organizations in Puerto Rico and avoid problems with critics of human experimentation in the U.S. During the early 1930s, there was a revival of the anti-vivisectionist movement in the U.S., which also was concerned about the use of vulnerable populations as human subjects of experimentation: children (especially orphans), prisoners, and soldiers. As Lederer observed, "some members of the medical community...monitored the popular and medical press." Francis Peyton Rous of the Rockefeller Institute was editor of the Journal of Experimental Medicine through the 1930s and 1940s. Although it accepted few articles on clinical research, he was careful about their wording in an effort to avoid criticism by the anti-vivisectionists.

Lee was given access to pre-published versions of the articles on the controversy by both The New York Times and Time. He persuaded Time to eliminate the words "and transplanting cancer into several more," from its published version of the letter. Also, based on the positive testimony of some patients, The New York Times headlined its article as "Patients Say Rhoads Saved Their Lives" and reported on this aspect as well. Rhoads had returned to New York before the scandal broke in Puerto Rico. After the Attorney General's report and that of the Rockefeller Institute in 1932, the controversy quickly faded in the United States.

Reaction to the Rhoads scandal and controversy was mixed in the United States, in part due to the Rockefeller campaign. Starr says (in his 2003 article on the scandal) that Rhoads' colleagues did not believe the researcher's attempt to cast his letter as a "fantastic and playful composition...intended as a parody." Some were worried about Rhoads' mental health at the time. A superior dismissed the incident as a case of local ingratitude. Time magazine headlined the incident as "Porto Ricochet"; Starr suggests they meant that Rhoads's humanitarian work in Puerto Rico had come back to bite him.

In Puerto Rico, Albizu Campos used the Rhoads scandal as part of his anti-colonial campaign, attracting followers to the Nationalist Party. In 1950, longtime Puerto Rican pro-independence activists Oscar Collazo and Griselio Torresola tried to assassinate President Truman to bring their cause to the world stage. When later interviewed, Collazo said that as a young man, in 1932 he heard Albizu Campos speak about the Rhoads letter and decided to devote his life to the Nationalist movement.

== Hematology ==
Following his study in Puerto Rico, in 1933 Rhoads was chosen to lead a special service at the Rockefeller Institute in clinical hematology, to study diseases of the blood-forming organs. He built on his research on anemia and tropical sprue. In 1934, Rhoads and another researcher published results of the success in using liver extract therapy to treat tropical sprue (and relieve anemia). Their work was recognized as contributing benefit in treatment of the disease by others in the field.

== Memorial Hospital and World War II ==
In 1940, Rhoads was selected as director of Memorial Hospital, which was devoted to cancer care and research, and had recently moved into a new building. Rhoads was selected for his interest in clinical investigation in addition to laboratory research, as the hospital did research as well as treatment. He succeeded James Ewing, a noted oncologist. Ewing had written about cancer transplantation in 1931, a subject which Rhoads had referred to in his scandalous letter written in November of that year. In 1941 Rhoads was studying the use of radiation to treat leukemia.

During World War II, Rhoads was commissioned as a colonel and assigned as chief of medicine in the Chemical Weapons Division of the U.S. Army. He established the U.S. Army chemical weapons laboratories in Utah, Maryland, and Panama. With his enthusiastic participation, secret experiments including race-based tests involving African Americans, Japanese Americans, and Puerto Ricans were performed on more than 60,000 U.S. soldiers. Many were left suffering from debilitating, lifelong aftereffects. For this work, he won the Legion of Merit for "combating poison gas and other advances in chemical warfare" in 1945. In 2003, the chemical warfare experiments conducted at San Jose Island were also reviewed as a part of the investigation into Rhoads' actions in Puerto Rico. Yale bioethicist Jay Katz described the chemical warfare tests as "unconscionable," saying that they were based on the "cheap availability of human beings" and the soldiers were "manipulated, exploited, and betrayed."

Due to his casualty studies on mustard gas from an accident during the war in Italy, Rhoads became interested in its potential for cancer treatment. For the rest of his life, his research interest was in developing chemotherapy for cancer treatment, but he served primarily as an administrator and scientific director at Memorial and Sloan-Kettering. From studies of mustard gas, he developed a drug called mechlorethamine or Mustargen. Its success in clinical trials during the war years was the basis for the development of the field of anti-cancer chemotherapy. Rhoads also became interested in total body irradiation, which led to early work on chemotherapy.

== Post-war ==
In 1945, the Sloan-Kettering Institute was founded as a cancer research center, in the hopes that an industrial approach to research would yield a cure. It opened in 1948. While still director of Memorial, from 1945 until 1953 Rhoads also served as the first director of the Sloan-Kettering Institute. He was "praised by Memorial for his 'essential role in the evolution of the hospital into a modern medical center.'" As director of Sloan-Kettering, he had oversight as well over research related to Department of Defense radiation experiments through 1954. For instance, that year, a Sloan-Kettering team began a multi-year study of "Post-Irradiation Syndrome in Humans."

In 1953, Rhoads stepped back slightly, becoming scientific director of the newly merged Memorial Sloan–Kettering Cancer Center. He also continued as the scientific director of Sloan-Kettering operations. He also was an adviser to the United States Atomic Energy Commission regarding nuclear medicine. Some AEC funding supported Sloan-Kettering research into the use of iodine to transport radiation to cancer tumors.

Rhoads continued to serve as scientific director of the Memorial Sloan–Kettering Cancer Center until his death. He died of a coronary occlusion on August 13, 1959, in Stonington, Connecticut. In 1979, on the 20th anniversary of his death, the American Association for Cancer Research established the Cornelius P. Rhoads Memorial Prize in his honor, as an annual award to a promising young researcher.

== Honors ==
- Legion of Merit in 1945 for Rhoads' work for the US Army during WWII.
- Trustee of the Charles Kettering Foundation.
- Awarded three honorary doctorates, two for science and one for law.
- Posthumously awarded the Katherine Berkin Judd Award for outstanding contributions to oncology research.
- The American Association for Cancer Research (AACR) established the Cornelius P. Rhoads Memorial Award posthumously in his honor in 1979.(In 2002, it renamed the award due to Rhoads' racism expressed in his 1932 letter.)

== Revival of controversy ==
In 1982, Puerto Rican social scientist and writer Pedro Aponte-Vázquez discovered new information at various archives which raised questions about the investigations conducted on Rhoads and Rockefeller Project. Most prominent among his findings was a 1932 letter written by Governor Beverly to the associate director of the Rockefeller Foundation, stating that Rhoads had written a second letter "even worse than the first" and which, according to Beverley, the [Puerto Rican] government had suppressed and destroyed. In 1932 the Puerto Rican Attorney General, aided by top-ranking Puerto Rican doctors, had investigated all of the work of Rhoads and the Rockefeller Project, including 13 deaths that occurred among nearly 300 patients treated. They found no evidence of wrongdoing or crimes. In addition, Rhoads' superior at the Rockefeller Project had conducted a close investigation of the 13 patients who died under Rhoads' tenure, but found no evidence of wrongdoing. But in 1982 Aponte-Vázquez urged the Puerto Rico Department of Justice to reopen the case. It refused as Rhoads had been dead for so long.

In 2002, Edwin Vazquez, a biology professor at the University of Puerto Rico, came across Rhoads' 1932 letter and contacted the American Association for Cancer Research (AACR) about it. Given the letter's offensive nature, he demanded that Rhoads' name be removed from the AACR award. Others also contacted the AACR, including Puerto Rico's Secretary of State Ferdinand Mercado. Revival of the issue generated a fresh wave of publicity. The AACR, which said it had not known of the 1932 controversy, commissioned an investigation led by Jay Katz, a bioethicist from Yale University. Katz said although "there was no evidence of Dr. Rhoads' killing patients or transplanting cancer cells, the letter itself was reprehensible enough to remove his name from the award." The AACR agreed with his conclusion.

Eric Rosenthal of Oncology Times in 2003 characterized the case as the AACR having to "deal with the embarrassment of having history catch up to modern-day sensibilities." He wrote,

The complicated legacy of Cornelius "Dusty" Rhoads, who died in 1959, should not cause society to promote nor deny his existence but should provide a perspective that neither condones what he wrote or thought—or the whitewashing of the incident by institutions and media of the 1930s—but that does give him due appropriate credit for his accomplishments as well as acknowledgement of his faults and sins."

In 2003 the AACR renamed the award, stripping the honor from Rhoads posthumously, to the Award for Outstanding Achievement in Cancer Research. The AACR indicated that the new name would be retroactive and past awardees would receive updated plaques.

== Representation in other media ==
- During the 1980s, the Puerto Rican political satire comedy group, Los Rayos Gamma, performed parodies of Rhoads with Jacobo Morales portraying a Cornelio Rodas as an insane, Frankenstein-like scientist bent on the elimination of Puerto Ricans.
- Roberto Busó-García wrote and directed the dramatic film, The Condemned (2013), which he said was loosely based on the Rhoads' controversy in Puerto Rico.
