= Burtersett =

Village in North Yorkshire, England

Coordinates: 54.2986°N 2.16934°W

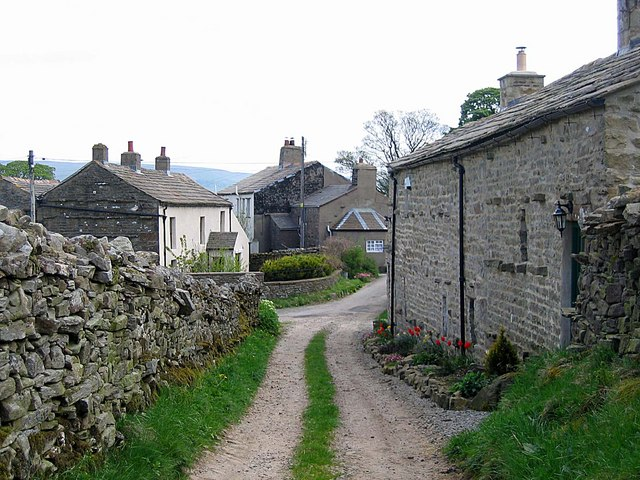
- Shaw Lane, Burtersett

- Location within North Yorkshire
- OS grid reference: SD890892
  - London: 210 mi (340 km) SE
- Unitary authority: North Yorkshire
- Ceremonial county: North Yorkshire
- Region: Yorkshire and the Humber
- Country: England
- Sovereign state: United Kingdom
- Police: North Yorkshire
- Fire: North Yorkshire
- Ambulance: Yorkshire

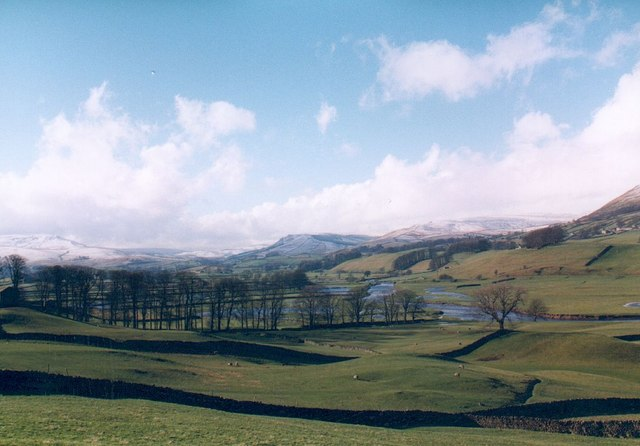
The River Ure in Wensleydale, near Burtersett, breaks its banks during floods in 1994

Burtersett is a small village in Wensleydale, in the Yorkshire Dales, North Yorkshire, England. It lies approximately 1 mile (1.6 km) east from Hawes and Gayle. The village is known for its former quarrying industry and being the seat of the Hillary family.

== History ==
Whilst the village is not mentioned in the Domesday Book, its name is recorded as far back as 1280 as Beutresate. The village has also been called Birtresatte and Butterside, with the derivation being Shieling near the alder tree. It is known that the area surrounding Burtersett was a royal forest during the reign of Edward I, but gradually the local industry gave way to sheep farming, then later quarrying and dairy produce.

=== Industry ===
Quarrying on the moor south of the village reached a peak in 1890, when two stone slate quarries were in operation; Burtersett and Seavy. Although the men referred to themselves as quarrymen, both sites were actually mines which operated 2-foot-3-inch (0.69 m) gauge tramways to transport the stone into the village. The stone was called slate, but it was a sandstone, typically used as a flagstone, but thicker beds were used as a building stone in the area. When the Wensleydale Railway arrived in Hawes, the quarries were exporting 15,000 tonnes (17,000 tons) per month via the railway station.

Other industries included knitted products and candles. The candle factory, a four-story building, still exists today, but the operation is believed to have stopped in the early 20th century.

=== Hillary Hall ===
The grade II listed building known as Hillary Hall was built in the late seventeenth century to early eighteenth century, with early-to-mid-eighteenth and nineteenth century alterations. It was bought by John Hillary of Birkrigg around 1699, and was the childhood home of his son William Hillary (1697–1763), a physician who was known for his work on tropical diseases. John and his wife made the house grander, including a moulded doorway with "1729" engraved on the keystone. Hillary Hall passed to William's brother Richard Hillary, a merchant, who had been born in the house. It was sold in the early nineteenth century by Richard's son William Hillary, to cover the costs of the First Essex Legion, which he had raised to fight in the Napoleonic Wars; he later went on to found the Royal National Lifeboat Institution. (Note: Local historian Harry Speight claimed it was "formerly the seat of Sir Henry Hillary, a large landowner in upper Wensleydale", but there is no evidence of a Sir Henry Hillary of Wensleydale.)

== Governance ==
Historically, Burtersett was in the Parish of Aysgarth and the wapentake of Hang West. Whilst it now belongs in the civil parish of Hawes which it is nearer, Aysgarth was the largest settlement around until the Richmond to Lancaster Turnpike was diverted off Cam High Road (south of Burtersett) to go through Hawes and over Widdale.

== See also ==
- Listed buildings in Hawes
