= School of Tropical Medicine =

School of Tropical Medicine may refer to:

- Calcutta School of Tropical Medicine (in Calcutta, India)

United Kingdom:

- Liverpool School of Tropical Medicine
- London School of Tropical Medicine (since renamed as the London School of Hygiene & Tropical Medicine)

USA and its possessions:

- Harvard School of Tropical Medicine (part of Harvard University)
- School of Tropical Medicine (Puerto Rico) (since affiliated as the School of Medicine of the University of Puerto Rico)
- Tulane University School of Public Health and Tropical Medicine
