= George C. Payne =

American tropical physician

George C. Payne (also known as G.C. Payne) was an American tropical physician and director for the International Health Board of the Rockefeller Foundation for Mexico and Trinidad in the 1920s. He also worked as a physician for the state health board in Virginia in 1923. As part of the Rockefeller Foundation’s International Health Board activities, Payne participated in large-scale anti-hookworm campaigns that combined epidemiological surveys, treatment programs, and sanitation measures in collaboration with local authorities in the Caribbean and Latin America. He investigated hookworm disease between 1921 and 1934, conducting epidemiological studies of infected communities and long-term evaluations of areas influenced by hookworm control measures.

He was known for studying the links between hookworm, tropical sprue and anemia in Trinidad as well as Puerto Rico at the School of Tropical Medicine, where he worked with William Bosworth Castle and Cornelius P. Rhoads. This research contributed to contemporary debates about nutritional deficiency, parasitic infection, and anemia in tropical medicine.

In 1929 he published a study on effective footwear to reduce worm infestation, demonstrating experimentally that infective hookworm larvae could penetrate certain shoe materials.

He became involved in the Rhoads scandal of the 1930s, a controversy later analyzed in historical scholarship on colonial medicine and medical ethics. He was the first to use a type of mosquito bait trap or stable trap in 1923 in the West Indies, a method later discussed in entomological comparisons of trapping techniques in Puerto Rico. He also studied diet and nutrition in Mexico from 1944 to 1948.
