= Castle factors =

Castle (gastric) factors, named after the American physician and physiologist W. B. Castle, are biologically active chemical compounds which stimulate haematopoiesis (formation of blood cellular components). There are two distinct factors:

- Extrinsic factor, much more commonly known as vitamin B_{12}
- Intrinsic factor, a glycoprotein produced by the parietal cells of the stomach, which is necessary for the absorption of vitamin B_{12}
