= School of Tropical Medicine (Puerto Rico) =

Historic place in San Juan, Puerto Rico

- U.S. National Register of Historic Places
- U.S. Historic district – Contributing property
- Puerto Rico Historic Sites and Zones
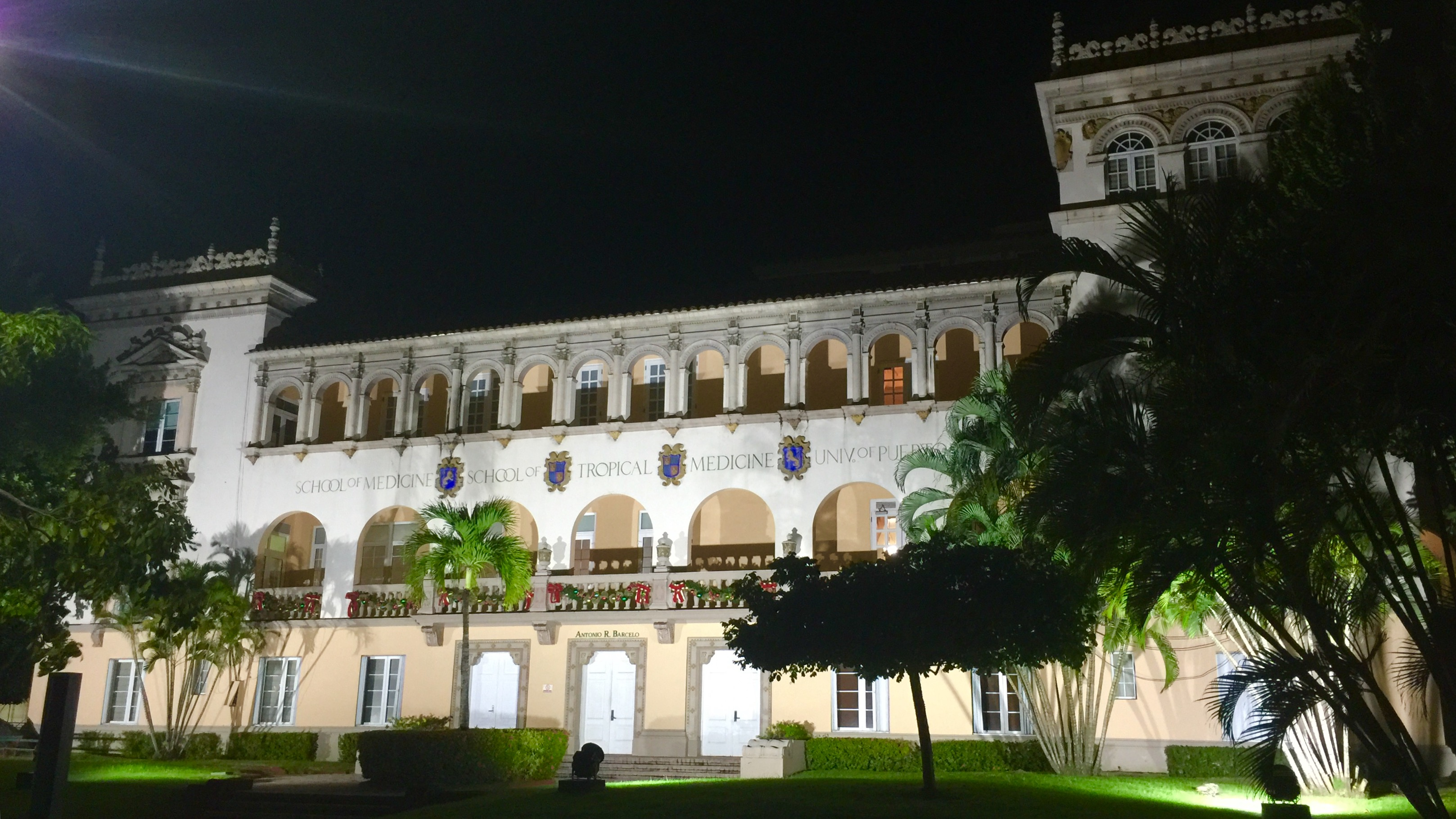
- School of Tropical Medicine - Univ. of Puerto Rico

- Location within Puerto Rico
- Location: Ponce de León Ave, Barrio Puerto de Tierra, San Juan, Puerto Rico
- Coordinates: 18°28′01″N 66°06′14″W
- Area: 3.9 acres (1.6 ha)
- Built: 1926
- Architect: Rafael Carmoega
- Architectural style: Neo-Plateresque
- Part of: Puerta de Tierra Historic District (ID100002936)
- NRHP reference No.: 83002297
- RNSZH No.: 2000-(RMSJ)-00-JP-SH

Significant dates
- Added to NRHP: September 29, 1983
- Designated CP: October 15, 2019
- Designated RNSZH: February 3, 2000

The School of Tropical Medicine (Spanish: Escuela de Medicina Tropical), was an educational institution created in 1926 by an act of the Puerto Rican Legislature, to further the research initiated by the Anemia Commissions and the Institute of Tropical Medicine on anemia and its causes. The institution existed as an independent entity until 1949, when it was integrated into the School of Medicine of the University of Puerto Rico.

== History ==
=== Puerto Rico Anemia Commission ===
Captain Bailey K. Ashford, a medical doctor, was a member of the United States Army Medical Corps which accompanied the United States Army when Puerto Rico was invaded during the Spanish–American War in 1898. As the medical officer in the general military hospital in Ponce, he was the first to describe and successfully treat North American hookworm in 1899.

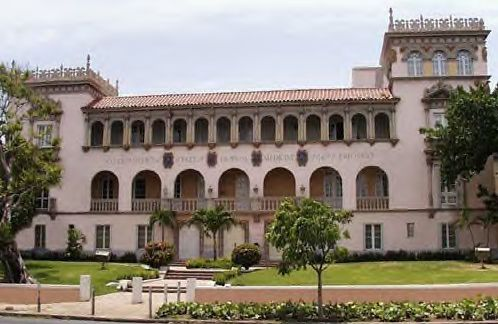
School of Tropical Medicine building

Because of his clinical investigations into the anemia caused by hookworm infestation, Ashford was inspired to organize and conduct a parasite treatment campaign. It cured approximately 300,000 persons (one-third of the Puerto Rico population) and reduced the death rate from this anemia by 90 percent.

Ashford and Dr. Isaac González Martínez encouraged the government to undertake a program to reduce hookworm and anemia. They were appointed as the founding members of the Puerto Rico Anemia Commission, established in 1904 by the Insular Government. Ashford had discovered that hookworm infestation was the principal cause of anemia on the island. He served on the Commission from 1904–1906. Medical research in Puerto Rico had its beginning with the "First Anemia Commission."

In 1911, Ashford together with doctors Isaac Gonzalez Martinez, Pedro Gutiérrez Igaravides and Walter King, proposed that the local government create an Institute of Tropical Medicine to further the research initiated by the Anemia Commissions. In 1912, the local legislature approved the proposal and established the Institute of Tropical Medicine.

=== School of Tropical Medicine ===
The President of the Puerto Rico Senate, Antonio R. Barceló, was attending a conference in New York City when he was approached by professors Jose Antonio Lopez Antongiorgi and Abraham L. Goodman from the Medical School of Columbia University. They spoke about the need for establishing a medical school in Puerto Rico where scientific investigations could be conducted into tropical diseases. Senator Barceló became interested in the idea and, on June 23, 1924, he sponsored the legislation which provided Governor Horace Towner, with the prerequisite funding for the school.

The School of Tropical Medicine was formally dedicated in 1925. It was the second school in the United States and its territories (after Tulane's School of Tropical Medicine, 1913), founded for the purpose of researching and training physicians in the cause and prevention of tropical diseases. Located in Puerta de Tierra, San Juan, the school's building is one of the few examples of the Neo-Plateresque architectural style on the Island. In 1926, new legislation expanded the Institute of Tropical Medicine into the School of Tropical Medicine of the University of Puerto Rico, which was operated under the sponsorship of Columbia University. An agreement was made between the University of Puerto Rico and Columbia University in regard to the finances of the institution.

Having completed a 30-year Army career, Ashford assumed a full-time faculty position at the school and continued his interest in tropical medicine. Together with doctors Isaac González Martínez and Ramón M. Suárez Calderon, he continued his research and study of anemia.

González Martínez conducted many investigations and experiments in parasitology, bilharzia, leprosy and typhoid fever. During his years at the institution, González Martínez founded Anales de Medicina de Puerto Rico, a scientific journal. He was elected president of the Medical Academy of Puerto Rico in 1917. In 1919, he published a chapter on his findings of the Intestinal Bilharzias in the book La Práctica de la Medicina en el Trópico.

Suárez Calderon identified the proper and effective treatment of a type of anemia known as tropical sprue, the application of complex methods, such as electrocardiography and radioisotope, to be used in clinics and the identification and treatment of the disease which causes heart rheumatism. Suárez Calderon continued Ashford's work and investigations on anemia after the latter's death. In 1938, he published his scientific findings on tropical sprue.

In 1927, the institution offered courses in tropical medicine and nutrition. Most of the students continued their graduate work at Columbia University. In May 1930, the University of Puerto Rico offered two degrees of Master of Arts for the students who continued their education and work at the School of Tropical Medicine.

In 1931, William B. Castle and his assistant Cornelius P. Rhoads studied hookworm and tropical sprue in relation to anemia. They were able to treat some patients with liver extract, which efficacy was being studied. Dr. George C. Payne continued to study anemia in 1936 and 1937.

=== UPR School of Medicine ===
The agreement between the University of Puerto Rico and Columbia University in regard to the School of Tropical Medicine was terminated by mutual consent in 1948.

In May 1949, the Puerto Rican Legislature authorized the creation of the School of Medicine of the University of Puerto Rico, also known as the UPR School of Medicine. The School of Tropical Medicine was merged into the new school, and admitted its first class in August 1950. On September 29, 1983, the building in which the School of Tropical Medicine was located was listed in the National Register of Historic Places. It was later added to the Puerto Rico Register of Historic Sites and Zones in 2000.

== See also ==
- National Register of Historic Places listings in San Juan, Puerto Rico
- University of Puerto Rico
- University of Puerto Rico, Medical Sciences Campus
