= Charles Erwin Wilson =

5th US Secretary of Defense (1890–1961)

Charles Wilson
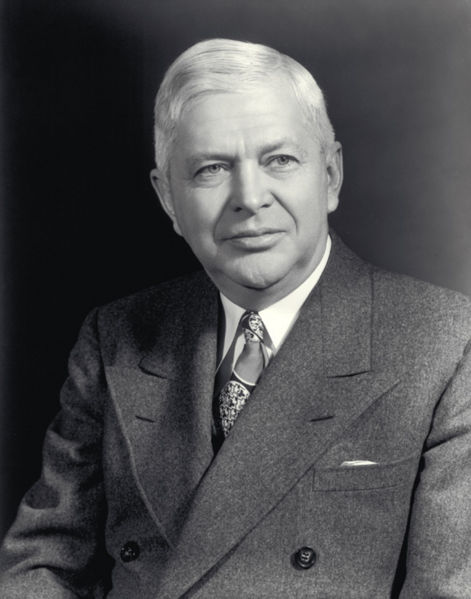
- Wilson c. 1948

5th United States Secretary of Defense
- In office January 28, 1953 – October 8, 1957
- President: Dwight D. Eisenhower
- Preceded by: Robert A. Lovett
- Succeeded by: Neil H. McElroy

Personal details
- Born: July 18, 1890 Minerva, Ohio, U.S.
- Died: September 26, 1961 (aged 71) Norwood, Louisiana, U.S.
- Party: Republican
- Spouse: Jessie Curtis
- Education: Carnegie Mellon University (BS)

Charles Erwin Wilson (July 18, 1890 – September 26, 1961) was an American engineer and businessman who served as United States Secretary of Defense from 1953 to 1957 under President Dwight D. Eisenhower. Known as "Engine Charlie", he was previously the president and chief executive officer of General Motors. In the wake of the Korean War, he cut the defense budget significantly.

== Early life and career ==
Wilson was born in Minerva, Ohio, the son of Thomas E. and Rosalind (née Unkefer) Wilson. After earning a degree in electrical engineering from the Carnegie Institute of Technology in 1909, he joined the Westinghouse Electric Company in Pittsburgh, where eventually he supervised the engineering of automobile electrical equipment, and during World War I, the development of dynamotors and radio generators for the Army and Navy. Wilson married Jessie Ann Curtis on September 11, 1912. They had six children: Thomas, Edward, Erwin, Lucille, Rosemary and Jeanne.

== General Motors career ==
In 1919, Wilson became chief engineer and sales manager of Remy Electric, a General Motors subsidiary. By January 1941 he was the president of General Motors. During World War II, Wilson directed the company's huge defense production effort, which earned him a Medal for Merit in 1946. He was still the CEO of General Motors when Eisenhower selected him as Secretary of Defense in January 1953.

== Secretary of Defense ==
=== Confirmation ===
Wilson's nomination sparked a controversy that erupted during his confirmation hearings before the Senate Armed Services Committee, based on his large share ownership in General Motors. Reluctant to sell the stock, valued at the time at more than $2.5 million (or about $24 million in 2018), Wilson agreed to do so under committee pressure. During the hearings, when asked if he could make a decision as Secretary of Defense that would be adverse to the interests of General Motors, Wilson answered affirmatively. But he added that he could not conceive of such a situation "because for years I thought what was good for our country was good for General Motors, and vice versa." That statement has frequently been misquoted as "What's good for General Motors is good for the country." Although Wilson tried for years to correct the misquote, he was reported at the time of his retirement in 1957 to have accepted the popular impression.

Wilson was finally confirmed as Secretary of Defense by a Senate vote of 77 to 6 and began his duties in the Pentagon.

=== Tenure ===
Both Wilson and Eisenhower entered office committed to reorganizing the US Department of Defense. They succeeded in securing from Congress approval in June 1953 of Reorganization Plan No. 6, which made changes in OSD, the Joint Chiefs of Staff, and the chain of command. Wilson welcomed the reorganization plan, which became effective on June 30, 1953, as facilitating more efficient management of the Department of Defense. He considered the assistant secretaries as his "vice presidents" and tried to manage the Pentagon like an industrial corporation. Wilson took advantage of the reorganization to decentralize administration, giving the service secretaries more responsibility and importance. In his first annual report, he noted that the service secretaries were his principal assistants; decentralizing operational responsibility to them would make for effective exercise of civilian authority throughout the Department of Defense. In July 1954, to complement the 1953 reorganization, Wilson issued a directive to the JCS, the most important provision of which stated that "the Joint Staff work of each of the Chiefs of Staff shall take priority over all other duties," their tasks as chiefs of individual services. The directive also clarified the role of the JCS chairman and his authority over the Joint Staff while making clear that assignment of major tasks to the Joint Staff was the prerogative of the full JCS.

Internal reorganization was only one of several major changes during Wilson's tenure, the most important being the "New Look" defense concept. Eisenhower had criticized Truman's policies during the 1952 campaign, arguing that they were reactive rather than positive and that they forced the United States to compete with the Soviet Union on the latter's terms. Eisenhower entered office with strong convictions about the need to reorient the nation's security policy by maintaining a staunch defense while decreasing government expenditures and balancing the budget.

The president inaugurated planning for the New Look in July 1953 by asking the incoming members of the JCS (Admiral Arthur W. Radford, chairman; General Matthew B. Ridgway, Army chief of staff; General Nathan F. Twining, Air Force chief of staff; and Admiral Robert B. Carney, chief of naval operations) to prepare a paper on overall defense policy. Although the JCS paper did not recommend any fundamental changes, the National Security Council in October 1953 adopted a key tenet of the New Look that a large-scale limited war or a general war would likely be fought with nuclear weapons. Eisenhower formally presented the New Look in his State of the Union message in January 1954, and Wilson helped to explain it. More defense for less money was possible, he said (or as he sometimes phrased it, "More bang for the buck"). With new weapons and techniques and ready reserves of troops and material, the United States could support capable military forces within budget allocations that Congress was willing to provide.

The major features of the New Look included greater reliance on nuclear weapons, using the advantage the United States had over the Soviet Union in such weapons; elevation of strategic air power, the major means to deliver nuclear weapons, to a more important position (not an expansion in the number of Air Force aircraft but rather development and production of better equipment); reductions of conventional ground forces, based both on reliance on strategic and tactical nuclear weapons and the expectation that US allies would provide ground troops for their own defense; an expanded program of continental defense, which, along with strategic air power, would serve as a principal ingredient of the New Look's deterrence program; and modernization and enlargement of reserve forces, enhancing the military manpower base while reducing active duty forces.

Although the Eisenhower administration generally adhered to the New Look throughout Wilson's term, the policy remained controversial. Some critics maintained that it made impossible the fighting of a limited non-nuclear war. The Army and the Navy felt that the increased emphasis on air power and nuclear weapons represented a repudiation the concept of "balanced forces" in which individual service programs were balanced against overall requirements. Implicit in the policy was rejection of the idea that a general war or a crisis with the USSR was imminent (to occur when the Soviets achieved offensive nuclear capability against the United States). Wilson pointed out frequently that defense policy should be long-term and not based on short-term projections of Soviet-American relations. "Military expenditures," he observed, "must be adequate, but not so great that they will become an intolerable burden which will harm the social and economic fabric of our country. True security cannot be founded on arms and arms alone."

Wilson worked hard to reduce the defense budget, which meant some immediate cutbacks in fiscal year 1953 funds and a concerted effort to economize in subsequent years. Total obligational authority approved by Congress during Wilson's tenure decreased significantly at first and then began to creep back up, but it remained lower than the Truman administration's last budgets, inflated because of the Korean War. The TOA for FY 1953, Truman's final Defense budget, was $44.2 billion. TOA in subsequent fiscal years was: 1954, $30.4 billion; 1955, $33.7 billion; 1956, $33.06 billion; 1957, $39.7 billion; and 1958, $41.1 billion. Especially after 1954, when the Democratic Party regained control of Congress, the Wilson-Eisenhower effort to curb defense expenditures provoked growing criticism. The Air Force, even though the New Look enhanced its role, opposed the decision to cut back from the Truman goal of 143 wings, and its congressional supporters tried repeatedly, sometimes successfully, to appropriate more money for air power than the administration wanted. The other services, especially the Army, objected to force reductions ordained by the New Look. Both General Ridgway, who retired as Army chief of staff in June 1955, and his successor, General Maxwell D. Taylor, believed that the Army was receiving too small a share of the military budget.

Its standing threatened by the New Look, the Army questioned the wisdom of reliance on "massive retaliation" and strategic air power to the neglect of other force elements. Wilson reportedly observed that the United States "can't afford to fight limited wars. We can only afford to fight a big war, and if there is one, that is the kind it will be." However, by 1955 the Army and, later that decade, the Navy, departed from their emphasis on preparation for total war by urging the need to prepare for limited war, non-global conflicts restricted in geographical area, force size, and weapons although tactical nuclear weapons were not ruled out. Generals Ridgway and Taylor stressed the need to have a variety of forces available and equipped to fight different kinds of war from a local non-nuclear war to a global strategic nuclear conflict. They rejected the notion that limited wars would occur only in less-developed areas and argued that such conflicts might occur in NATO as well.

The Army received indirect support from such critics of massive retaliation as Bernard Brodie, William W. Kaufmann, and Henry A. Kissinger, who noted that the United States and the Soviet Union had or were acquiring the power to destroy each other with strategic nuclear weapons, thus precluding their rational use in response to a limited attack. Taylor, concluding that the Soviet Union and the United States had achieved mutual nuclear deterrence, believed that limited-war forces would play an active role in future conflicts and that atomic retaliatory forces would play a passive role. The Army moved into missile and space programs in an effort to preserve for itself a part in planning for and fighting a nuclear war, but in the late 1950s, it continued to push for adoption of a new national security policy acknowledging the primacy of limited war. While the Eisenhower administration did not adopt the Army's position, by the time that Wilson left office, it had accepted both the need to prepare for limited war and the idea that deterrence of a direct attack on US interests required "sufficient," rather than "superior," retaliatory capability.

Increased competition among the services resulting from the New Look compelled Wilson to deal with the perennially troublesome question of service roles and missions, complicated by the introduction of new weapons, especially missiles. He noted in his semi-annual report at the end of FY 1956 that the services, which had eight categories of guided missiles available for various tasks, could not agree on their respective roles and missions in relation to these and other planned missile systems. Also at issue were aircraft types for the individual services and Air Force tactical support for the Army. To address those and other nagging questions, Wilson issued two important documents. The former, a memorandum to members of the Armed Forces Policy Council on November 26, 1956, dealt with five points of contention. First, Wilson limited the Army to small aircraft with specifically defined functions within combat zones. On the matter of airlift adequacy, which the Army questioned, the secretary declared current Air Force practices acceptable. As to air defense, the Army received responsibility for point defense of specified geographical areas, vital installations, and cities; the Air Force became responsible for area defense and the interception of enemy attacks away from individual vital installations; and the Navy could maintain ship-based air defense weapon systems. Wilson assigned to the Air Force primary responsibility for tactical support for the Army, although the Army could use surface-to-surface missiles for close support of its field operations. Finally, the secretary gave the Air Force sole authority to operate land-based intermediate-range ballistic missile (IRBM) systems and the Navy the same responsibility for ship-based IRBMs. He enjoined the Army from planning operational employment of missiles with ranges beyond 200 miles (320 km).

On March 18, 1957, Wilson issued a directive to clarify his earlier decisions on the Army-Air Force use of aircraft for tactical purposes. He made no major changes from the previous division of responsibility but provided a more detailed and specific listing of those functional areas for which the Army could procure its own aircraft and those for which it would rely on the Air Force.

Although Wilson found it necessary to clarify service roles and missions, he did not press for extensive further unification of the armed forces. He established in February 1956 an office of special assistant to the Secretary of Defense for guided missiles but made few other changes after implementation of Reorganization Plan No. 6 in 1953. When asked in 1957 about persistent demands for further unification, Wilson responded, "It's an oversimplification in the false hope that you could thus wash out the problems if you put the people all in the same uniform and that then they wouldn't disagree over what should be done. Of course, they would."

Wilson, a folksy, honest, and outspoken man, sometimes got into trouble because of casual remarks. In January 1957, for example, he referred to enlistees in the National Guard during the Korean War as "draft dodgers." That caused a storm of protest and even brought a rebuke from Eisenhower, who said he thought Wilson had made "a very... unwise statement, without stopping to think what it meant." On another occasion, Wilson jokingly referred to the White House as a "dung hill," generating further controversy.

Wilson indicated his intention to retire from office shortly after the start of the second Eisenhower term and left on October 8, 1957. Eisenhower noted when Wilson stepped down that under him, "the strength of our security forces has not only been maintained but has been significantly increased" and that he had managed the Defense Department "in a manner consistent with the requirements of a strong, healthy national economy."

On October 9, 1957, Eisenhower presented Wilson with the Medal of Freedom.

=== Regulation of human experimentation ===
While serving as Secretary of Defense, Wilson enacted stronger rules against human medical experimentation. The 1953 Wilson Memo led the armed services to adopt the Nuremberg Code. Patients would have to provide written, informed consent.

Wilson wrote, "By reason of the basic medical responsibility in connection with the development of defense of all types against atomic, biological and/or chemical warfare agents, Armed Services personnel and/or civilians on duty at installations engaged in such research shall be permitted to actively participate in all phases of the program."

Jonathan Moreno and Susan Lederer wrote in a 1996 issue of the Kennedy Institute of Ethics Journal that the Wilson Memo remained classified until 1975, limiting its availability to researchers. They found the Air Force and Army tried to implement the rules but found spotty compliance in actual Pentagon research.

== "Dynamic Programming" ==
Mathematician Richard Bellman states in his biography that Wilson disliked the word "research" and recounts in his biography his origin of the term "dynamic programming":

I spent the Fall quarter (of 1950) at RAND. My first task was to find a name for multistage decision processes. An interesting question is, Where did the name, dynamic programming, come from? The 1950s were not good years for mathematical research. We had a very interesting gentleman in Washington named Wilson. He was Secretary of Defense, and he actually had a pathological fear and hatred of the word research. I’m not using the term lightly; I’m using it precisely. His face would suffuse, he would turn red, and he would get violent if people used the term research in his presence. You can imagine how he felt, then, about the term mathematical. The RAND Corporation was employed by the Air Force, and the Air Force had Wilson as its boss, essentially. Hence, I felt I had to do something to shield Wilson and the Air Force from the fact that I was really doing mathematics inside the RAND Corporation. What title, what name, could I choose? In the first place I was interested in planning, in decision making, in thinking. But planning, is not a good word for various reasons. I decided therefore to use the word "programming". I wanted to get across the idea that this was dynamic, this was multistage, this was time-varying. I thought, let's kill two birds with one stone. Let's take a word that has an absolutely precise meaning, namely dynamic, in the classical physical sense. It also has a very interesting property as an adjective, and that it's impossible to use the word dynamic in a pejorative sense. Try thinking of some combination that will possibly give it a pejorative meaning. It's impossible. Thus, I thought dynamic programming was a good name. It was something not even a Congressman could object to. So I used it as an umbrella for my activities.

== Later life and death ==
After he left the Pentagon, Wilson returned to Michigan, where he devoted his time to business and family affairs. He died in Norwood, Louisiana, and was interred at the Acacia Park Cemetery, a Masonic cemetery in Beverly Hills, Michigan, a suburb of Detroit.

== Nickname ==
Charles Erwin Wilson should not be confused with Charles Edward Wilson, who was the CEO of General Electric and served President Truman as the director of the Office of Defense Mobilization. The two were respectively nicknamed "Engine Charlie" and "Electric Charlie" so that they could be more easily distinguished.

Business positions
Preceded by Alfred P. Sloan	CEO of General Motors; 1946 – 1953	Succeeded by Harlow Curtice
Preceded by William S. Knudsen	President of General Motors; 1941 – 1953	Succeeded by Harlow Curtice
Political offices
Preceded by Robert A. Lovett	U.S. Secretary of Defense; Served under: Dwight D. Eisenhower; 1953–1957	Succeeded by Neil H. McElroy
