= Ramón M. Suárez Calderon =

Puerto Rican scientist

Dr. Ramón M. Suárez Calderón
- Born: May 8, 1895; Loíza, Puerto Rico
- Died: December 16, 1981 (aged 86); San Juan, Puerto Rico
- Education: Medical College of Virginia (M.D.)
- Occupations: scientist, cardiologist, educator and hematologíst

Dr. Ramón M. Suárez Calderón (1895–1981) was a scientist, cardiologist, educator and hematologíst whose investigations led him to identify the proper and effective treatment of a specific disease known as tropical sprue. He also refined the protocols for numerous diagnostic procedures, such as electrocardiography and radioisotope, for the clinical identification and treatment of the disease which causes heart rheumatism.

== Early years ==
Suárez Calderon was born in the town of Loiza in Puerto Rico. His family moved to San Juan, the capital of Puerto Rico, where he received his primary and secondary education. He attended the Central High School of Santurce and studied medicine at the Medical College of Virginia in the United States. In 1917 he earned his medical degree and moved to the Dominican Republic, where he was hired as the medical physician at a sugar plantation.

He returned to Puerto Rico in 1920, and in 1928 he was named Medical Director of San Juan's Municipal Hospital and faculty member of the Tropical School of Medicine. Tragedy struck when his 5-year-old daughter died of Leukemia. Suárez Calderón, who at the time was the President of the Medical Association of Puerto Rico, named a hospital which he founded after his daughter.

== School of Tropical Medicine ==
During his years at the School of Tropical Medicine, Suárez Calderón worked together with Dr. Bailey Ashford. Dr. Ashford was a member of the United States Army Medical Corps, and had accompanied the military expedition to Puerto Rico during the Puerto Rico Campaign of the Spanish–American War in 1898. Ashford assumed a full-time faculty position at the School of Tropical Medicine and continued his interest in tropical medicine. Together with the University of Puerto Rico campus at Rio Piedras, Ashford helped to plan and build the Institute of Tropical Medicine. Dr. Ashford was the first to describe and successfully treat North American hookworm in 1899. A tireless clinician, Ashford conducted an exhaustive study of the anemia caused by hookworm infestation, which was responsible for as many as 12,000 deaths a year.

Upon the recommendation of Ashford, the American College of Physicians granted a fellowship to Suárez Calderon, which enabled Suárez Calderon to continue Ashford's work and investigations on anemia after the latter's death. In 1938, Suárez Calderon published his scientific findings on the Tropical Sprue.

== Scientific investigations ==
In 1940, Suárez Calderón was named director of internal medicine of the Tropical School of Medicine. During his directorship he conducted scientific investigations related to hypertension and other cardiovascular diseases. He also conducted investigations related to rheumatic fever and its causes. In 1945, Suárez Calderón published his findings in the effective treatment of Tropical Sprue associated anemia with the application of complex methods, such as the use of folic acid, electrocardiography and radioisotope in the American Journal of Medicine. Suárez Calderon was also named to the board of directors of Blood, a new medical magazine, thus becoming the first and only Puerto Rican member of that publication.

Suárez Calderón, who was also a member of the Association of American Physicians, founded a center of clinical investigations at the Mimiya Hospital. He published 155 articles related to his investigations in the field of cardiology in various scientific journals.

== Written works ==
Two of the published works by Suárez Calderon are:

- Tratamiento moderno del asma bronquial; published by the Boletín Asociación Médica de Puerto Rico; 1925
- Glucose and the heart; published by Boletín Asociación Médica de Puerto Rico; 1974.

== Legacy ==
Suárez Calderon continued to teach at the school of medicine in Puerto Rico. He was also the personal doctor of Pablo Casals and Luis Muñoz Marín. He died in 1981 at his home in San Juan. He was buried at Porta Coeli Cemetery in Bayamón, Puerto Rico. In 1992, the City of San Juan inaugurated the Dr. Ramón M. Suárez Calderón Cardiovascular Center of Puerto Rico and the Caribbean. It is the main medical and academic center in the region dedicated to the diagnosis, treatment and prevention of cardiovascular diseases. In 1999, the first heart transplant in Puerto Rico was made in said medical institution.

== See also ==
- Dr. Isaac González Martínez
- List of Puerto Ricans
- Puerto Rican scientists and inventors
