= William Bosworth Castle =

American physician and physiologist

- Born: October 21, 1897; Cambridge, Massachusetts
- Died: August 9, 1990 (aged 92)
- Education: Harvard University, Harvard Medical School
- Known for: Putting hematology on a scientific basis
- Spouse: Louise Muller (m. 1933)
- Children: Anne, William
- Parents: William E. Castle (father); Clara Sears Castle (mother)
- Scientific career
- Fields: Medicine, physiology
- Institutions: Massachusetts General Hospital, Harvard School of Public Health
- Academic advisors: George R. Minot

William Bosworth Castle (October 21, 1897 – August 9, 1990) was an American physician and physiologist who transformed hematology from a "descriptive art to a dynamic interdisciplinary science."

== Life ==
Castle was born to William E. Castle and his wife in Cambridge, Massachusetts. His father was a professor of zoology at Harvard, a pioneer in mammalian genetics, and a member of the U.S. National Academy of Sciences. The young Castle was educated in local schools and entered Harvard College in 1914. At the end of his third year of college, he enrolled in Harvard Medical School. Upon graduating from medical school, he did a medical internship at the Massachusetts General Hospital from 1921 to 1923.

At the Mass General, he had his first direct exposure to some of the great clinicians of the time, including Chester M. Jones, with whom he collaborated on his first medical publication, and George R. Minot, who later became Castle's mentor and unflagging supporter. (Minot later shared the Nobel Prize.)

In 1923 Castle accepted a position in the laboratory of Cecil Drinker at the Harvard School of Public Health.

In 1925 Castle went back into a clinical setting at the Thorndike Memorial Laboratory on the Harvard service at the Boston City Hospital. He remained on the faculty of Harvard Medical School for his entire career.

He was elected a Fellow of the American Academy of Arts and Sciences in 1931. In 1939, Castle was elected to both the United States National Academy of Sciences and the American Philosophical Society. In 1939 he was also awarded the Walter Reed Medal from the American Society of Tropical Medicine and Hygiene. The two Castles became the first father-and-son members in the history of that prestigious body.

== Marriage and family ==
William B. Castle married Louise Muller in 1933. They had a daughter Anne and a son William.

== Work ==
William B. Castle discovered gastric intrinsic factor, the absence of which causes pernicious anemia. Intrinsic factor was necessary to facilitate the absorption of an 'extrinsic factor' from the diet. Whipple, Minot and Murphy were awarded the Nobel Prize for Physiology and Medicine, in 1934, for the discovery of the "anti-pernicious anæmia factor" from their experiments with liver in the diet. The 'extrinsic factor' is now known as vitamin B12 (cobalamin) and provides an effective therapy for pernicious anemia.

In 1931 Castle went to Puerto Rico sponsored by the Rockefeller Foundation International Health Board in a public health project. He conducted a several-month study for the Rockefeller Anemia Commission, as part of the Rockefeller Foundation's work in trying to combat hookworm in the Caribbean. Anemia was widespread on the island because of the endemic parasite hookworm and tropical sprue, the latter a disease which scientists thought possibly related to diet. Castle was assisted by Cornelius P. Rhoads, known as Dusty, who was affiliated with the Rockefeller Institute in New York and later became head of Memorial Hospital for Cancer Care and Research. He also worked with George C. Payne.

They showed that tropical sprue was caused by intestinal impermeability to this and other hematopoietic factors in food. They were able to use liver extract therapy to treat tropical sprue successfully. It is still a problem in Puerto Rico, but it can be treated with folic acid and a 3-6 month course of antibiotics.

In closely related studies, Castle defined the need for iron for the bone marrow to make hemoglobin. Without adequate iron in the diet, children and adults develop iron deficiency anemia, a common scourge.

Castle and his team later characterized the red blood cell defects that are responsible for paroxysmal nocturnal hemoglobinuria and hereditary spherocytosis. They also did important research on sickle cell disease. It is a genetic disease found at high frequency among people of African ethnicity.

== A train ride ==
In 1945 Castle and the biochemist Linus Pauling traveled together by overnight train from Denver to Chicago. On the train Castle told Pauling about some of the work he had been doing on sickle cell disease and mentioned that when red cells sickled, they changed shape and showed birefringence in polarized light. Castle believed that some kind of molecular alignment or orientation must be occurring. Castle suggested that this might be "the kind of thing" in which Pauling might be interested.

It was. The following year, Pauling and his colleagues at Caltech began the studies that eventually showed that the hemoglobin in sickle cell disease was abnormal. Pauling and coworkers wrote Sickle Cell Anemia, a Molecular Disease.

== Sources ==
- Biographical Memoir of William B. Castle by James H. Jandl for the National Academy of Sciences
- Oral History of William Bosworth Castle from the American Society of Hematology
- Warthin TA (1992). "William Bosworth Castle". Trans. Am. Clin. Climatol. Assoc. 103: lii–lv. PMC 2376702. PMID 1413365.
