= Jay Katz =

American physician and law professor (1922–2008)

Jacob "Jay" Katz (October 20, 1922 – November 17, 2008) was an American physician and Yale Law School professor whose career was devoted to addressing complex issues of medical ethics and other ethical problems involving the overlaps of ethics, law, medicine and psychology.

== Early life ==
Katz was born in Zwickau, Germany on October 20, 1922, where his father owned a department store. After Adolf Hitler came to power in 1933, Nazi Germany implemented rules stripping the family of their German citizenship. His father obtained a Czechoslovak passport, which he used to leave Germany and travel to Prague as a 16-year-old. He made it to New York City through Italy and England, with his parents and brother joining him in the United States in 1940.

He graduated from The University of Vermont in 1944 and was awarded his Doctor of Medicine degree in 1949 from Harvard Medical School. He completed internship and residency programs in New York, and then enlisted in the United States Air Force. He served as a First Lieutenant and Captain at the Air Force Hospital at Maxwell Air Force Base in Montgomery, Alabama.

== Career ==
Katz began his four-decades-long affiliation with Yale University in 1953 when he became Chief Resident at the Yale School of Medicine's outpatient clinic. He started teaching psychiatry in 1955 and became an assistant professor of psychiatry and law at Yale University in 1958, teaching psychiatry and law. He continued to teach as an emeritus professor after his retirement from Yale in 1993.

He served on the committee which established the terms of patient privilege in Connecticut for psychotherapists and their patients. Enacted in 1961, it was used to establish comparable terms in the Federal Rules of Evidence that apply across the United States.

Katz was named to serve on a federal inquiry into the Tuskegee Syphilis Study, an experiment started in 1932 by the United States Public Health Service in which about 400 black men in Alabama infected with syphilis were left untreated, with at least 28 of the study subjects dying from the untreated disease and many more suffering severe injury. The group concluded that the research was "ethically unjustified", that the participants should have been given penicillin and called for greater federal oversight and protection of subjects in medical studies. Katz protested that the group should have issued a stronger response, noting that the subjects were "exploited, manipulated and deceived". Katz noted that the question of when "can human beings be used for purposes of acquisition of knowledge" must be answered and that the disadvantaged and disempowered are often deliberately chosen as subjects.

After efforts were made by scientists to make use of data from Nazi human experimentation, conducted on concentration camp inmates against their will, Katz emphasized that "however hard we might try, we cannot separate the data from the way they were obtained".

He was appointed to serve on the 1994 Advisory Committee on Human Radiation Experiments, established by President Bill Clinton to investigate some 30 experiments in which individuals were unwittingly exposed to radiation. Katz issued a statement as part of the committee's report, stating that his "most serious reservations" were about the issue of protections to study subjects, and that the existing informed consent process invites "repetitions of the dignitary insults which unconsenting citizen-patients suffered during the Cold War".

In 1996, the U.S. Food and Drug Administration implemented changes that allowed doctors to perform medical studies on patients without their consent in certain situations where the patient has a life-threatening condition and cannot offer consent, where the community has been notified about the experiment and where the FDA has reviewed the plans in advance and approved of the protocol. Katz insisted that these changes violated the Nuremberg Code enacted in response to Nazi human experimentation conducted on unwilling prisoners during World War II, noting that "here we are making exceptions" to the first sentence of the Code's first point, which states that "The voluntary consent of the human subject is absolutely essential".

Katz was involved in renaming the Cornelius P. Rhoads award given for cancer research from the American Association for Cancer Research, in 2002. He determined that although Rhoads' racist and inflammatory letter was reprehensible, Rhoads did not actually murder or inject cancer into anyone, or participate in medical misconduct. Nonetheless, due to Rhoads' racism, which denigrated Puerto Ricans and Italians, the award was renamed.

== Writings ==
Katz wrote extensively on subjects of medicine, law and their interconnections. His books included The Family and the Law (1964, with Joseph Goldstein), Psychoanalysis, Psychiatry and Law (1967, with Alan Dershowitz and Joseph Goldstein), Experimentation with Human Beings (1972), Catastrophic Diseases: Who Decides What? (1975, with Alexander M. Capron) and The Silent World of Doctor and Patient (1984). He also wrote on the importance of physicians collaborating with patients to obtain informed consent.

== Death ==
Katz died at age 86 on November 17, 2008, at his home in New Haven, Connecticut of heart failure.
