= Barnwell, Northamptonshire =

Village in Northamptonshire, England

Coordinates: 52.45027°N 0.46375°W

Barnwell
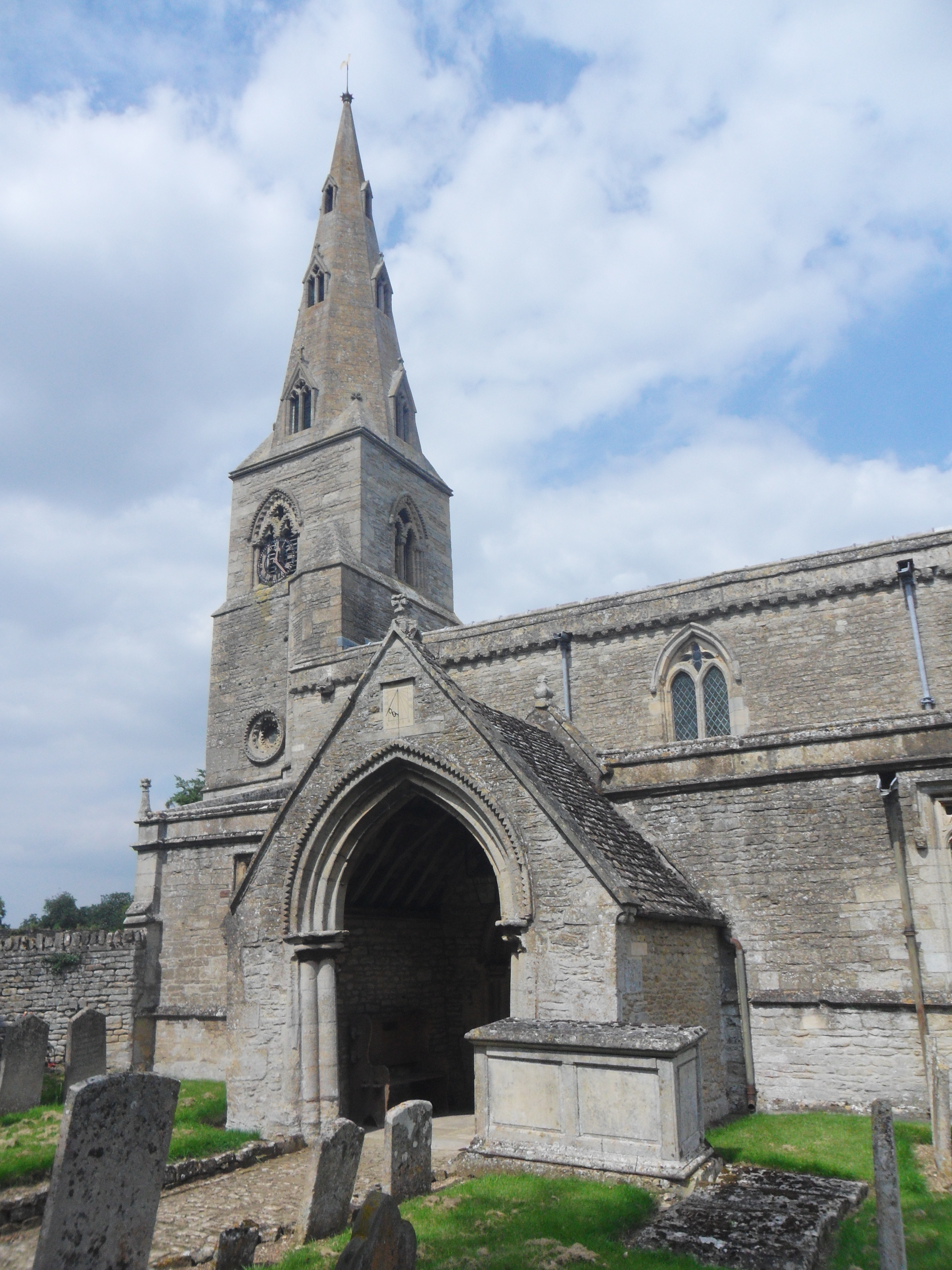
- St Andrew's, Barnwell

- Location within Northamptonshire
- Population: 369 (2011)
- OS grid reference: TL045847
  - London: 78 miles
- Civil parish: Barnwell
- Unitary authority: North Northamptonshire
- Ceremonial county: Northamptonshire
- Region: East Midlands
- Country: England
- Sovereign state: United Kingdom
- Post town: Peterborough
- Postcode district: PE8
- Dialling code: 01832
- Police: Northamptonshire
- Fire: Northamptonshire
- Ambulance: East Midlands
- UK Parliament: Corby and East Northamptonshire

Barnwell (formerly Barnwell All Saints and Barnwell St Andrew) is a village and civil parish in the North Northamptonshire district, in Northamptonshire, England, 2 miles (3.2 km) south of the town of Oundle, 78 miles (126 km) north of London (via the A1 road) and 14 miles (22.5 km) south-west of Peterborough. The River Nene runs north of the village, separating it from Oundle.

The villages name origin is uncertain. 'Warrior's spring/stream', 'Beorna's spring/stream' or 'burial-place spring/stream'.

== Demographics ==
The 2001 census showed there were 362 people living in the village, 171 male, 191 female, with average age 40.54 years in 150 households. The population shown at the 2011 census was 369.

== Governance ==
The village has a parish council and. since 2021, is part of North Northamptonshire. It was formerly governed by East Northamptonshire District Council, where it was in Barnwell Ward, and Northamptonshire County Council where it was in Thrapston division.

Barnwell is part of the parliamentary constituency of Corby.

== Facilities and other buildings ==
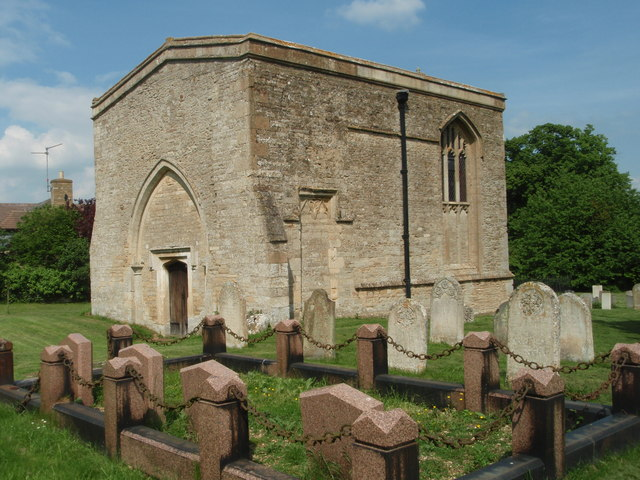
All Saints' chancel

The village has two Church of England churches reflecting the fact that the village is formed from two separate ones. St Andrew's is Grade I listed; it is externally mostly 13th-century including a tower. There are monuments to Christopher Freeman (d.1610) and Rev Nicholas Latham (d.1620). All Saints' is also 13th-century but only the chancel remains after the rest was demolished in 1825 and that retains the Montagu monuments: Henry Montagu (d.1625), Dame Letice Montagu (d.1611). All Saints is Grade II* listed. Poet Mary Rolls' husband Henry Rolls was rector first at St Andrew's (1818) and then All Saints (1819).

South-east of the church are Latham's Almshouses (founded 1601, rebuilt 1874). Barnwell railway station on the Northampton to Peterborough line closed in 1964. The building remains preserved as a private residence on the corner of Well Lane and the A605. There is a traditional pub The Montagu Arms. Barnwell St Andrew Church of England Primary School was closed by the county council in 2005 in spite of protests. Children now attend the primary school at Oundle.

== Local attractions ==
=== Barnwell Country Park ===
Like many similar areas on the River Nene, Barnwell Country Park was developed from abandoned sand and gravel workings on the flood plain of the river just south of Oundle in the part of the area known as Rockingham Forest. The park is bounded on the north-west and south-west by a flood channel loop of the River Nene, known as 'the Backwater', and on the east by the A605 Barnwell Road. It consists of a series of willow-fringed lakes, short mown grass, coarser vegetation, conservation grassland and small wooded areas. The lakes, picnic meadows, river and the resident water birds make the park very attractive to visitors and in particular young families. The irregular shapes of the lakes provide different views around each corner and give a sense of "progressive revelation" to visitors.

The park is flat and very accessible with a network of stone paths suitable for prams and wheelchairs. There is a Ranger Service, on hand to answer visitors' queries and to provide general assistance. In 2007 to 2008, 191,874 visits were made to the park (electronic car counter, assuming 3.5 people per car). From the 2007 visitor surveys, picnicking, dog walking, leisurely strolls, feeding the water birds, fishing and watching the wildlife are the main reason for visits. There is a hard-standing car park for 50 cars and the recreational meadows are used for overflow parking.

The park, totalling 37 acres (15 ha), was owned by Northamptonshire County Council. The Ordnance Survey grid reference is TL 036874.

=== Barnwell Castle ===
Barnwell Castle is in the northern part of the village and believed to have been built around 1266. It is described as 'the first example in Britain of the most monumental type of castle architecture. The site is private property but can be seen from the road.

=== Barnwell Manor ===
Barnwell Manor is the historic former home of the Duke and Duchess of Gloucester and is part of the Barnwell Castle Estate. The manor was granted to the Montagu family in 1540 by King Henry VIII. In 1938 Prince Henry, Duke of Gloucester, bought the house and estate and the family still retain it but now live in an apartment in Kensington Palace, London.
