= Bang for the buck =

English idiom

"Bang for the buck" is an idiom meaning the worth of one's money or exertion. The phrase originated from the slang usage of the words "bang" which means "excitement" and "buck" which means "money". Variations of the term include "bang for your buck," "bang for one's buck," "more bang for the buck," "bigger bang for the buck," and mixings of these. "More bang for the buck" was preceded by "more bounce to the ounce", an advertising slogan used in 1950 to market the carbonated soft drink Pepsi.

The phrase "bigger bang for the buck" was notably used by U.S. President Dwight D. Eisenhower's Secretary of Defense, Charles Erwin Wilson, in 1954. He used it to describe the New Look policy of depending on nuclear weapons, rather than a large regular army, to keep the Soviet Union in check. Today, the phrase is used to mean a greater worth for the money used.

== History and usage ==
[Bang for the (or one's) buck], which means 'value for one's money', was originally a political one. Its first use was quite literal: With bang referring to 'firepower' or 'weaponry', it really did mean 'bombs for one's money'. The alliteration of bang and buck helps to make the phrase memorable.

— Random House, December 19, 1997

William Safire discussed "bang for the buck" in his 1968 book, New Language of Politics. Safire stated that U.S. Secretary of Defense Charles Erwin Wilson used the phrase in 1954 to summarize the New Look policy. The New Look, a 1950s national security policy during the administration of President Dwight D. Eisenhower, was called "more bang for the buck", and "bigger bang for the buck". "More bang for the buck" was also used in the late 1960s by the U.S. military to refer to how it wanted to receive more combat power from the armaments it possessed. The United States, instead of supporting a large regular army, increasingly depended on nuclear weapons to hold the Soviet Union in check.

"Bigger bang for the buck" is similar to the phrase "more bounce to the ounce", an advertising catchphrase used in 1950 by PepsiCo to market its soft drink product Pepsi.

Sometimes the phrase is used to mean "a better value for the money spent".

== Criticism ==
In 2001, author Matthew L. Stone wrote that the phrase "has been overused almost to the point of becoming meaningless". In her 2010 book The Trouble with Thinking, Lauren Powers wrote that whenever she hears the cliché "bigger bang for the buck", she becomes "distracted" by the phrase's history and cannot continue paying attention to the speaker's words.

== See also ==
- Consumer choice
- Cost-effectiveness
- Value added
