= The Silent World of Doctor and Patient =

1984 book by Jay Katz

- Author: Jay Katz
- Language: English
- Subject: Medical ethics
- Genre: Non-fiction
- Publisher: The Free Press
- Publication date: 1984

The Silent World of Doctor and Patient is an influential book on medical ethics written by Jay Katz and published by The Free Press in 1984.
