= Richard Hillary (merchant) =

English merchant in Liverpool

Richard Hillary (1703–1789) was an English merchant and ship-owner in Liverpool.

== Background ==
Hillary was from a Yorkshire and Quaker background, his father being John Hillary of Birkrigg near Hawes and mother Mary Robinson his wife. They had three sons and six daughters, Richard being the youngest son; the physician William Hillary was the second son. His mother was the daughter of Richard Robinson of Countersett. Around 1700 the family moved to Burtersett. They were linked to the Fothergill brothers, of the Carr End Quaker family: the eldest son Isaac was on good terms with Alexander Fothergill, the elder brother, while William and John Fothergill the physician were both apprentices of Benjamin Bartlett the apothecary, father of Benjamin Bartlett the antiquary.

== Merchant ==
Hillary was a Liverpool shipowner from 1746, in a number of consortia. He was in correspondence with John Reynell of Philadelphia by 1748.

Richard Hillary & Co. were potters at Dale Street/Preston Street in Liverpool, from 1753. Hillary was partner with others (John Atkinson, James Gibson, Samuel Kenyon, James Roscoe). As merchants they took a lease from William Rowe. Hillary is mentioned as a tanner, and as having a warehouse (new) in Tower Gardens, in 1757.

In 1763 Hillary was granted administration of his brother William's estate. A 1766 Liverpool directory has Hillary based in Oldhall Street. The firm of Hillary & Scott consisted of Hillary and John Scott, a nephew: he was the son of Richard's eldest sister Ann (born 1693), who had married Joseph Scott of Countersett. They participated mostly in the West Indian trade. In 1766 they were based in the Old Churchyard, Chapel Street. They also traded from Old Hall (Oldhall) Street.

After his marriage, Hillary moved with his family to Dale Street. Hillary & Scott co-owned the Hillary, a snow. It made voyages to Tortola, where Quakers had settled. Hillary became a plantation owner, in Jamaica; at one point the Hillary family business owned 900 slaves.

== Death and legacy ==
Hillary died leaving estates in Yorkshire and Jamaica to his eldest son.

== Family ==
Hillary married a Quaker, Hannah Wynne or Winn in 1764, sister of Isaac Lascelles Winn. They had three children who survived to adulthood.

The elder son Richard junior died in November 1803, in Jamaica, where he was a member of the House of Representatives, at age 35; he resided at Sewardstone outside London, and left property including sugar estates to his brother William Hillary, who had also inherited when John Scott died in 1791. Mary Rolls the poet was the daughter of the marriage.
