= Bailey Ashford =

American soldier, physician and author

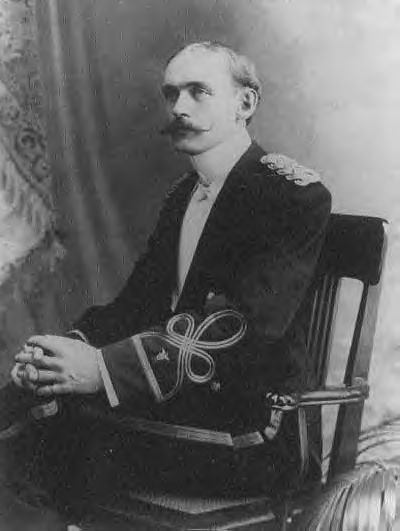
- Born: September 18, 1873; Washington, D.C., United States
- Died: November 1, 1934 (aged 61); San Juan, Puerto Rico
- Burial place: Puerto Rico National Cemetery
- Military career
- Allegiance: United States of America
- Branch: United States Army
- Service years: 1897–1928
- Rank: Colonel
- Unit: United States Army Medical Corps
- Conflicts: Spanish–American War; World War I
- Awards: Distinguished Service Medal
- Other work: Ashford was a founding member of the Puerto Rico Anemia Commission, and initiated the School of Tropical Medicine

Colonel Bailey Kelly Ashford (September 18, 1873 – November 1, 1934) was an American medical doctor who had a military career in the United States Army, and afterward taught full-time at the School of Tropical Medicine in Puerto Rico, which he helped establish in San Juan.

A pioneering physician in the treatment of anemia, Ashford organized and conducted a parasite treatment campaign against hookworm while stationed in Puerto Rico. This cured approximately 300,000 persons (one-third of the Puerto Rico population) and reduced the death rate from associated anemia by 90 percent. He was a founding member of the Puerto Rico Anemia Commission.

== Early years ==
Ashford was born in Washington, D.C., on September 18, 1873, as one of five children in the family of Francis Ashford, a prominent physician, and his wife. His general education was obtained at the public schools and at Columbian University in Washington, D.C. (now George Washington University). In 1896, he graduated from the Georgetown University School of Medicine. He served as a resident physician in several area hospitals.

Commissioned lieutenant in the United States Army Medical Corps in November 1897, Ashford accompanied the military expedition to Puerto Rico in 1898 during the Spanish–American War.

== Personal life ==
Ashford made Puerto Rico his adopted home, marrying a local woman, María López Nussa. They had three children: Mahlon, Margarita, and Gloria María.

== Professional life ==
=== Hookworm treatment ===
Serving as the medical officer in the general military hospital in Ponce, Puerto Rico, in 1899 he was the first to describe and successfully treat North American hookworm. He was a tireless clinician and conducted an exhaustive study of the anemia caused by hookworm infestation, which was the leading cause of death and responsible for as many as 12,000 deaths a year. From 1903 to 1904, together with his colleague Pedro Gutiérrez Igaravídez, he organized and conducted a parasite treatment and education campaign, which treated approximately 300,000 persons (one-third of the Puerto Rico population). This work reduced the death rate from this anemia by 90 percent. Through Ashford's professor, Charles Wardell Stiles, his work also led to the creation of a seminal campaign to fight hookworm in the American South that was funded by John D. Rockefeller.

=== Anemia treatment ===
Captain Ashford was a founding member of the Puerto Rico Anemia Commission. By special authority of the Secretary of War, he served on the Commission from 1904 to 1906.

=== School of Tropical Medicine ===
In 1911, his proposal for an Institute of Tropical Medicine (Later renamed School of Tropical Medicine) in Puerto Rico was approved by Antonio R. Barceló, the president of the Puerto Rican Senate. He pushed for passage of the legislation to authorize the school, and Governor Horace Mann Towner and his cabinet proceeded to create it. After serving as a commander of the Army Medical Department's First Division during World War I, Colonel Ashford was assigned to San Juan. He campaigned for the development of "a real school of tropical medicine in the American tropics".

Ashford was promoted to lieutenant colonel in July 1916 and colonel in May 1917. During World War I, he left Puerto Rico to serve as director of the U.S. Army Sanitary School in Langres, France.

The School of Tropical Medicine of Puerto Rico was formally dedicated in 1925.

Ashford retired from active duty on February 10, 1928. After a 30-year Army career as a military doctor, he assumed a full-time faculty position at the School, where he continued his interest in tropical medicine. Together with doctors Isaac González Martínez and Ramón M. Suárez Calderon, he continued to carry out experiments related to anemia. The University of Puerto Rico campus at Rio Piedras, the building of the Institute of Tropical Medicine (see drawings) in Puerta de Tierra, San Juan, is one of the few examples of the Neo-Plateresque architectural style in the Island.

== Legacy and honors ==
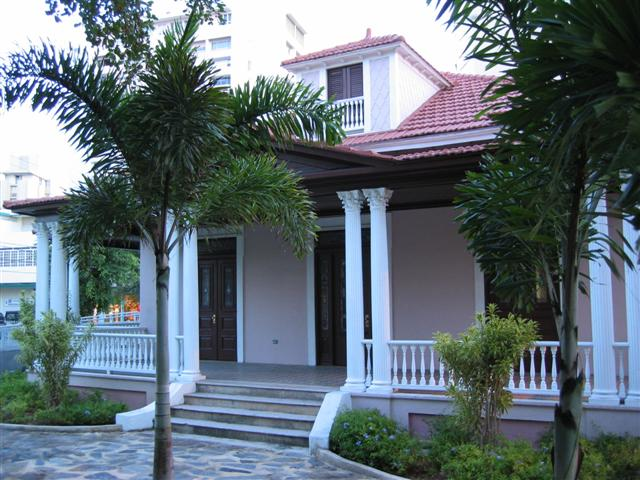
Ashford House in Condado, Puerto Rico

In his honor, the main avenue in the San Juan, Puerto Rico district of Condado, bears his name as does the Ashford Presbyterian Community Hospital as well as the Ashford Medical Center, also in Condado. Built in 1912 on Ashford Avenue, his home is preserved as a museum known as the Casa de Cultura Dr. Bailey K. Ashford (Dr. Bailey K. Ashford Culture House).

In 1911, Ashford was conferred the honorary degree of Doctor of Science by Georgetown University. In 1915, he was nominated for the Nobel Prize in Physiology or Medicine by Georgetown University professors George M. Kober and Francis A. Tondorf. In 1925, Ashford was awarded the Distinguished Service Medal for his World War I service.

In 1941, The American Society of Tropical Medicine and Hygiene established the "Bailey K. Ashford Medal". This is awarded for distinguished work in tropical medicine to a worker in his or her early or mid-career. The first person to receive the award was Lloyd E. Rozeboom. The medal is awarded every year, and more than one award may be given.

Ashford died on November 1, 1934, in his home in San Juan. Originally buried at the Fort Brooke Military Cemetery, his remains were re-interred at Puerto Rico National Cemetery in the city of Bayamón on April 20, 1954.

== See also ==
- List of Puerto Ricans
