= Isaac González Martínez =

Puerto Rican urologist

- Born: July 8, 1871; Utuado, Puerto Rico
- Died: April 20, 1954 (aged 82); San Juan, Puerto Rico
- Education: Complutense University of Madrid (M.D.)
- Occupation: Urologist
- Spouse: María Luisa Blanes Mangual (1879–1970)
- Children: Alicia González Blanes, Héctor González Blanes and Georgina González Blanes

Notes
- González Martínez is Puerto Rico's first Oncologist

Isaac González Martínez (Note: In this Spanish name, the first or paternal surname is González and the second or maternal family name is Martínez.) (July 8, 1871 – April 20, 1954) was a Puerto Rican medical doctor. He was the first Puerto Rican urologist, and a pioneer in the fight against cancer throughout the island. González Martínez conducted many investigations and experiments in parasitology, bilharzia, leprosy and typhoid fever. González Martínez and Bailey Ashford were the founders of the first commission in Puerto Rico to study the causes of anemia. In 1914, he was named director of the biological laboratory of the sanitation service of Puerto Rico. In 1935, González Martínez founded the Puerto Rican League against Cancer. He also promoted the construction of Puerto Rico's first hospital specializing in oncology.

== Early years ==
González Martínez was born in a coffee plantation in the town of Utuado in the central mountainous region of Puerto Rico. His family moved to the City of Mayaguez where he received his secondary education. González Martínez earned a teachers certificate from the Normal School of Mayaguez and taught history and mathematics at a local school for a short time. In 1890, his family sent him to the School of Medicine of Barcelona in Spain where he earned a degree in medicine. Later he earned a doctoral degree at the Complutense University of Madrid.

González Martínez returned to Puerto Rico in 1900 and set up his medical practice in Mayaguez. He was named Director of the Laboratories of the Department of Health and also the head of the sanitation department in that city.

== Anemia Commission ==
González Martínez was interested in parasitology, a new medical concept in the island, and worked with Bailey Ashford in the Anemia Commission. Ashford was a member of the United States Army Medical Corps, who accompanied the military expedition to Puerto Rico during the Puerto Rico Campaign of the Spanish–American War in 1898.

== Discovery of Intestinal Bilharzias ==
In 1904, González Martínez discovered that the Schistosomiasis eggs were different from the uncinariasis (Hookworm) eggs. He discovered that these parasitic worms, named bilharzias, were infecting his patients' intestines and damaging their livers. Bilharzias, or snail fever, is a parasitic disease caused by several species of trematodes (platyhelminth infection, or "flukes"), a parasitic worm of the genus Schistosoma. He reported his findings to the American Medical Journals and in 1907, his findings were confirmed by the international medical community.

== Bubonic plague ==
The Bubonic plague, a zoonotic disease, had spread throughout Europe in the early 1900s. González Martínez went to Spain to study the fields of urology and bacteriology. González Martínez was interested in epidemiology, the scientific study of epidemics, and went to Lisbon, Portugal with a Spanish commission who wanted to learn ways of controlling the spread of epidemics.

He returned to Puerto Rico after conducting his investigations and in 1912, detected a Bubonic plague epidemic in the island. He separated the patients who had the infection from those who did not, and applied the proper treatments. Due to his actions, within 90 days, the epidemic was brought under control.

== School of Tropical Medicine ==
In 1912 González Martínez, together with Ashford, Pedro Gutiérrez Igaravides and Walter King, founded the School of Tropical Medicine. Ashford assumed a full-time faculty position at the school of medicine and continued his interest in tropical medicine. The building of the Institute of Tropical Medicine is located at the University of Puerto Rico campus at Rio Piedras, and Ashford was the first to describe and successfully treat North American hookworm in 1899.

González Martínez founded "Anales de Medicina de Puerto Rico", a scientific journal. He was elected president of the Medical Academy of Puerto Rico in 1917. In 1919, he published a chapter on his findings of the Intestinal Bilharzias in the book La Práctica de la Medicina en el Trópico.

In 1920, González Martínez went to Paris, France to study radiology at the Curie Institute. After graduating he returned to Puerto Rico and was named director and consultant of the radiology department of the School of Tropical Medicine. In 1929, he was named director of the radiology department of the Días García Clinic which has since been renamed Hospital Pavia. González Martínez was a member of the American Association of Parasitology and the American Association of Public Health. In 1938, he became a "fellow" of the American College of Radiology.

== Puerto Rican League against Cancer ==
González Martínez became interested in studying the causes and treatment of cancer. In 1827, he traveled once more to Paris and enrolled in the Paris Institute of Cancer. He returned to Puerto Rico and in May 1938, González Martínez founded the Puerto Rican League against Cancer and established a clinic to treat patients with the disease in Santurce. He offered his services and treated patients free of charge. That same year he published a scientific article in the permanent cure and treatment of cervical Uterine cancer. The construction of the first ontological hospital began in 1953 at the Centro Medico de Puerto Rico (Puerto Rico's Medical Center).

== Legacy ==
On September 22, 1950, the Puerto Rican Chapter of the American Cancer Society recognized González Martínez as Puerto Rico's first Oncologist.

On April 20, 1954, González Martínez died in his home, in the same year he was to be honored with an Honorary Doctorate degree from the first graduating class of the School of Medicine of the University of Puerto Rico, he was buried at the Puerto Rico Memorial Cemetery in Carolina, Puerto Rico. The oncological hospital at the Centro Medico de Puerto Rico was named after him, as the Hospital Oncologico Dr. Isaac González Martínez. Several public schools in different levels, called Isaac González Martínez, are also named after him.

== See also ==
- Ramón M. Suárez Calderon
- List of Puerto Ricans
- Puerto Rican scientists and inventors
