= Mary Rolls =

English poet (1775–1835)

- Born: Mary Hillary; 13 September 1775
- Died: 8 April 1835 (aged 59); Aldwincle, Northamptonshire
- Occupation: Poet
- Parents: Richard Hillary (father); Hannah Wynne (mother)
- Relatives: William Hillary (brother)

Mary Rolls (née Hillary; 13 September 1775 (Note: Rolls' obituary in The Gentleman's Magazine incorrectly gave her age as 54, leading many later sources to state her year of birth as 1781/1782.) – 8 April 1835) was an English poet, who wrote under the name Mrs Henry Rolls.

== Life ==
Born on 13 September 1775 to Hannah (née Wynne; 1738–1806) and Richard Hillary (1703–1789) of Liverpool. (Note: While the Oxford Dictionary of National Biography says she was born in Westmorland, and The Feminist Companion to Literature in English (1990) says that she grew up there, her birth records list her parents as being from Liverpool, where her brother was also born.) She was raised as a Quaker along with her older brothers Richard (1768–1803) and William (1771–1847). She looked after her mother, whose 1804 will mentions "Mary's long tried affectionate and unremitting care through my long ill health and severe illnesses".

She married Henry Rolls (bapt. 1782–1838) on 16 July 1810, at St Anne's Church, Liverpool. He entered Christ's College, Cambridge in December 1810, was ordained in 1813, served a curacy at Boxworth, Cambridgeshire (1813–1816) before becoming rector first of Barnwell St Andrew (1818), then Barnwell All Saints (1819), and finally All Saints Aldwincle (from 1820), all in Northamptonshire. They had at least four daughters and two sons, though only two survived to adulthood. (Note: Two of their daughters, Marianna Hillary (1811) and Maria Gulielma (1813), survived less than a year.)

She died at Aldwincle rectory on 8 April 1835. Her remains lie under the altar of All Saints Church, Aldwincle.

== Poetry ==
Rolls published a number of books of poetry from 1815 to 1828. From 1817 she contributed to several periodicals, including The Literary Gazette, and The Literary Magnet. From 1828 until her death she also contributed to annuals, such as Forget-Me-Not.

== Bibliography ==
- Sacred Sketches from Scripture History (1815)
- Moscow: A Poem (1816)
- A Poetical Address to Lord Byron (1816)
- The Home of Love, a Poem (1817)
- Legends of the North, or, the Feudal Christmas; a Poem (1825)
