= William Hillary =

English soldier, author, and philanthropist (1770–1847)

Sir William Hillary
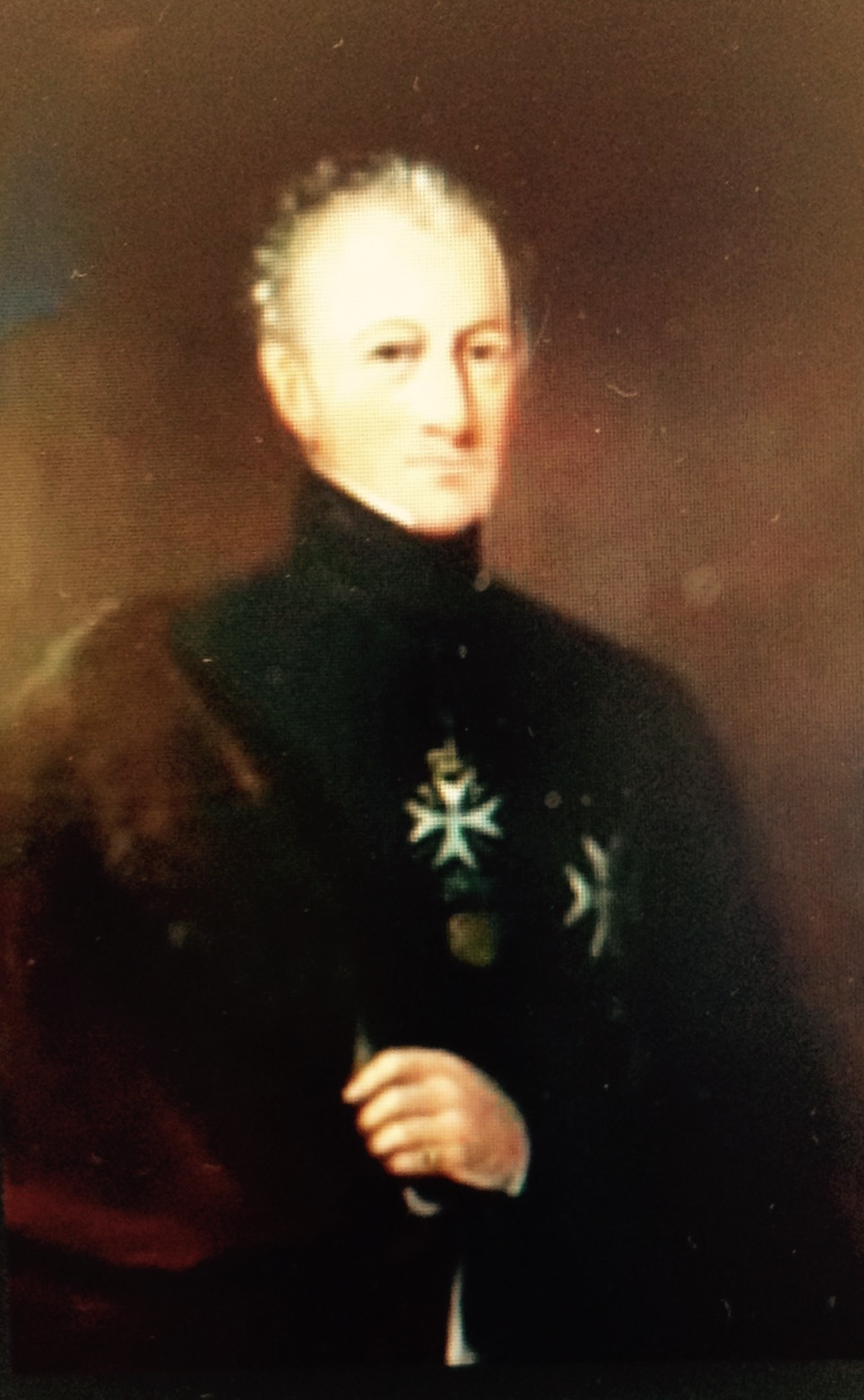
- Sir William Hillary
- Born: 4 January 1770
- Died: 5 January 1847 (aged 77); Douglas, Isle of Man
- Occupations: Soldier; Author; Philanthropist
- Known for: Founder of the Royal National Lifeboat Institution
- Spouse(s): Frances Elizabeth Disney Fytche (1st wife); Emma Tobin (2nd wife)
- Children: 2
- Relatives: Mary Rolls (sister)

Sir William Hillary, 1st Baronet (4 January 1770 – 5 January 1847) was a British militia officer, author and philanthropist, best known as the founder, in 1824, of the Royal National Lifeboat Institution.

== Life ==
Hillary's background was Quaker, from a Yorkshire family: he was the son of the merchant Richard Hillary and his wife, Hannah Wynne. He left Liverpool at age 26, and travelled to Italy. From his contacts there, he became equerry to Prince Augustus Frederick, the young son of George III, and spent two years in the post.

While Hillary was in Naples, the Prince and Sir William Hamilton sent him on a mission to Malta. There Hillary saw the election (July 1797) of the last of the Grand Masters of the Knights of Malta, Ferdinand von Hompesch zu Bolheim. On this trip he also sailed round Malta and Sicily in an open boat.

Hillary then travelled north with the incognito Prince, heading for Berlin. After a period there, he left the Prince's employ and returned to London in the autumn of 1799.

Back in England, Hillary married in 1800. He had departed from Quaker beliefs, and his wife was not a Quaker. He had been left property by John Scott, his father's business partner and nephew; and then inherited West Indian estates from his elder brother Richard, who died in 1803. He quickly dissipated a large fortune, and had to sell properties including the old Yorkshire home of Rigg House.

Hillary spent some £20,000, on creating the First Essex Legion of infantry and cavalry, recruited largely from the Dengie Hundred and present-day Maldon District areas in Essex, after the end in 1803 of the Peace of Amiens, and was given the title Lieutenant-Colonel Commandant. The force numbered 1,400. He was rewarded with a baronetcy in 1805.

After experiencing financial troubles, Hillary settled at Fort Anne near Douglas, Isle of Man in 1808.

The UCL Centre for the study of the legacies of British slavery lists Hillary as a known slave-owner in Jamaica.

== Family ==
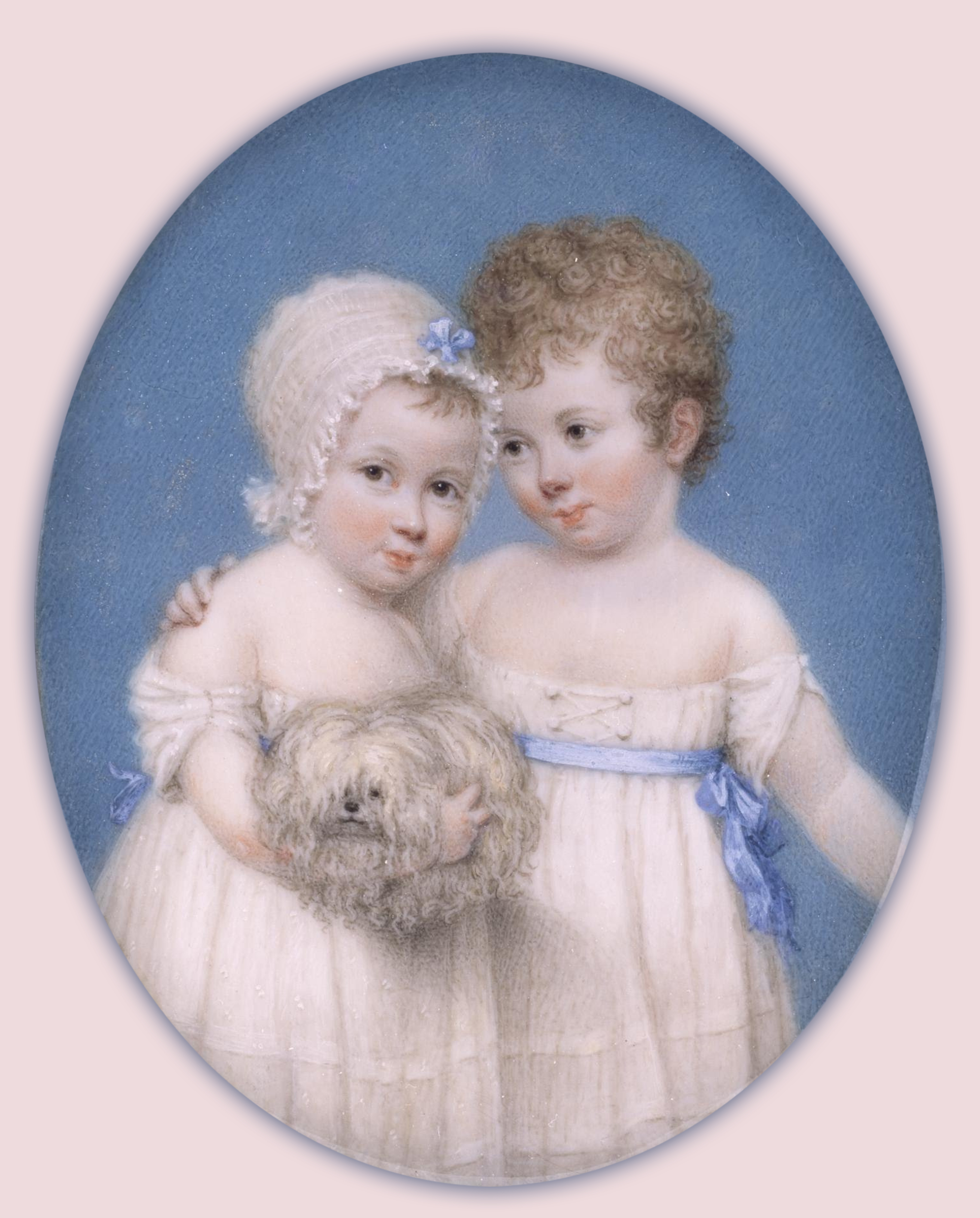
The Hillary twins, double portrait by J. T. Mitchell

=== First marriage ===
Hillary married heiress Frances Elizabeth Disney Fytche on 21 February 1800; she was the daughter of Lewis Disney Fytche (originally Lewis Disney) of Danbury Place, Essex, and his wife Elizabeth, daughter of William Fytche. In the same year, their twins were born: a son Augustus William Hillary (d. 30 December 1855), and a daughter Elizabeth Mary.

=== Circumstances of second marriage ===
In 1813, Hillary married a local Manx woman, Emma Tobin, daughter of Patrick Tobin, or Amelia Toben of Kirk Braddan, his first wife having died, according to the Oxford Dictionary of National Biography, which is however contradicted by other sources. Lady Hillary obtained a Scottish divorce from Sir William in 1812. Hillary's second marriage took place in Scotland, at Whithorn, then in Wigtonshire. Lady Hillary, divorced from her husband by 1812, continued to live at Danbury Place until her father died, when she moved to Boulogne.

=== After 1813 ===
Of the twin children:

- Elizabeth Mary married Christopher Richard Preston, of Jericho House, Blackmore, Essex, in 1818. Their son hyphenated his last name, becoming Charles Ernest Richard Preston-Hillary.
- Augustus William joined the 6th Dragoon Guards, and became 2nd baronet on his father's death. In 1829 he married Susan Curwen Christian, the eldest daughter of John Christian of Ewanrigg or Unnerigg Hall, Cumberland.

Elizabeth Mary in later life stayed with her mother. Augustus William spent time with his father; he was childless.

According to Mary Hopkirk, writing in the Essex Review, Lady Hillary continued to live at Danbury Place until her father's death, in 1823; at which point she moved to Boulogne. She met Frances D'Arblay in Paris in 1817, while on a continental voyage with her children. From Boulogne she moved to Blackmore, where she had property from her marriage settlement from her uncle Thomas Fytche, and a married daughter. She died in 1828.

Emma Tobin died in 1845.

== Lifeboat promoter ==
Hillary witnessed the wreck of HMS Racehorse, in 1822, only two months after he had been a participant in the rescue of HMS Vigilant. He drew up plans for a lifeboat service crewed by trained people, intended not only for the Isle of Man, but for all of the British coast. In February 1823 he published a pamphlet entitled An Appeal to the British Navy on the Humanity And Policy of Forming A National Institution for the Preservation of Lives And Property From Shipwreck. He proposed a national and voluntary organisation, and pointed out the potential of new techniques such as those introduced by William Congreve (rockets), Charles Cornwallis Dansey of the Royal Artillery (kites), Frederick Marryat (signal codes), and George William Manby (life-saving apparatus).

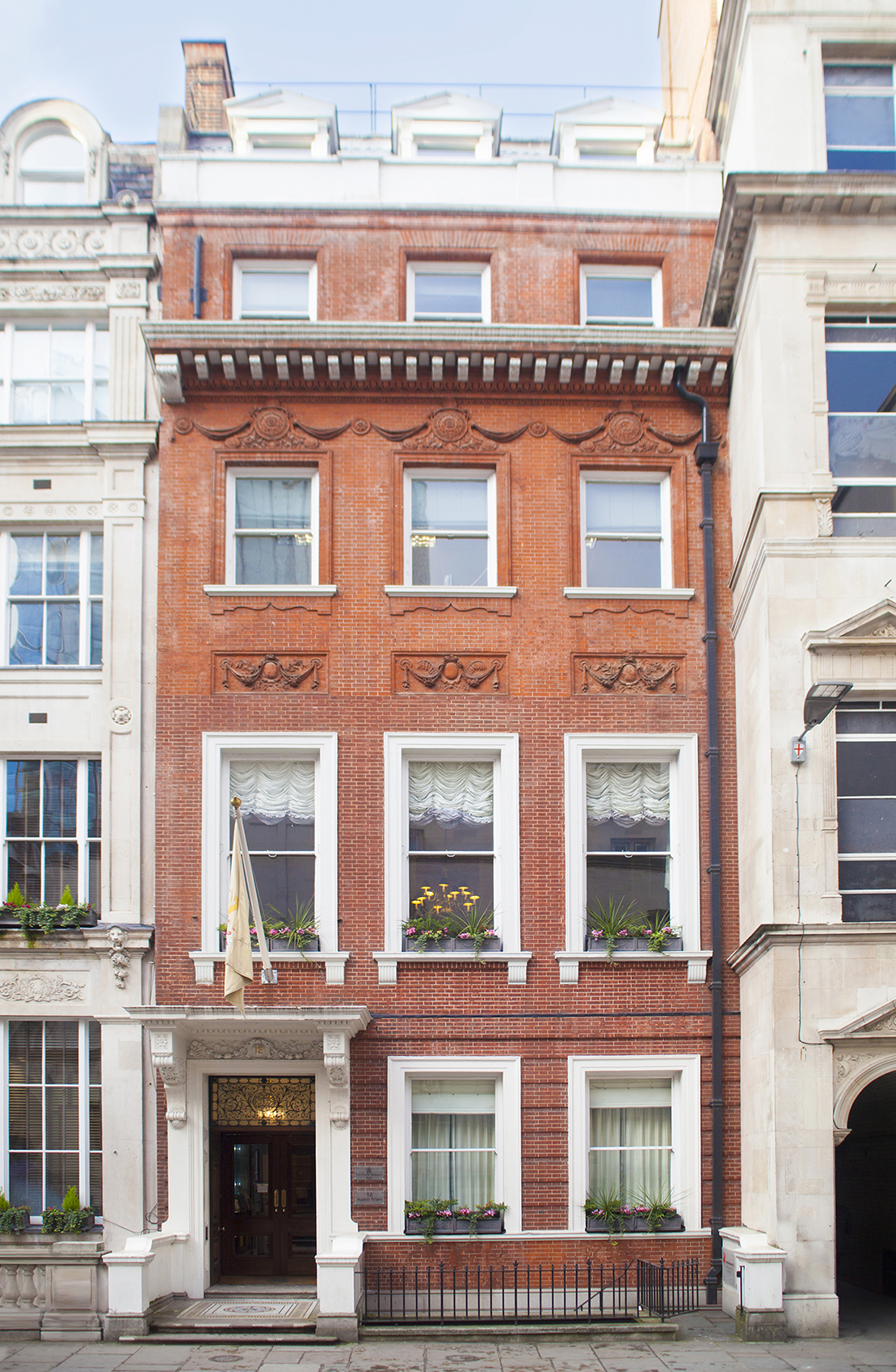
12 Austin Friars, where the first London office of the National Institution for the Preservation of Life from Shipwreck was set up in 1824

Initially Hillary received little response from the Admiralty. He appealed to London philanthropists including Thomas Wilson (MP for the City of London) and George Hibbert of the West Indies merchants, and his plans were adopted. The National Institution for the Preservation of Life from Shipwreck was founded on 4 March 1824 at a second meeting in the London Tavern, Bishopsgate Street, London, with the king as Patron. Office premises were taken at 12 Austin Friars, in the City of London, and then moved in the same area. The first of the new lifeboats to be built was stationed at Douglas.

=== St. George rescue and legacy ===
At the age of 60, Hillary took part in the rescue, in 1830, of the crew of the packet St George, which had foundered on Conister Rock at the entrance to Douglas harbour. He commanded the lifeboat, was washed overboard with others of the lifeboat crew, yet finally everyone aboard the St George was rescued with no loss of life.

Following the heroic rescue, the Master of the St George, Lieut. John Tudor (RN), wrote to Sir William expressing the gratitude of himself and his crew.

My Dear Sir – Allow me to return you (in the name of the crew of the St. George and myself) our most grateful thanks for the very great personal exertions of yourself, Lieut. Robinson (RN)., Mr William Corlett and the Life Boat's crew during the gale of yesterday morning.

I want words, Sir, to express to you what we then felt, and what we shall ever feel, for the noble and determined manner in which you persevered in coming to our assistance, after we had considered it our duty to warn you off, for, the vessel having bilged, the severity of the gale, the position of the wind, and the time of the tide, there did not appear to us (amongst the heavy breakers then rolling upon Conister) the slightest chance of escape for you, and which, from the crippled state of the life boat when she afterwards left the wreck, was so nearly proving to be the case. Trusting, Sir, that you may long live to preside over an establishment your philanthropy gave birth to, and in which your humanity has always placed you amongst the foremost and most active of its members – I have the honor to remain Your obliged, grateful, and

Most obedient servant

— Lieutenant John Tudor (RN). Douglas, November 21st, 1830.

At a Meeting of the Committee of the Isle of Man District Association of the Royal National Institution, for the Preservation of Life from Shipwreck, held at the Courthouse, Douglas, 27 November 1830, presided over by the chairman, High Bailiff James Quirk Esq, it was agreed unanimously that the following report be transmitted to the Secretary of the Royal National Institution:

That the thanks of this meeting be presented to Sir William Hillary, Lieut. Robinson, William Corlett Esq, and the crew of the life boat, for their very gallant and meritorious exertions in saving the lives of the crew of the St. George.

For the saving of the 22 crew members on board the St. George, Sir William and Lieut. Robinson both received the Institution's Gold Medal (the second of three Sir William was to receive). William Corlett and Issac Vondy both received Silver Medals with a purse of 20 guineas also distributed to the crew in recognition of their gallantry.

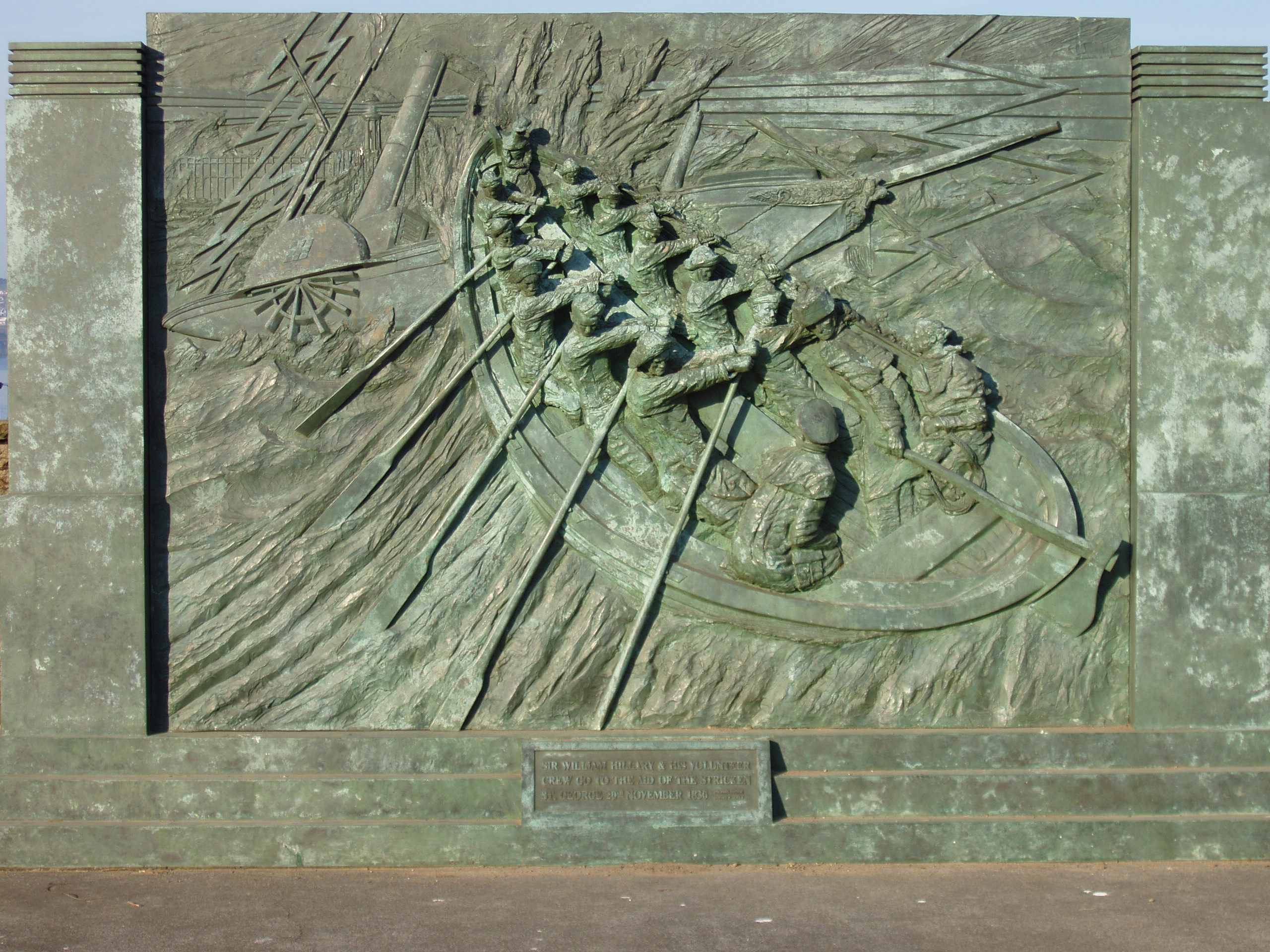
Memorial erected along the Loch Promenade in Douglas recounting the rescue of the crew of the St George

=== Tower of Refuge ===
The incident prompted Hillary to set up a scheme to build the Tower of Refuge on Conister Rock. The structure, designed by architect John Welch, was completed in 1832 and still stands at the entrance to Douglas harbour; it was the subject of a poem by William Wordsworth.

=== Douglas Breakwater ===
As well as the Tower of Refuge, Hillary was instrumental in recommendations for the construction of a Breakwater at Douglas, to afford the harbour greater shelter and to provide a haven to ships plying the Irish Sea. Hillary had written a paper on the proposal before 1835, when formal proposals were put forward, and design plans drawn up by Sir John Rennie. Construction was long delayed, and it was not until 1862 when work finally started.

== Smelt Monument ==
Following the death of Lieutenant Governor Cornelius Smelt in 1832, Sir William was instrumental in the erection of a monument commemorating Governor Smelt. The Smelt Monument was designed by John Welch and is situated in the market square, Castletown, Isle of Man, facing Castle Rushen.

== Knight Hospitaller ==
Hillary belonged to the precursor in the United Kingdom of the Order of Saint John, created a Knight (K.J.J.) in 1838. This group has been described by Jonathan Riley-Smith as consisting of "romantics and fraudsters". It failed to obtain recognition from the Order of Malta (the "Sovereign Order" of which it was putatively a part, or langue), leading to a break in relations in 1858. A fresh start was made in 1871, and a Royal Charter for the new group was obtained in 1888.

Hillary was one of the founders of the Order, and pressed for Sir Sidney Smith to be given a major post. After Smith died in 1840 he took on the roles himself. He became a Knight Grand Cross (G.C.J.J.) of the order, and at the time of his death held the position of Lieutenant Turcopolier.

What Hillary envisaged was a Christian reoccupation of Palestine, led by the Order of Malta. The background was of a revolt in Syria against Ibrahim Pasha, and a British naval intervention under Charles Napier on behalf of the Ottoman Empire in 1840, leading to the occupation of Beirut and Acre. Illness confined Hillary to his home on the Isle of Man, and in 1841 he began to sell off his possessions; but he kept up a correspondence on his ideas with Sir Richard Broun, 8th Baronet, secretary of the order.

Hillary wrote on the project in the Morning Herald for 25 November 1841, as an "Address", published also as a pamphlet. Hopes were placed in a German translation of the pamphlet by Robert Lucas Pearsall of the Order, in Karlsruhe. When Frederick William IV of Prussia indicated that the concept of a sovereign state under the order was unacceptable, the idea had to be dropped, though a similar plan in Algeria was mooted in 1846.

== Death and burial ==
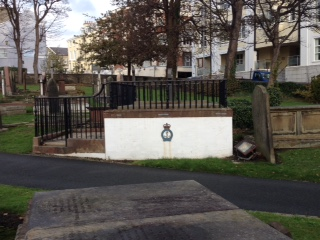
Tomb of Sir William Hillary, St George's Churchyard, Douglas, Isle of Man

Hillary died at Woodville, near Douglas, Isle of Man, on 5 January 1847. He was buried in St. George's Churchyard, Douglas.

== Memorials and awards ==
Sir William Hillary Statue. Douglas Head, Isle of Man

Sir William Hillary Statue. Douglas Head, Isle of Man

There are three memorials to Sir William Hillary in Douglas, Isle of Man:

- Sunken Gardens, Loch Promenade, with inscription.
- St George's Church, with inscription added at the time of restoration by the RNLI, after World War I
- Douglas Head, with inscription.

In his lifetime, Hillary was awarded a gold medal by the Institution he had founded, in 1824. In 1825, he suggested his part in the wreck of the City of Glasgow (see List of shipwrecks in 1825) merited a further award; but was rebuffed. Further awards were made to him in 1828, for aid to the Fortrondoert, and in 1830. In 1938, the king, George VI, asked for a modification of the original RNLI medal by William Wyon, from 1824. The obverse from that time onwards had shown the head of the sovereign; but it was then replaced by Hillary's head, as founder, engraved by Allan G. Wyon.

== Works ==
- Appeal to the British nation, on the humanity and policy of forming a national institution, for the preservation of lives and property from shipwreck (1823)
- Plan for the construction of a steam life boat: also for the extinguishment of fire at sea, &c. (1825)
- Suggestions for the improvement and embellishment of the metropolis (1825), proposing a metropolitan board for London
- A Sketch of Ireland in 1824 (2nd edition 1825)
- The National Importance of a Great Central Harbour for the Irish Sea, accessible at all times to the largest vessels proposed to be constructed at Douglas, Isle of Man (1826)
- A Letter to the Trustees of the Academic Fund (1830)
- Observations on the Proposed Changes in the Fiscal and Navigation Laws of the Isle of Man addressed to the Delegates from that Island to His Majesty's Government (1837)
- The Naval Ascendancy of Britain (1838)
- A Letter to the Shipping and Commercial Interests of Liverpool on Steam Life and Pilot Boats (1839)
- Suggestions for the Christian Occupation of the Holy Land, as a Sovereign State, by the Order of St. John of Jerusalem (1840)
- An Address to the Knights of St John of Jerusalem, on the Christian Occupation of the Holy Land, as a Sovereign State under their Dominion (1841)
- A Letter to the Right Honourable Lord John Russell, Her Majesty's Secretary of State for the Home Department, on the Preservation of Life from Shipwreck (1842)
- A Report of Proceedings at a Public Meeting held at the Court House, Douglas (1842)
- The National Importance of a Great Central Harbour of Refuge for the Irish Sea, proposed to be constructed at Douglas Bay, Isle of Man (4th edition 1842)

== Notes and references ==
Baronetage of the United Kingdom
New creation	Baronet (of Danbury Place); 1805–1847	Succeeded by Augustus Hillary
