= William Hillary (physician) =

English physician

William Hillary M.D. (1697–1763) was an English physician, known as an author on tropical diseases.

== Life ==
Hillary's background was a Quaker family in Wensleydale, Yorkshire. He had six sisters as well as an older brother Isaac, and a younger brother Richard. Hillary was a pupil of Hermann Boerhaave at Leyden University, where he graduated M.D. in 1722, writing a dissertation on intermittent fevers. He began in medical practice at Ripon, moving to Bath, Somerset in 1734, and to Barbados in 1752. He returned to London in 1758, where he died 22 April 1763.

== Works ==
Hillary was an observer of the weather and prevalent diseases. His records began at Ripon in 1726, a year in advance of the corresponding work by Clifton Wintringham senior at York. They resumed in Barbados, and continued until he left the colony, 30 May 1758. The first series was published in the appendix to his second edition of Rational and Mechanical Essay on the Small-pox, London, 1740; 1st edition, London, 1735. The Barbados records are given in his major work Observations on the Changes of the Air, and the Concomitant Epidemical Diseases in the Island of Barbados, to which is added a Treatise on the Bilious Remittent Fever … (yellow fever), London, 1759. It contains the first description of tropical sprue.

Other writings were:

- An Enquiry into the … Medicinal Virtues of Lincomb Spaw Water, near Bath, London, 1743.
- The Nature, Properties, and Laws of Motion of Fire, London, 1759.
- The Means of Improving Medical Knowledge, London, 1761.

== Notes ==
Attribution

This article incorporates text from a publication now in the public domain: Stephen, Leslie; Lee, Sidney, eds. (1891). "Hillary, William". Dictionary of National Biography. Vol. 26. London: Smith, Elder & Co.
