= Susan Lederer =

American historian of science (born 1955)

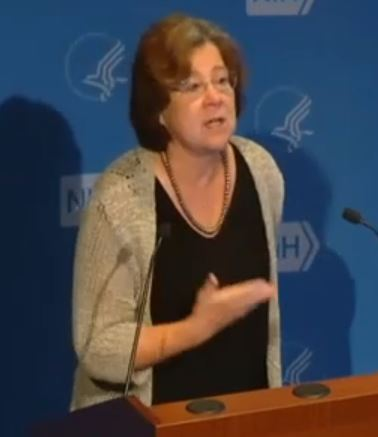
- Born: 1955 (age 70–71)

Academic background
- Education: Johns Hopkins University (BA); University of Wisconsin–Madison (MA, PhD)
- Thesis: Human experimentation and antivivisection in turn-of-the-century America (1987)
- Doctoral advisor: Ronald Numbers

Academic work
- Discipline: History of science, bioethics
- Institutions: University of Wisconsin–Madison

Susan E. Lederer (born 1955) is an American historian of science. She is the Robert Turell Professor of Medical History and Bioethics at the University of Wisconsin–Madison. Lederer focuses on medicine and American society in the 20th-century. This includes the areas of race, medicine, public health, popular culture, research ethics, and the history of medical ethics. Lederer completed a B.A. in the history of science at Johns Hopkins University in 1977. She completed an M.A. (1979) and Ph.D. (1987) in the history of science at University of Wisconsin–Madison. Lederer's dissertation was titled Human experimentation and antivivisection in turn-of-the-century America. Her advisor was Ronald Numbers.

== Selected works ==
=== Books ===
- Lederer, Susan E. (1997). Subjected to science: human experimentation. The Johns Hopkins University Press. ISBN 0801857090. OCLC 868311211.
- Lederer, Susan E. (2008). Flesh and Blood: Organ Transplantation and Blood Transfusion in 20th Century America. Oxford University Press. ISBN 9780195161502. OCLC 897033628.
