= Tropical sprue =

- Other names: Postinfectious tropical malabsorption
- Specialty: Gastroenterology
- Symptoms: Diarrhoea, abdominal pain, weight loss
- Complications: Malabsorption, anaemia
- Diagnostic method: Intestinal histology
- Differential diagnosis: Coeliac disease, environmental enteropathy
- Treatment: Antibiotics, folate replacement

Tropical sprue is a malabsorption disease commonly found in tropical regions, marked with abnormal flattening of the villi and inflammation of the lining of the small intestine. It differs significantly from coeliac sprue. It appears to be a more severe form of environmental enteropathy.

== Signs and symptoms ==
The illness usually starts with an attack of acute diarrhoea, fever and malaise following which, after a variable period, the patient settles into the chronic phase of diarrhoea, steatorrhoea, weight loss, anorexia, malaise, and nutritional deficiencies. The symptoms of tropical sprue are:

- Diarrhoea
- Steatorrhoea or fatty stool (often foul-smelling and whitish in colour)
- Indigestion
- Cramps
- Weight loss and malnutrition
- Fatigue

Left untreated, nutrient and vitamin deficiencies may develop in patients with tropical sprue. These deficiencies may have these symptoms:

- Vitamin A deficiency: hyperkeratosis or skin scales
- Vitamin B_{12} and folic acid deficiencies: anaemia, numbness, and tingling sensation
- Vitamin D and calcium deficiencies: spasm, bone pain, muscle weakness
- Vitamin K deficiency: bruises

== Cause ==
The cause of tropical sprue is not known. It may be caused by persistent bacterial, viral, amoebal, or parasitic infections. Folic acid deficiency, effects of malabsorbed fat on intestinal motility, and persistent small intestinal bacterial overgrowth may combine to cause the disorder. A link between small intestinal bacterial overgrowth and tropical sprue has been proposed to be involved in the etiology of post-infectious irritable bowel syndrome (IBS). Intestinal immunologic dysfunction, including deficiencies in secretory immunoglobulin A (IgA), may predispose people to malabsorption and bacterial colonization, so tropical sprue may be triggered in susceptible individuals following an acute enteric infection.

== Diagnosis ==
Diagnosis of tropical sprue can be complicated because many diseases have similar symptoms. The following investigation results are suggestive:

- Abnormal flattening of villi and inflammation of the lining of the small intestine, observed during an endoscopic procedure.
- Presence of inflammatory cells (most often lymphocytes) in the biopsy of small intestine tissue.
- Low levels of vitamins A, B_{12}, E, D, and K, as well as serum albumin, calcium, and folate, revealed by a blood test.
- Excess fat in the feces (steatorrhoea).
- Thickened small bowel folds seen on imaging.

Tropical sprue is largely limited to within about 30 degrees north and south of the equator. Recent travel to this region is a key factor in diagnosing this disease in residents of countries outside of that geographical region.

Other conditions which can resemble tropical sprue need to be differentiated. Coeliac disease (also known as coeliac sprue or gluten sensitive enteropathy), has similar symptoms to tropical sprue, with the flattening of the villi and small intestine inflammation and is caused by an autoimmune disorder in genetically susceptible individuals triggered by ingested gluten. Malabsorption can also be caused by protozoan infections, tuberculosis, HIV/AIDS, immunodeficiency, chronic pancreatitis and inflammatory bowel disease. Environmental enteropathy is a less severe, subclinical condition similar to tropical sprue.

== Prevention ==
Preventive measures for visitors to tropical areas where the condition exists include steps to reduce the likelihood of gastroenteritis. These may comprise using only bottled water for drinking, brushing teeth, and washing food, and avoiding fruits washed with tap water (or consuming only peeled fruits, such as bananas and oranges). Basic sanitation is necessary to reduce fecal-oral contamination and the impact of environmental enteropathy in the developing world.

== Treatment ==
Once diagnosed, tropical sprue can be treated by a course of the antibiotic tetracycline or sulphamethoxazole/trimethoprim (co-trimoxazole) for 3 to 6 months. Supplementation of vitamins B_{12} and folic acid improves appetite and leads to a gain in weight.

== Prognosis ==
The prognosis for tropical sprue may be excellent after treatment. It usually does not recur in people who get it during travel to affected regions. The recurrence rate for natives is about 20%, but another study showed changes can persist for several years.

== Epidemiology ==
Tropical sprue is common in the Caribbean, Central and South America, and India and southeast Asia. In the Caribbean, it appeared to be more common in Puerto Rico and Haiti. Epidemics in southern India have occurred.

== History ==
The disease was first described by William Hillary in 1759 in Barbados. Tropical sprue was responsible for one-sixth of all casualties sustained by the Allied forces in India and Southeast Asia during World War II. The use of folic acid and vitamin B_{12} in the treatment of tropical sprue was promoted in the late 1940s by Dr. Tom Spies of the University of Alabama, while conducting his research in Cuba and Puerto Rico.
