= Pub =

Establishment that serves alcoholic drinks

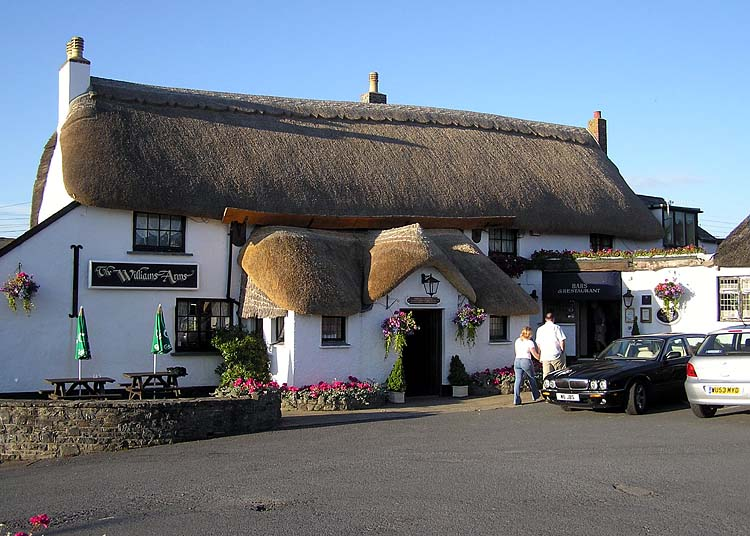
A thatched country pub, the Williams Arms, near Braunton, Devon, England

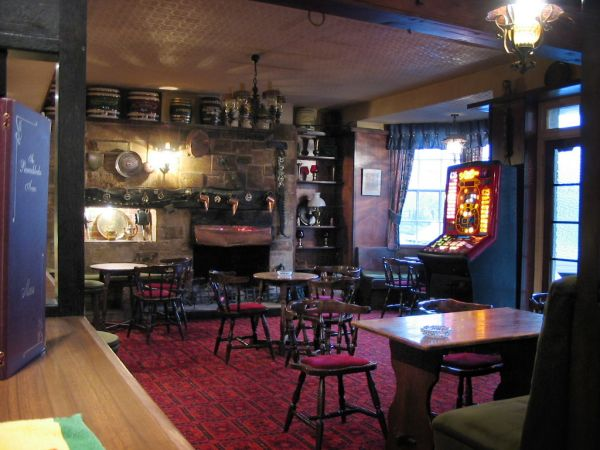
The interior of a typical British pub

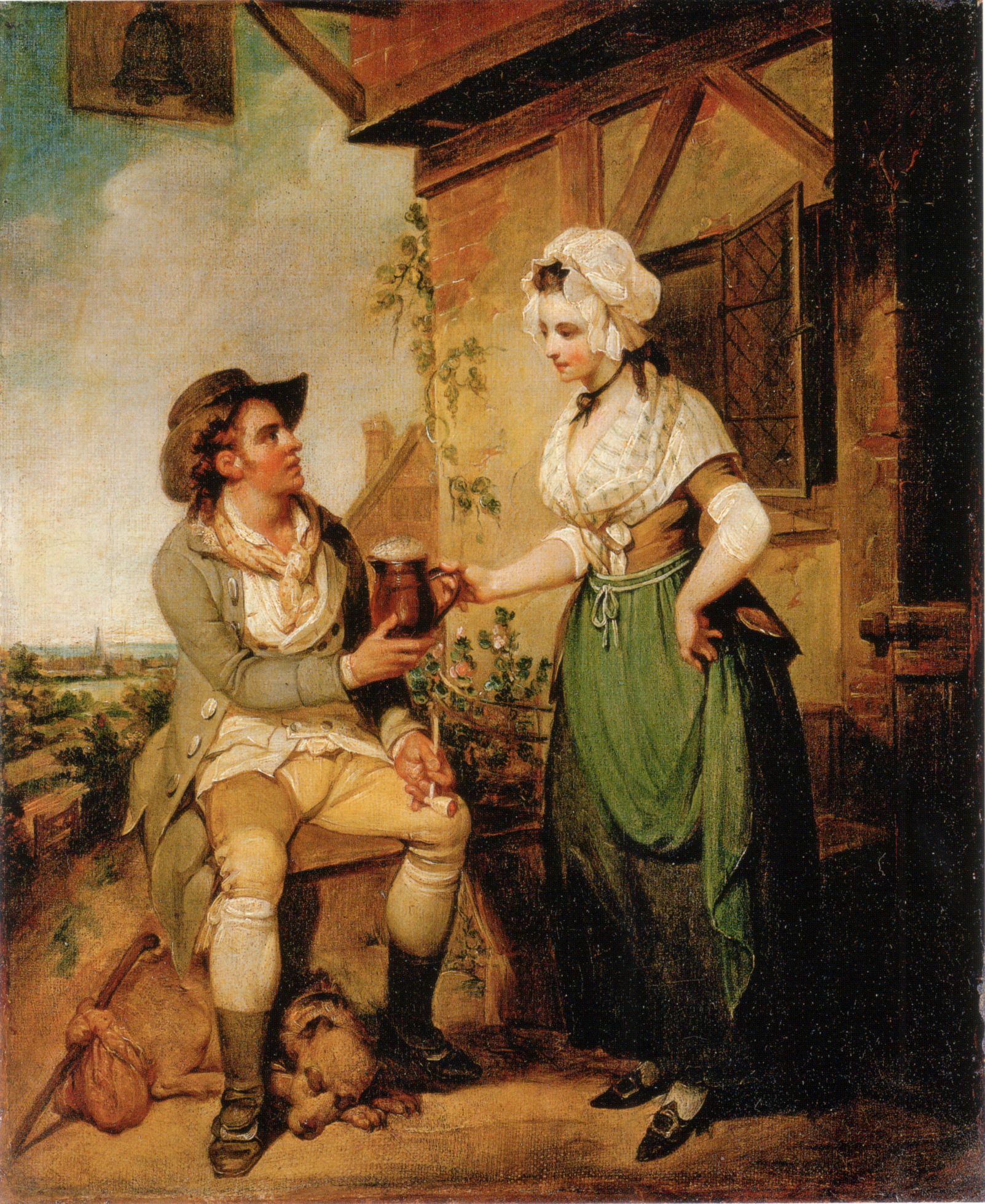
The Ale-House Door (painting of c. 1790 by Henry Singleton)

A pub (short for public house) is, in several countries, a drinking establishment licensed to serve alcoholic drinks for consumption on the premises. The term first appeared in England in the late 17th century to differentiate private houses from those open to the public as alehouses, taverns, and inns. Today, there is no strict definition, but the Campaign for Real Ale states a pub has four characteristics:

1. is open to the public without membership or residency
2. serves draught beer or cider without requiring food be consumed
3. has at least one indoor area not laid out for meals
4. allows drinks to be bought at a bar (i.e., not only table service)

The history of pubs can be traced to taverns in Roman Britain, and through Anglo-Saxon alehouses, but it was not until the early 19th century that pubs, as they are today, first began to appear. The model also became popular in countries and regions of British influence, where pubs are often still considered to be an important aspect of their culture. In many places, especially in villages, pubs are the focal point of local communities. In his 17th-century diary, Samuel Pepys described the pub as "the heart of England"; pubs have been established in other countries in modern times.

Although the drinks traditionally served include draught beer and cider, most also sell wine, spirits, tea, coffee, and soft drinks; many pubs offer meals and snacks, and those considered to be gastro-pubs serve food in a manner akin to a restaurant, and many pubs also host live music or karaoke.

A licence is required to operate a pub; the licensee is known as the landlord or landlady, or the publican. Often colloquially referred to as their "local" by regular customers, pubs are typically chosen for their proximity to home or work, good food, social atmosphere, the presence of friends and acquaintances, and the availability of pub games such as darts or pool. Pubs often screen sporting events, such as rugby, cricket and football; the pub quiz was established in the UK in the 1970s.

== History ==
=== Origins ===
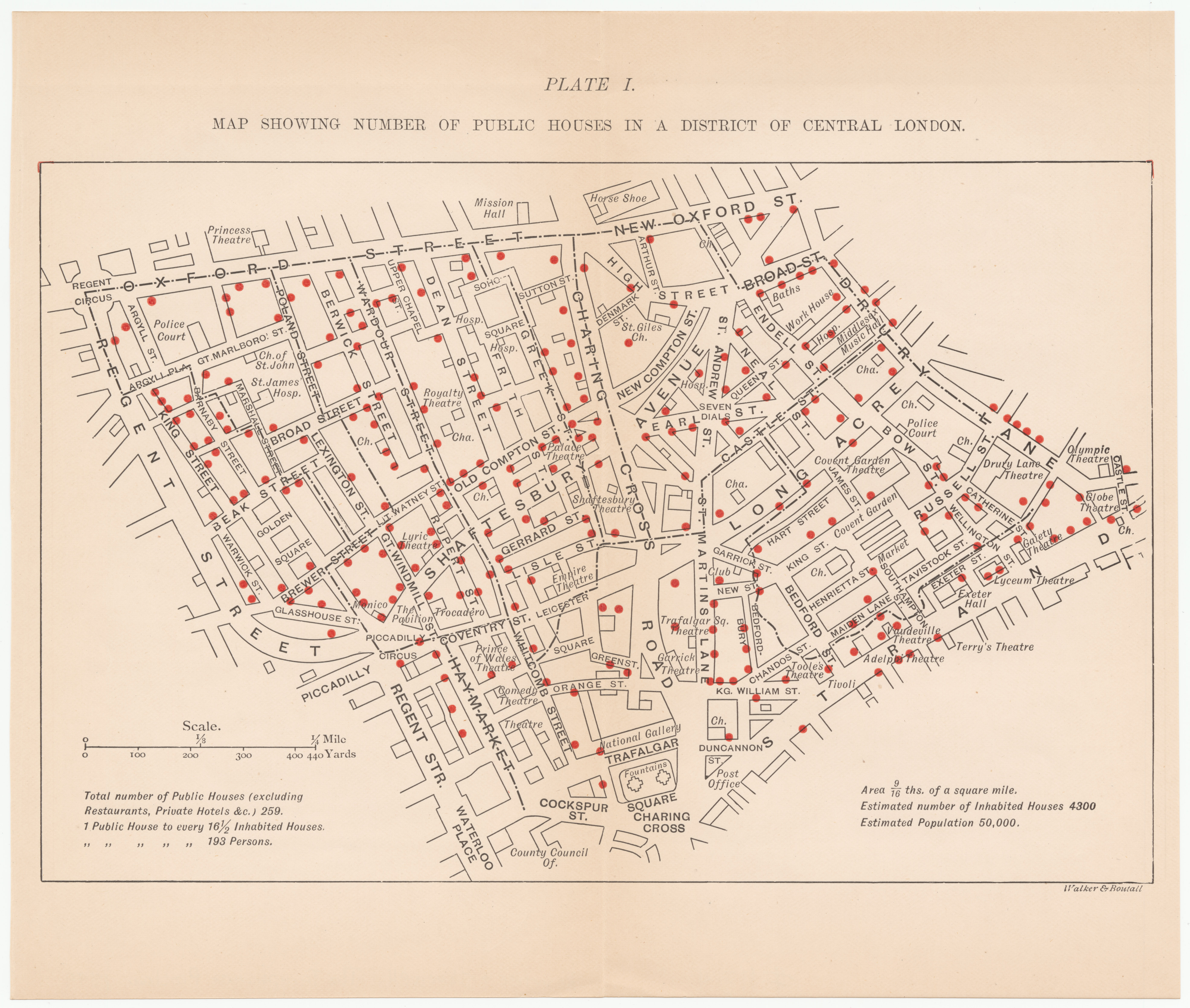
1899 map showing number of public houses in a district of central London

Ale was a native British drink before the arrival of the Roman Empire in the first century, but it was with the construction of the Roman road network that the first pubs, called tabernae (the origin of modern English "tavern"), began to appear.

After the departure of Roman authority in the fifth century and the fall of the Romano-British kingdoms, the Anglo-Saxons established alehouses that may have grown out of domestic dwellings, first attested in the 10th century. These alehouses quickly evolved into meeting houses for folk to socially congregate, gossip and arrange mutual help within their communities. The Wantage law code of Æthelred the Unready prescribes fines for breaching the peace at meetings held in alehouses.

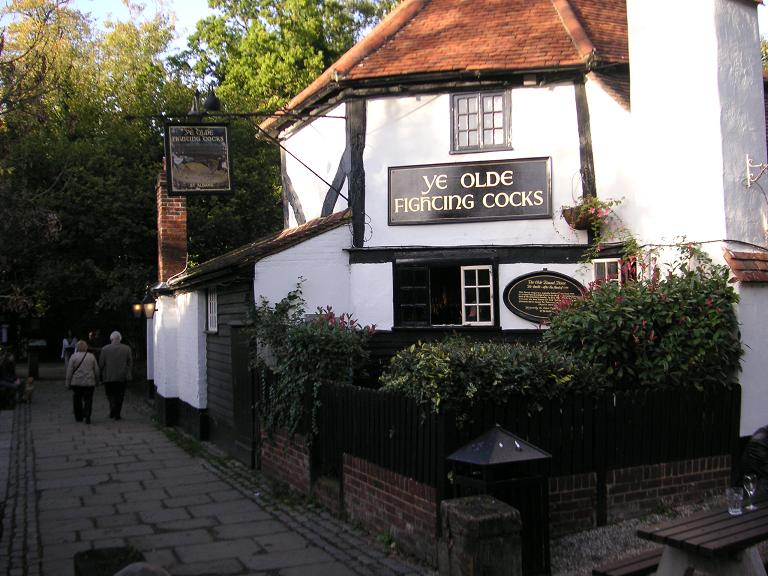
Ye Olde Fighting Cocks in St Albans, Hertfordshire, which once held the Guinness World Record for the oldest pub in England

A traveller in the early Middle Ages could obtain overnight accommodation in monasteries, but later a demand for hostelries grew with the popularity of pilgrimages and travel. The Hostellers of London were granted guild status in 1446, and in 1514 the guild became the Worshipful Company of Innholders. A survey in 1577 of drinking establishment in England and Wales for taxation purposes recorded 14,202 alehouses, 1,631 inns, and 329 taverns, representing one pub for every 187 people.

=== Inns ===
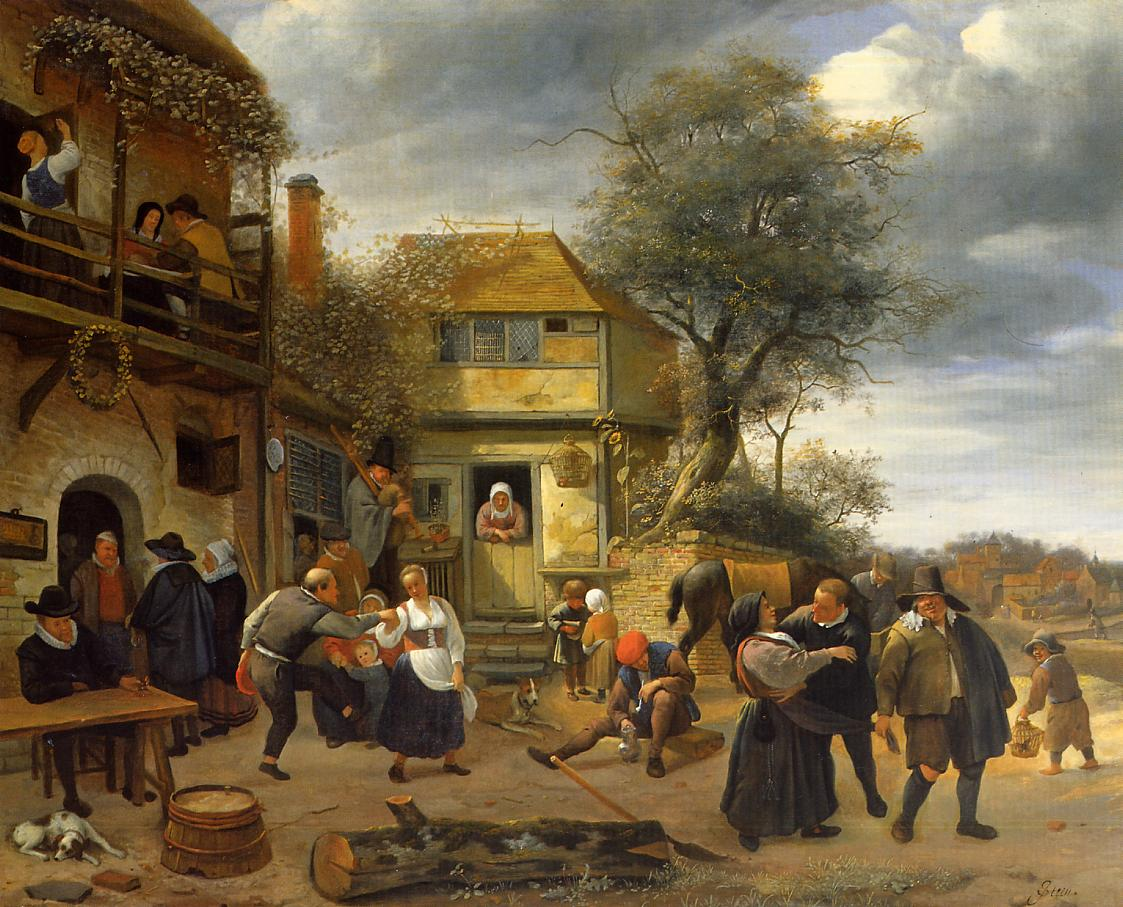
Peasants before an Inn by Dutch artist Jan Steen c. 1653

Inns are buildings where travellers can seek lodging and, usually, food and drink. They are typically located in the country or along a highway. In Europe, they possibly first sprang up when the Romans built a system of roads two millennia ago. Some inns in Europe are several centuries old. In addition to providing for the needs of travellers, inns traditionally acted as community gathering places.

In Europe, it is the provision of accommodation, if anything, that now distinguishes inns from taverns, alehouses and pubs. The latter tend to provide alcohol (and, in the UK, soft drinks and often food), but less commonly accommodation. Inns tend to be older and grander establishments: historically they provided not only food and lodging, but also stabling and fodder for travellers' horses, and on some roads fresh horses for the mail coach.

Famous London inns include the George, Southwark and the Tabard. There is, however, no longer a formal distinction between an inn and other kinds of establishment. Many pubs use "Inn" in their name, either because they are long established former coaching inns, or to summon up a particular kind of image, or in many cases simply as a pun on the word "in".

The original services of an inn are now also available at other establishments. Hotels, lodges, and motels focus more on lodging customers than on other services but usually provide meals. Pubs are primarily alcohol-serving establishments. Restaurants and taverns serve food and drink. In North America, the lodging aspect of the word "inn" lives on in hotel brand names like Holiday Inn, and in some state laws that refer to lodging operators as innkeepers.

The Inns of Court and Inns of Chancery in London started as ordinary inns where barristers met to do business, but became institutions of the legal profession in England and Wales.

=== Advent of the modern pub ===
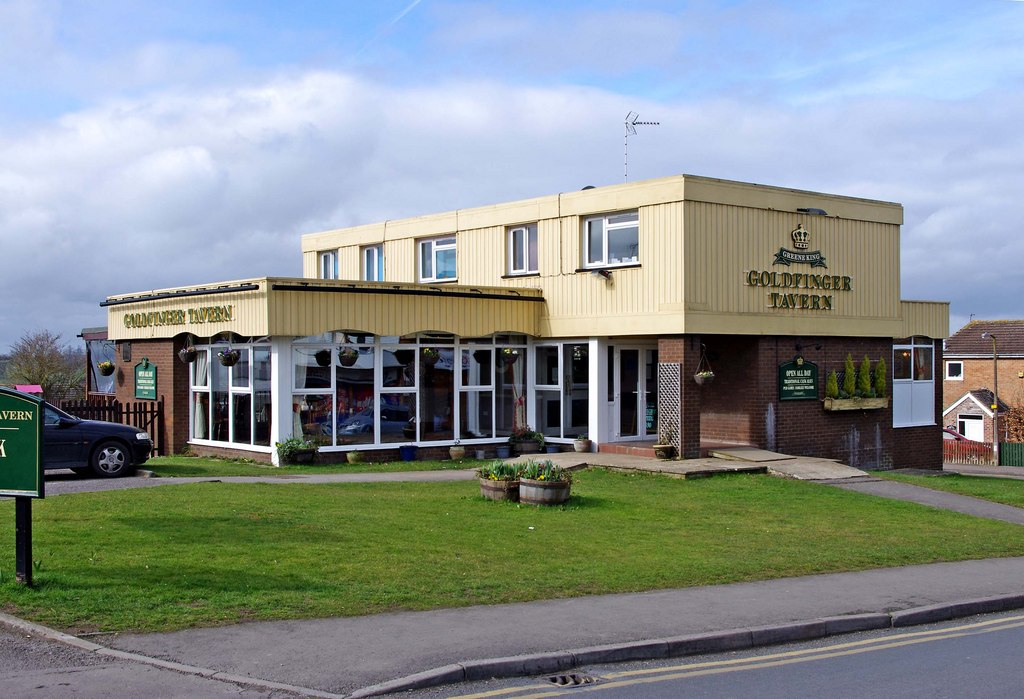
Goldfinger Tavern, Highworth, an example of a mid-20th-century flat-roofed pub

Pubs as they are known today first appeared in the 19th century. Before this time alehouses were largely indistinguishable from private houses and the poor standard of rural roads meant that, away from the larger towns, the only beer available was often brewed by the publican. With the arrival of the Industrial Revolution, many areas of the United Kingdom were transformed by a surge in industrial activity and rapid population growth. There was huge demand for beer and for venues where the public could meet but there was also intense competition for customers.

Gin houses and palaces became increasingly popular, while the Beerhouse Act 1830 caused a proliferation of beerhouses. By the mid-19th century, pubs were widely purpose-built and could incorporate architectural features that distinguished them from private houses to make them stand out from the competition. Many public houses were redeveloped at this time, borrowing features from other building types and gradually developing the characteristics that make pubs instantly recognisable today. In particular, contrary to the intentions of the Beerhouse Act, many drew inspiration from the gin houses and palaces.

Bar counters had been an early adoption but ornate mirrors, etched glass, polished brass fittings and lavishly tiled surfaces were all features that had first made their appearance in gin houses. Innovations such as the introduction of hand pumps (or beer engines) allowed more people to be served, faster, while technological advances in the brewing industry and improved transportation links made it possible for breweries to deliver beer far from where it was brewed.

=== Tied house system ===
The latter half of the 19th century saw increased competition within the brewing industry and, in an attempt to secure markets for their own products, breweries began rapidly buying local pubs and directly employing publicans to run them. Although some tied houses had existed in larger British towns since the 17th century, this represented a fundamental shift in the way that many pubs were operated and the period is now widely regarded as the birth of the tied house system.

Decreasing numbers of free houses and difficulties in obtaining new licences meant a continual expansion of their tied estates was the only feasible way for breweries to generate new trade. By the end of the century more than 90 per cent of public houses in England were owned by breweries, and the only practical way brewers could now grow their tied estates was to turn on each other. Buy-outs and amalgamations became commonplace, and by the end of the 1980s there were only six large brewers left in the UK, collectively known as the Big Six; Allied, Bass, Courage, Grand Metropolitan, Scottish & Newcastle and Whitbread.

In an attempt to increase the number of free houses, by forcing the big breweries to sell their tied houses, the government introduced the Beer Orders in 1989. The result, however, was that the Big Six melted away into other sectors; selling their brewing assets and spinning off their tied houses, largely into the hands of branded pub chains, called pubcos. As these were not brewers, they were not governed by the Beer Orders and tens of thousands of pubs remain tied, much in the same way that they had been previously. In reality, government interference did very little to improve Britain's tied house system and all its large breweries are now in the hands of foreign or multi-national companies.

=== Decline in Britain ===
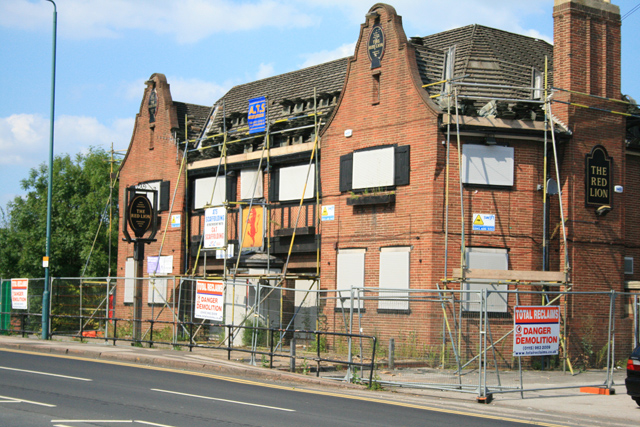
The Red Lion, a pub in Nottingham, being demolished in 2008

The number of pubs in the UK has declined year on year at least since 1982. Various reasons are put forward for this, such as the failure of some establishments to keep up with customer requirements. Others claim the smoking ban of 2007, intense competition from gastro-pubs, the availability of cheap alcohol in supermarkets or the general economic climate are either to blame, or are factors in the decline. Changes in demographics may be an additional factor. In 2015 the rate of pub closures came under the scrutiny of Parliament in the UK, with a promise of legislation to improve relations between owners and tenants. The Lost Pubs Project listed over 45,000 closed English pubs in June 2025, with photographs of over 33,000. In the fifteen years to 2017 a quarter of London's pubs had closed. The closures have been ascribed to factors such as changing tastes and a rise in the cost of beer due to tax increases. Some London boroughs where there has been an increase in British Muslim population—Islam forbids alcohol to its adherents—have seen a high amount of closures.

The industry suffered a major decline from 2020, due to reduced trade during the COVID-19 pandemic, followed by the wave of inflation that increased prices. By June 2022, pub numbers in England and Wales had fallen to a record low of 39,970, a loss of 7,000 in 10 years. Pubs also found it difficult to hire enough staff, with 142,000 jobs unfilled in the accommodation and food services sector by 2023. Figures published in 2023 showed that the rate of pub loss, equivalent to two closures a day, was increasing and that 39,404 pubs in England and Wales remained open at the end of June. The British Beer and Pub Association reported that nearly 300 pubs closed across England and Wales in 2024—the equivalent of around six per week—with the closures estimated to have cost more than 4,500 jobs. Figures published in 2026 showed the decline increasing, with the loss of 2,400 jobs in the first quarter alone.

== Licensing laws ==
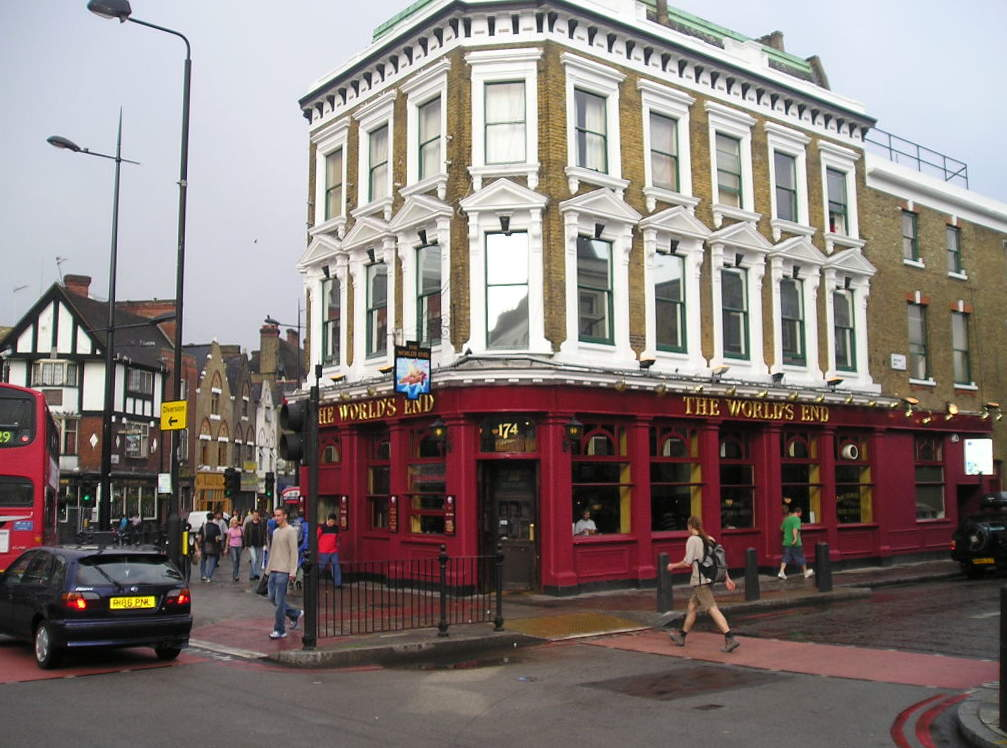
A city pub, the World's End, Camden Town, London

There was regulation of public drinking spaces in England from at least the 15th century. In 1496, under, Henry VII, an act was passed, "against vagabonds and beggers" (11 Hen. VII c2), that included a clause empowering two justices of the peace, "to rejecte and put awey comen ale-selling in tounes and places where they shall think convenyent, and to take suertie of the keepers of ale-houses in their gode behavyng by the discrecion of the seid justices, and in the same to be avysed and aggreed at the tyme of their sessions."

The Beerhouse Act of 1830 is widely considered to be a milestone in the history of public houses. Gin was popularised in England in the late 17th century, largely because it provided an alternative to French brandy at a time of political and religious conflict between Britain and France. Because of its cheapness, gin became popular with the poor, eventually leading to a period of drunkenness and lawlessness, known as the Gin Craze.

In the early 19th century, encouraged by a reduction of duties, gin consumption again began to rise and gin houses and gin palaces (an evolution of gin shops) began to spread from London to most towns and cities in Britain. Alarmed at the prospect of a return to the Gin Craze, the government attempted to counter the threat, and encourage the consumption of a more wholesome beverage, by introducing the Beerhouse Act of 1830. The Act introduced a new lower, and largely deregulated, tier of premises called "the beerhouse".

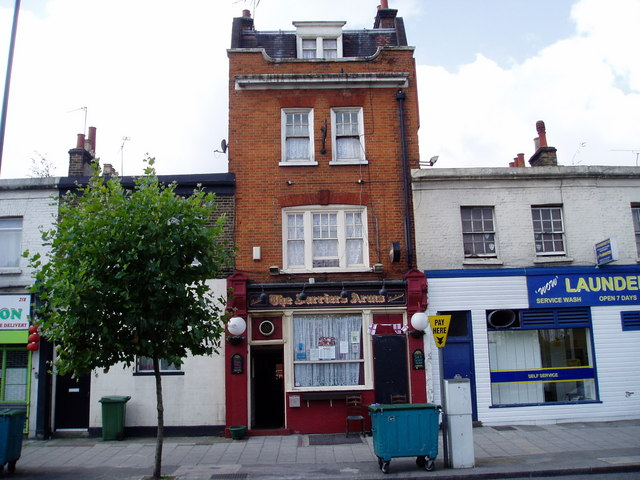
A Victorian beerhouse, now a public house, in Rotherhithe, Greater London

Under the act any householder, upon payment of two guineas (roughly equal in value to £207 today), was permitted to brew and sell beer or cider in their own home. Beerhouses were not allowed to open on Sundays, or sell spirits and fortified wines; any beerhouse discovered to be breaking these rules was closed down and the owner heavily fined.

Within eight years 46,000 new beerhouses opened and, because operating costs were so low, huge profits were often made. The combination of increasing competition and high profits eventually led to what has been described as a golden age of pub building when many landlords extended or redeveloped their properties, adopting many features modern pubs still have.

Authorities attempted to check the growth from 1869 by introducing magisterial control and new licensing laws. These aimed to make it harder to obtain a licence, and control drunkenness, prostitution, and other undesirable conduct on licensed premises.

In the United Kingdom, restrictions were tightened considerably following the advent of the First World War. The Defence of the Realm Act, along with introducing rationing and censorship of the press, restricted pubs' opening hours to 12 noon–2:30 pm and 6:30 pm–9:30 pm. Opening for the full licensed hours was compulsory, and closing time was equally firmly enforced by the police. There was also a special case established under the State Management Scheme where the brewery and licensed premises were bought and run by the state, most notably in Carlisle.

=== Lock-in ===
A "lock-in" is when a pub owner allows patrons to continue drinking in the pub after the legal closing time, on the theory that once the doors are locked, it becomes a private party rather than a pub. Patrons may put money behind the bar before official closing time, and redeem their drinks during the lock-in so no drinks are technically sold after closing time. The origin of the British lock-in was a reaction to 1915 changes in the licensing laws in England and Wales, which curtailed opening hours to stop factory workers from turning up drunk and harming the war effort. From then until the start of the 21st century, UK licensing laws changed very little, retaining these comparatively early closing times. The tradition of the lock-in therefore remained. Since the implementation of the Licensing Act 2003, premises in England and Wales may apply to extend their opening hours beyond 11 pm, allowing round-the-clock drinking and removing much of the need for lock-ins. Since the smoking ban, some establishments operated a lock-in during which the remaining patrons could smoke without repercussions but, unlike drinking lock-ins, allowing smoking in a pub was still a prosecutable offence.

== Smoking bans ==
Concerns about the effects of cigarette smoke inhalation first surfaced in the 1950s and ultimately led many countries to ban or restrict smoking in specific settings, such as pubs and restaurants. Early in 2004, Ireland became the first country in the world to ban smoking in all enclosed public areas. Scotland was the first UK nation to introduce a ban on indoor smoking in March 2006, followed by the rest of the UK in 2007. Australia introduced a similar ban in 2006 and now has some of the world's toughest anti-smoking laws, with some territories having also banned smoking in outside public areas. Some publicans raised concerns, prior to the implementation of restrictions, that a smoking ban would have a negative impact on sales. The impact of the ban was mixed, with some pubs suffering declining sales, and others seeing an increase, particularly in food sales.

== Architecture ==
=== Saloon or lounge ===
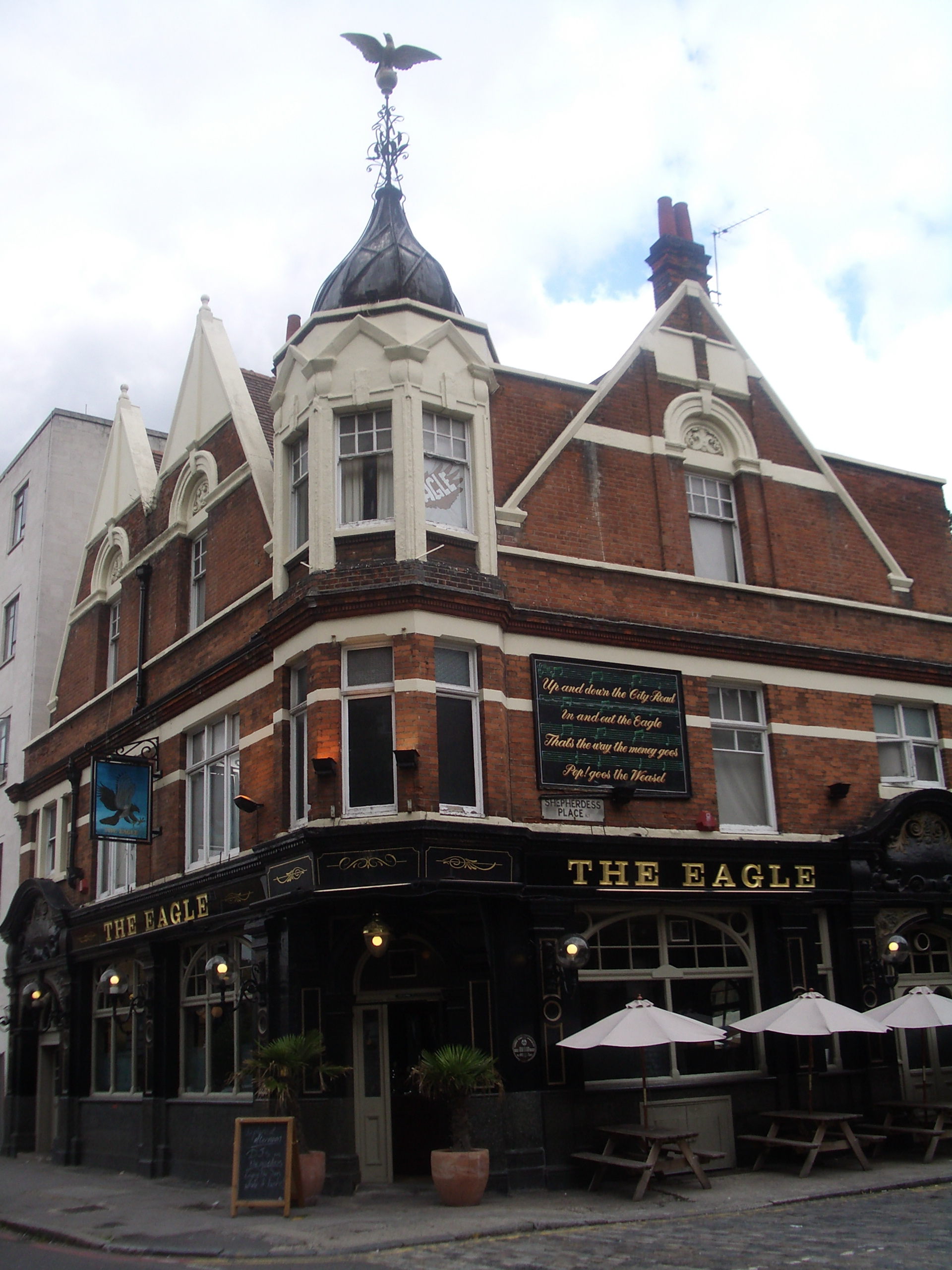
The Eagle, City Road, Islington, London, displaying the nursery rhyme line about the pub's predecessor

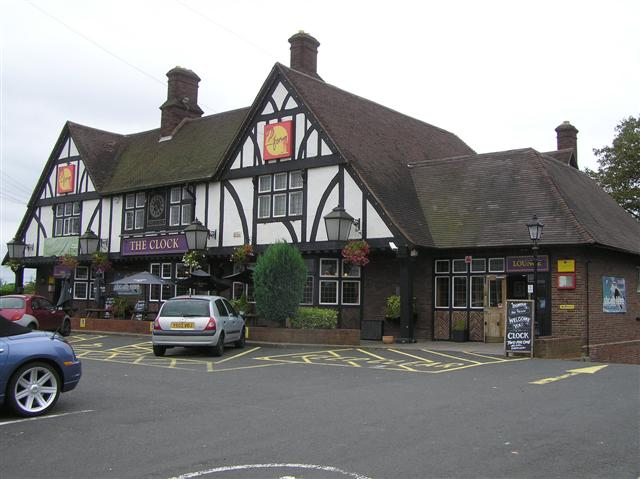
The Clock, Birmingham – an example of a mock Tudor pub, now demolished to make way for the expansion of Birmingham Airport

By the end of the 18th century, a new room in the pub was established: the saloon. Beer establishments had always provided entertainment of some sort—singing, gaming or sport. Balls Pond Road in Islington was named after an establishment run by a Mr. Ball that had a duck pond at the rear, where drinkers could, for a fee, go out and take a potshot at the ducks. More common, however, was a card room or a billiards room. The saloon was a room where, for an admission fee or a higher price of drinks, singing, dancing, drama, or comedy was performed and drinks would be served at the table. From this came the popular music hall form of entertainment—a show consisting of a variety of acts.

A most famous London saloon was the Grecian Saloon in the Eagle, City Road, referenced by name in the 18th-century nursery rhyme: "Up and down the City Road / In and out the Eagle / That's the way the money goes / Pop goes the weasel." This meant that the customer had spent all his money at the Eagle, and needed to pawn his "weasel" to get some more. The meaning of the "weasel" is unclear but the two most likely definitions are: a flat iron used for finishing clothing; or rhyming slang for a coat (weasel and stoat).

A few pubs have stage performances such as serious drama, stand-up comedy, musical bands, cabaret or striptease; however, juke boxes, karaoke and other forms of pre-recorded music have otherwise replaced the musical tradition of a piano or guitar and singing.

=== Public bar ===
The public bar, or tap room, was where the working class were expected to congregate and drink. It had unfurnished floorboards, sometimes covered with sawdust to absorb the spitting and spillages (known as "spit and sawdust"), bare bench seats and stools. Drinks were generally lower-quality beers and liquors. Public bars were seen as exclusive areas for only men; strictly enforced social etiquettes barred women from entering public bars (some pubs did not lift this rule until the 1980s). In the Manchester area, the public bar was known as the "vault", other rooms being the lounge and snug as usual elsewhere. The vault was a men-only bar, meant for working men in their dirty working clothes.

This style was in marked contrast to the adjacent saloon or lounge bar which, by the early 20th century, was where male or accompanied female middle-class drinkers would drink. It had carpeted floors, upholstered seats, and a wider selection of better quality drinks that cost a penny or two more than those served in the public bar.

By the mid-20th century, the standard of the public bar had generally improved. Many were built between the world wars as part of the "improved" pub movement and as "roadhouse" inns—with large car parks to attract passing trade. Pub patrons only had to choose between economy and exclusivity (or youth and age: a jukebox or dartboard). By the 1970s, divisions between saloons and public bars were being phased out, usually by the removal of the dividing wall or partition. While the names of saloon and public bar may still be seen on the doors of pubs, the prices (and often the standard of furnishings and decoration) are the same throughout the premises. Most present day pubs now comprise one large room, although with the advent of gastropubs, some establishments have returned to maintaining distinct rooms or areas.

=== Snug ===
The "snug" was a small private room or area, typically with access to the bar and a frosted glass window above head height. Customers in the snug paid a higher price for beer and nobody could look in and see the drinkers. Not only did wealthy visitors use these rooms, but also patrons who preferred not to be seen in the public bar. Ladies often enjoyed a private drink in the snug in a time when many frowned on women visiting a pub. The local police officer might nip in for a quiet pint, the parish priest for his evening whisky, or lovers for a rendezvous. The Campaign for Real Ale (CAMRA) has surveyed the 50,000 pubs in Britain and it believes that there are very few pubs that still have classic snugs. These are on a historic interiors list in order that they can be preserved.

=== Counter ===
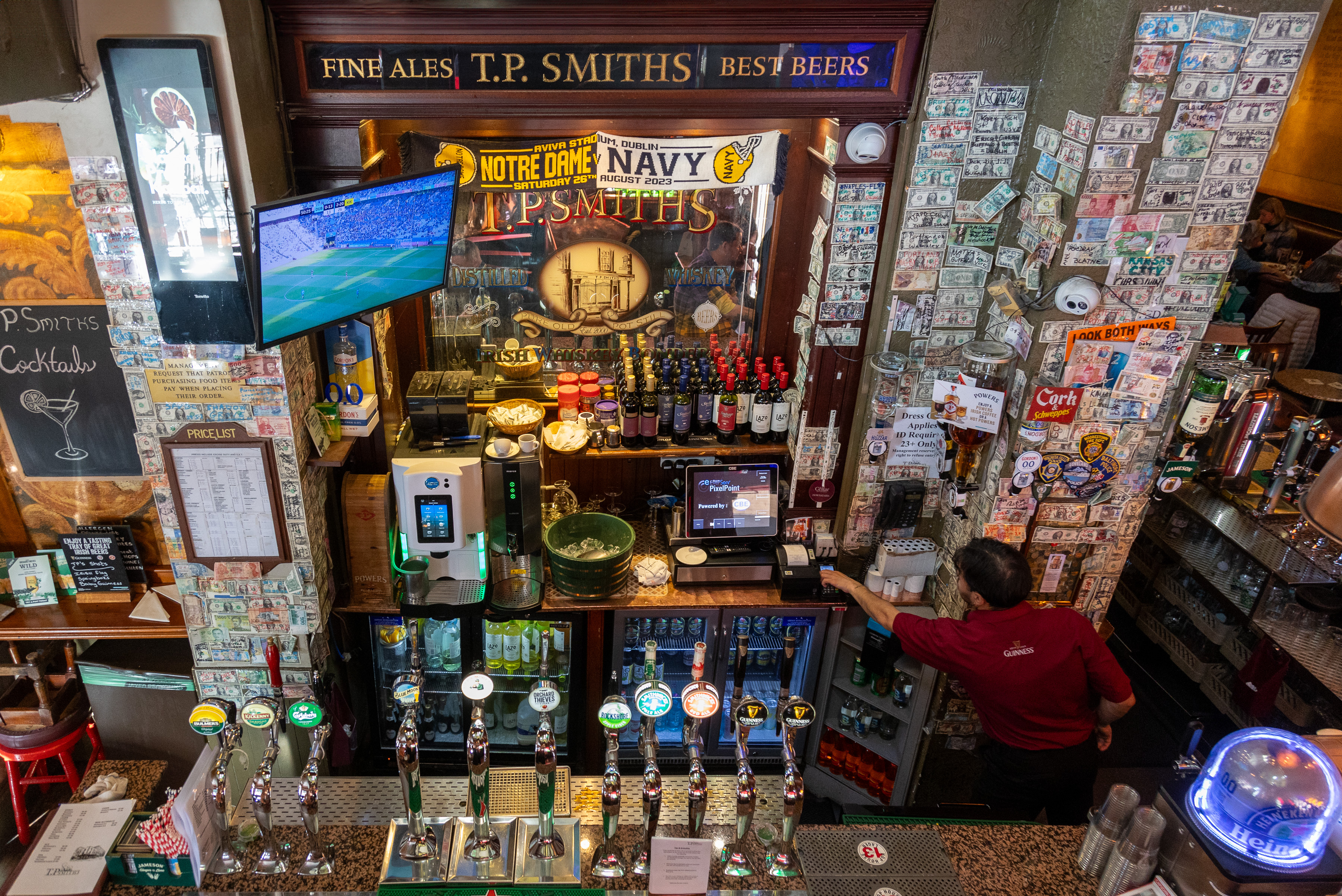
T.P. Smith's Pub, Dublin, Ireland

The pub took the concept of the bar counter to serve the beer from gin palaces in the 18th century. Until that time beer establishments used to bring the beer out to the table or benches, as remains the practice in (for example) beer gardens and some other drinking establishments in Germany. A bar might be provided for the manager or publican to do paperwork while keeping an eye on his or her customers, and the term "bar" applied to the publican's office where one was built, but beer would be tapped directly from a cask or barrel on a table, or kept in a separate taproom and brought out in jugs.

When purpose built Victorian pubs were built after the Beerhouse Act 1830, the main room was the public room with a large serving bar copied from the gin houses, the idea being to serve the maximum number of people in the shortest possible time. The other, more private, rooms had no serving bar—they had the beer brought to them from the public bar. A number of pubs in the Midlands or the North still retain this set up, though now customers fetch the drinks themselves from the taproom or public bar. One of these is the Vine, known locally as the Bull and Bladder, in Brierley Hill near Birmingham, another the Cock at Broom, Bedfordshire a series of small rooms served drinks and food by waiting staff. By the early 1970s there was a tendency to change to one large drinking room as breweries were eager to invest in interior design and theming.

Isambard Kingdom Brunel, the British engineer and railway builder, introduced the idea of a circular bar into the Swindon station pub in order that customers were served quickly and did not delay his trains. These island bars became popular as they also allowed staff to serve customers in several different rooms surrounding the bar.

=== Beer engine ===
A "beer engine" is a device for pumping beer, originally manually operated and typically used to dispense beer from a cask or container in a pub's basement or cellar.

The first beer pump known in England is believed to have been invented by John Lofting, a Dutch-born, London-based inventor, manufacturer, and merchant, in the late 1680s or early 1690s. The London Gazette of 17 March 1691 published a patent in favour of John Lofting for a fire engine, but remarked upon and recommended another invention of his, for a beer pump:

"Whereas their Majesties [i.e., William III of England and Mary II of England] have been Graciously Pleased to grant Letters patent to John Lofting of London Merchant for a New Invented Engine for Extinguishing Fires which said Engine have found every great encouragement. The said Patentee hath also projected a Very Useful Engine for starting of beer and other liquors which will deliver from 20 to 30 barrels an hour which are completely fixed with Brass Joints and Screws at Reasonable Rates. Any Person that hath occasion for the said Engines may apply themselves to the Patentee at his house near St Thomas Apostle London or to Mr. Nicholas Wall at the Workshoppe near Saddlers Wells at Islington or to Mr. William Tillcar, Turner, his agent at his house in Woodtree next door to the Sun Tavern London."

A further engine was invented in the late 18th century by the locksmith and hydraulic engineer Joseph Bramah (1748–1814).

Strictly the term refers to the pump itself, which is normally manually operated, though electrically powered and gas powered pumps are occasionally used. When manually powered, the term "handpump" is often used to refer to both the pump and the associated handle.

== Companies ==
In the 18th century, after the development of the large London porter breweries, a trend grew for pubs to become tied houses that only sold beer from a single brewery. (A pub not 'tied' in this way was called a free house.) The usual arrangement for a tied house was that the brewery owned the pub but rented it out to a private individual (landlord) who ran it as a separate business (even though contracted to buy the beer from the brewery). Another common arrangement was (and is) for the landlord to own the premises (whether freehold or leasehold) independently of the brewer, but then to take a mortgage loan from a brewery, either to finance the purchase of the pub initially, or to refurbish it, and be required as a term of the loan to observe the solus tie.

In the late 20th century, breweries increasingly ran their pubs directly, using managers rather than tenants. Most such breweries, such as the regional brewery Shepherd Neame in Kent and Young's and Fuller's in London, control hundreds of pubs in a particular region of the UK, while a few, such as Greene King, are spread nationally. The landlord of a tied pub may be an employee of the brewery—in which case, they are a manager of a managed house—or a self-employed tenant under a lease agreement with a brewery that obligates (trade tie) them to purchase only that brewery's beer. The beer selection is mainly limited to beers brewed by that particular company. The Beer Orders, passed in 1989, were aimed at getting tied houses to offer at least one alternative beer, known as a guest beer, from another brewery. This law has now been repealed but while in force it dramatically altered the industry. Some pubs still offer a regularly changing selection of guest beers.

Organisations such as Wetherspoons, Punch Taverns and O'Neill's were formed in the UK in the wake of the Beer Orders. A PubCo is a company involved in the retailing but not the manufacture of beverages, while a Pub chain may be run either by a PubCo or by a brewery. In 2016, a number of the largest PubCo's were regulated, and tied tenants in England and Wales got new statutory rights to go free of tie or to have disputes heard by the Pubs Code Adjudicator.

Pubs within a chain usually have items in common—such as fittings, promotions, ambience, and food and drink menu. A pub chain positions itself in the marketplace for a target clientele. One company may run several pub chains aimed at different segments of the market. Pubs for use in a chain are bought and sold in large units, often from regional breweries that then close down. Newly acquired pubs are often renamed by the new owners, and many people resent the loss of traditional names, especially if their favourite regional beer disappears at the same time.

In 2009 about half of Britain's pubs were owned by large pub companies.

=== Brewery tap ===
A brewery tap, also called a brewpub or taproom, is the nearest outlet for a brewery's beers. It is usually a room or bar in the brewery itself, although the name may be applied to a nearby pub.

== Types ==
A pub has no strict definition, but CAMRA states that a pub has four characteristics:

1. Open to the public without membership / residency
2. Serve draught beer or cider without requiring food be consumed
3. Have at least one indoor area not laid out for meals
4. Allow drinks to be bought at a bar (i.e. not only table service)

Together these characteristics differentiate pubs from restaurants and hotel bars, although some pubs also serve as restaurants or hotels.

=== Gastropub ===
A gastropub is a hybrid pub and restaurant, notable for serving good quality beer, wine and food. The name is a portmanteau of "gastronomy" and "public house", and was coined in 1991 when David Eyre and Mike Belben took over the Eagle pub in Clerkenwell, London. The concept of a restaurant in a pub reinvigorated both pub culture and British dining, though it has also attracted criticism for potentially removing the character of traditional pubs.

In 2011, The Good Food Guide suggested that the term has become irrelevant such is its commonality these days.

=== Country pub ===
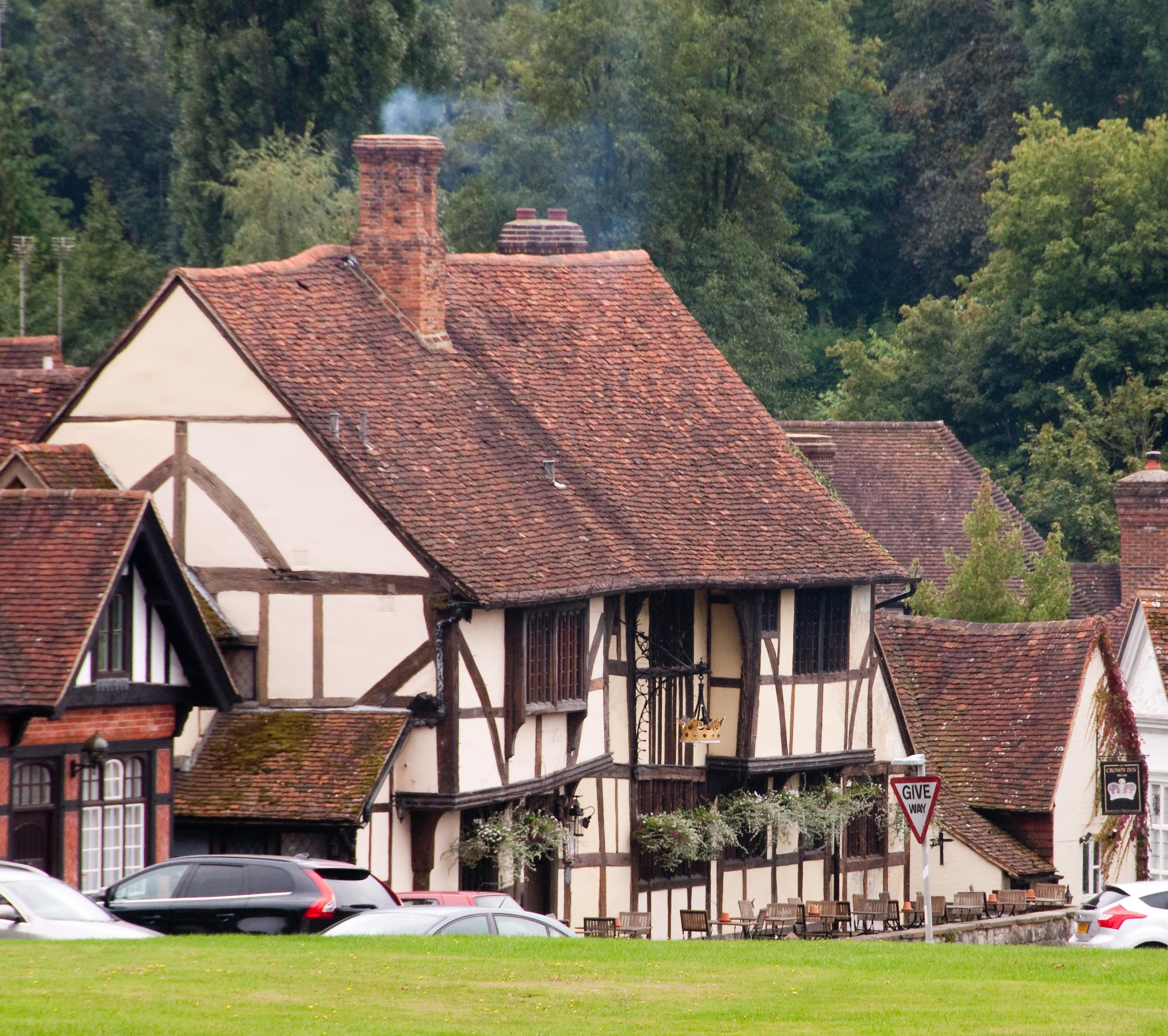
The Crown Inn, Chiddingfold

A "country pub" is simply a rural drinking establishment, though the term has acquired a romantic image typically of thatched roofs and whitewashed stone walls. As with urban pubs, the country pub can function as a social and recreational centre, providing opportunities for people to meet, exchange news, and cooperate on local charitable events. However, that culture of functioning as a social centre for a village and rural community started to diminish in the latter part of the 20th century, as many country pubs either closed down, or were converted to restaurants or gastropubs. Those country pubs located on main routes may once have been coaching inns, providing accommodation or refreshment for travellers before the advent of motorised transport.

=== Roadhouse ===
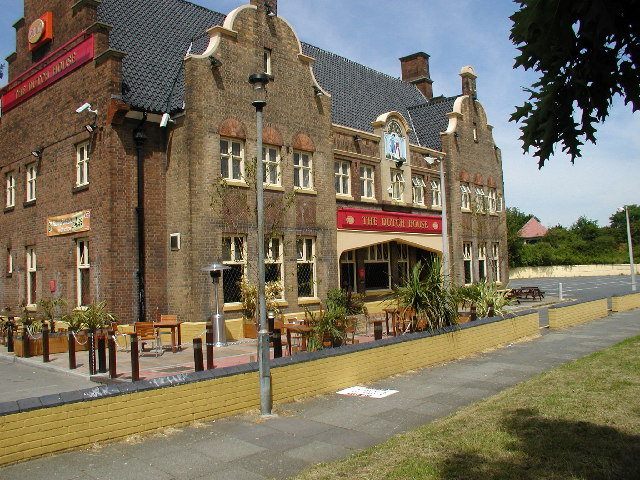
The Dutch House (now closed), a typical 1930s roadhouse on the busy A20 road in Eltham, Greater London.

The term roadhouse was originally applied to a coaching inn, but with the advent of popular travel by motor car in the 1920s and 1930s in the United Kingdom, a new type of roadhouse emerged, often located on the newly constructed arterial roads and bypasses. They were large establishments offering meals and refreshment and accommodation to motorists and parties travelling by charabanc. The largest roadhouses boasted facilities such as tennis courts and swimming pools. Their popularity ended with the outbreak of the Second World War when recreational road travel became impossible, and the advent of post-war drunk driving legislation prevented their full recovery. Many of these establishments are now operated as pub restaurants or fast food outlets.

=== Theme pub ===
A theme pub is a pub that aligns itself to a specific culture, style or activity; often with the intention of attracting a niche clientele. Many are decorated and furnished accordingly, with the theme sometimes dictating the style of food or drink on offer too. Examples of theme pubs include sports bars, rock pubs, biker bars, Goth pubs, strip clubs, karaoke bars and Irish pubs.

=== Micropubs ===
In Britain, a micropub is a very small, modern, one-room pub founded on principles set up by Martyn Hillier, the creator of the first micropub, the Butchers Arms in Herne, Kent, in 2005. Micropubs are "based upon good ale and lively banter", commonly with a strong focus on local cask ale. It became easier to start a small pub after the passing of the 2003 Licensing Act, which became effective in 2005.

=== Desi pubs ===
Desi pubs, pubs managed by a landlord of Indian origin and serving Indian food, originated during the 1960s. They have been cited as examples of cultural integration between Asian and British communities. By 2016, there were at least 50 Desi pubs in the Black Country, England.

=== Other ===
A "nolo" or "no lo" pub serves only non-alcoholic and low-alcoholic beverages. A temperance bar serves no alcohol at all.

== Pub signs ==
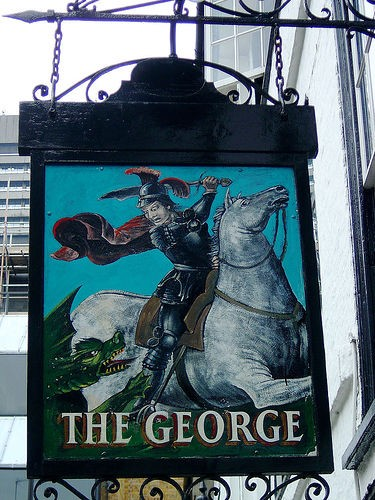
The pub sign of the George, Southwark in south London, depicting St George slaying a dragon

In 1393, King Richard II of England compelled landlords to erect signs outside their premises. The legislation stated "Whosoever shall brew ale in the town with intention of selling it must hang out a sign, otherwise he shall forfeit his ale." This law was to make alehouses easily visible to passing inspectors, borough ale tasters, who would decide the quality of the ale they provided. William Shakespeare's father, John Shakespeare, was one such inspector.

Another important factor was that during the Middle Ages a large proportion of the population were illiterate and so pictures on a sign were more useful than words as a means of identifying a public house. For this reason there was often no reason to write the establishment's name on the sign and inns opened without a formal written name, the name being derived later from the illustration on the pub's sign.

The earliest signs were often not painted but consisted, for example, of paraphernalia connected with the brewing process such as bunches of hops or brewing implements, which were suspended above the door of the pub. In some cases local nicknames, farming terms and puns were used. Local events were often commemorated in pub signs. Simple natural or religious symbols such as suns, stars and crosses were incorporated into pub signs, sometimes adapted to incorporate elements of the heraldry (e.g., the coat of arms) of the local lords who owned the lands upon which the pub stood. Some pubs have Latin inscriptions.

Other subjects that lent themselves to visual depiction included the name of battles (e.g. Trafalgar), explorers, local notables, discoveries, sporting heroes and members of the royal family. Some pub signs are in the form of a pictorial pun or rebus. For example, a pub in Crowborough, East Sussex called The Crow and Gate had for some years an image of a crow with gates as wings. A British Pathé News film of 1956 shows artist Michael Farrar-Bell at work producing inn signs.

Most British pubs still have decorated signs hanging over their doors, and these retain their original function of enabling the identification of the pub. Today's pub signs almost always bear the name of the pub, both in words and in pictorial representation. The more remote country pubs often have stand-alone signs directing potential customers to their door.

== Names ==
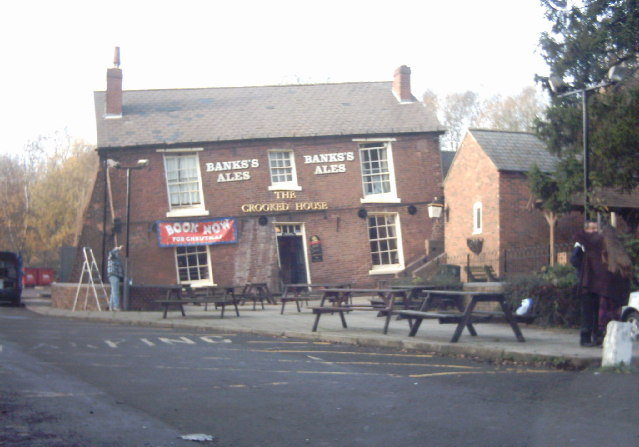
The Crooked House, Himley, was known for the extreme lean of the building, caused by subsidence produced by mining. It burnt down by suspected arson on 5 August 2023, and the owner of the property has been ordered by the local council to reconstruct the pub as was, including the famous tilt.

Pub names are used to identify and differentiate each pub. Modern names are sometimes a marketing ploy or attempt to create "brand awareness", frequently using a comic theme thought to be memorable, Slug and Lettuce for a pub chain being an example. Interesting origins are not confined to old or traditional names, however. Names and their origins can be broken up into a relatively small number of categories.

As many pubs are centuries old, many of their early customers were unable to read, and pictorial signs could be readily recognised when lettering and words could not be read.

Pubs often have traditional names. A common name is the "Marquis of Granby". These pubs were named after John Manners, Marquess of Granby, who was the son of John Manners, 3rd Duke of Rutland and a general in the 18th-century British Army. He showed a great concern for the welfare of his men, and on their retirement, provided funds for many of them to establish taverns, which were subsequently named after him. All pubs granted their licence in 1780 were called the Royal George, after King George III, and the twentieth anniversary of his coronation.

Some names for pubs that seem absurd or whimsical have come from corruptions of old slogans or phrases, such as the Bag o'Nails (Bacchanals), the Goat and Compasses (God Encompasseth Us), the Cat and the Fiddle (Chaton Fidèle: Faithful Kitten) and the Bull and Bush, which purportedly celebrates the victory of Henry VIII at "Boulogne Bouche" or Boulogne-sur-Mer Harbour.

== Entertainment ==
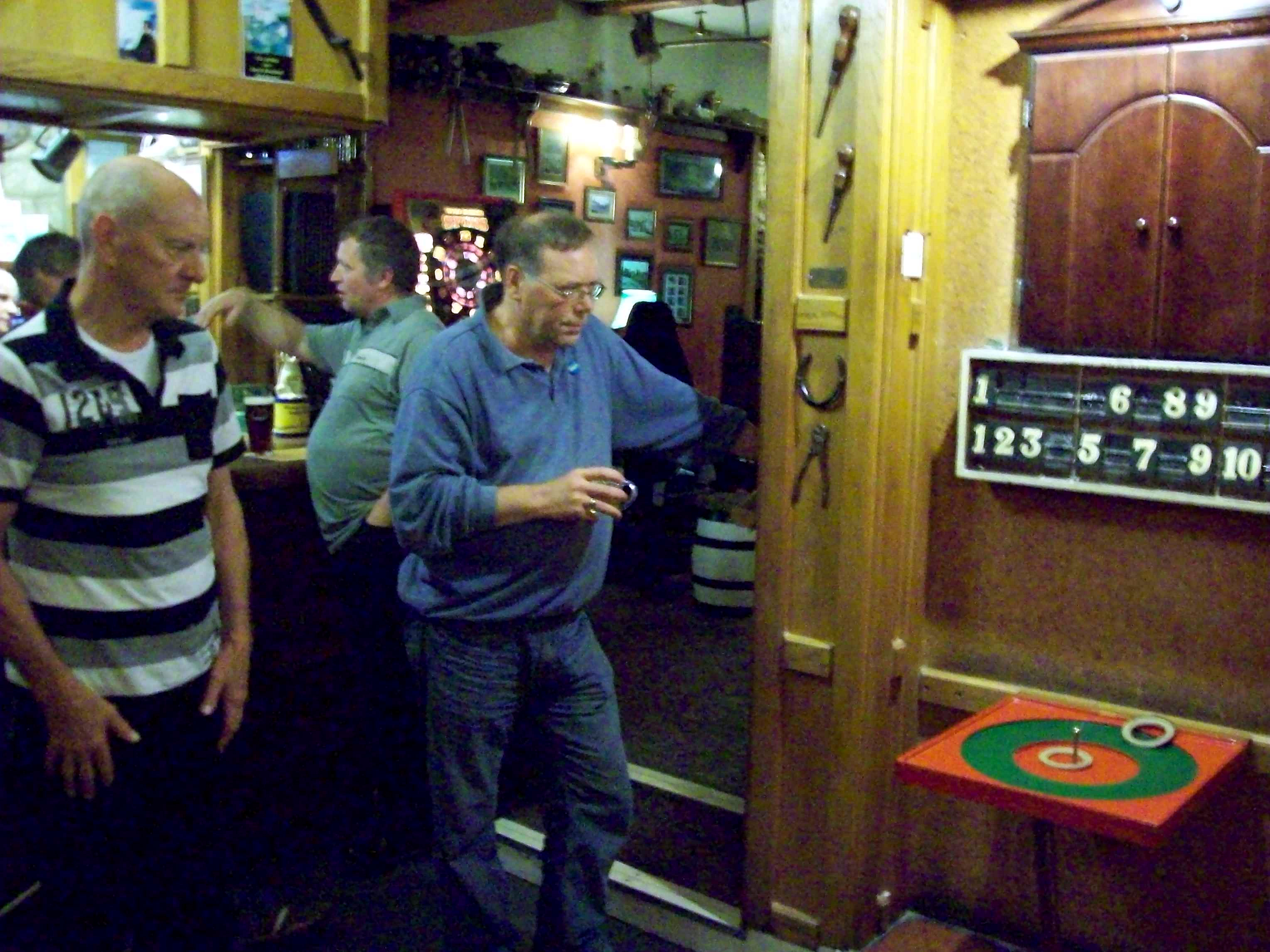
Quoits being played at a pub in Parkend, Gloucestershire.

Traditional games are played in pubs, ranging from the well-known darts, skittles, dominoes, cards and bar billiards, to the more obscure Aunt Sally, nine men's morris, quoits, and ringing the bull. In the UK betting is legally limited to certain games such as cribbage or dominoes, played for small stakes. In recent decades the game of pool (both the British and American versions) has increased in popularity as well as other table based games such as snooker (rarely) or table football.

Increasingly, more modern games such as video games and slot machines are provided. Pubs hold special events, from tournaments of the aforementioned games to karaoke nights to pub quizzes. Some play pop music and hip-hop (dance bar), or show football and rugby union on big screen televisions (sports bar). Shove ha'penny and Bat and trap were also popular in pubs south of London.

Some pubs in the UK also have football teams composed of regular customers. Many of these teams are in leagues that play matches on Sundays, hence the term "Sunday League Football". Bowling is found in association with pubs in some parts of the country and the local team plays matches against teams invited from elsewhere on the pub's bowling green.

Pubs may be venues for pub songs and live music. During the 1970s pubs provided an outlet for a number of bands, such as Kilburn and the High Roads, Dr. Feelgood and the Kursaal Flyers, who formed a musical genre called pub rock that was a precursor to punk music.

== Food ==
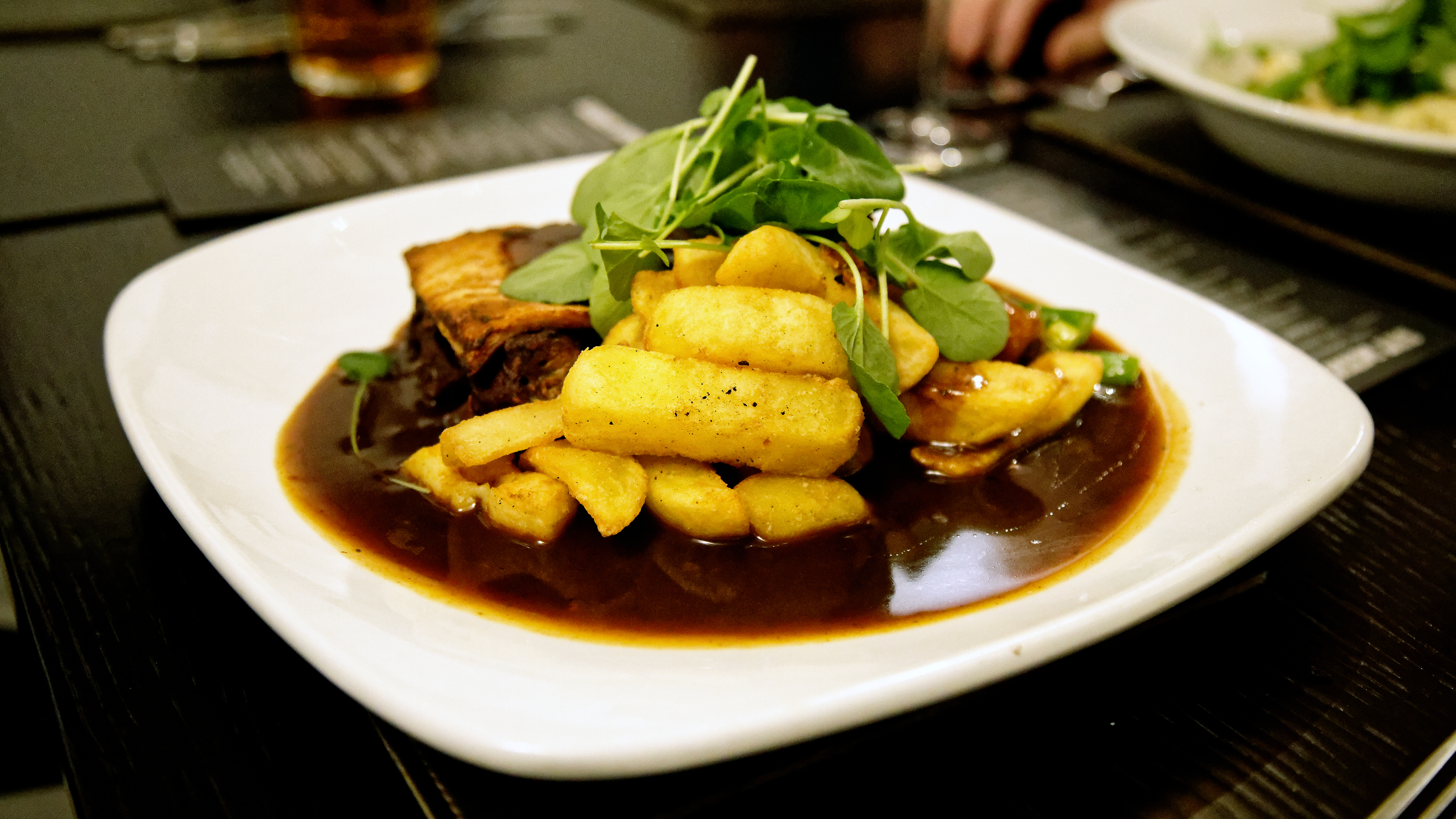
A pub meal consisting of steak and kidney pie and chips topped with watercress and served on a bed of gravy

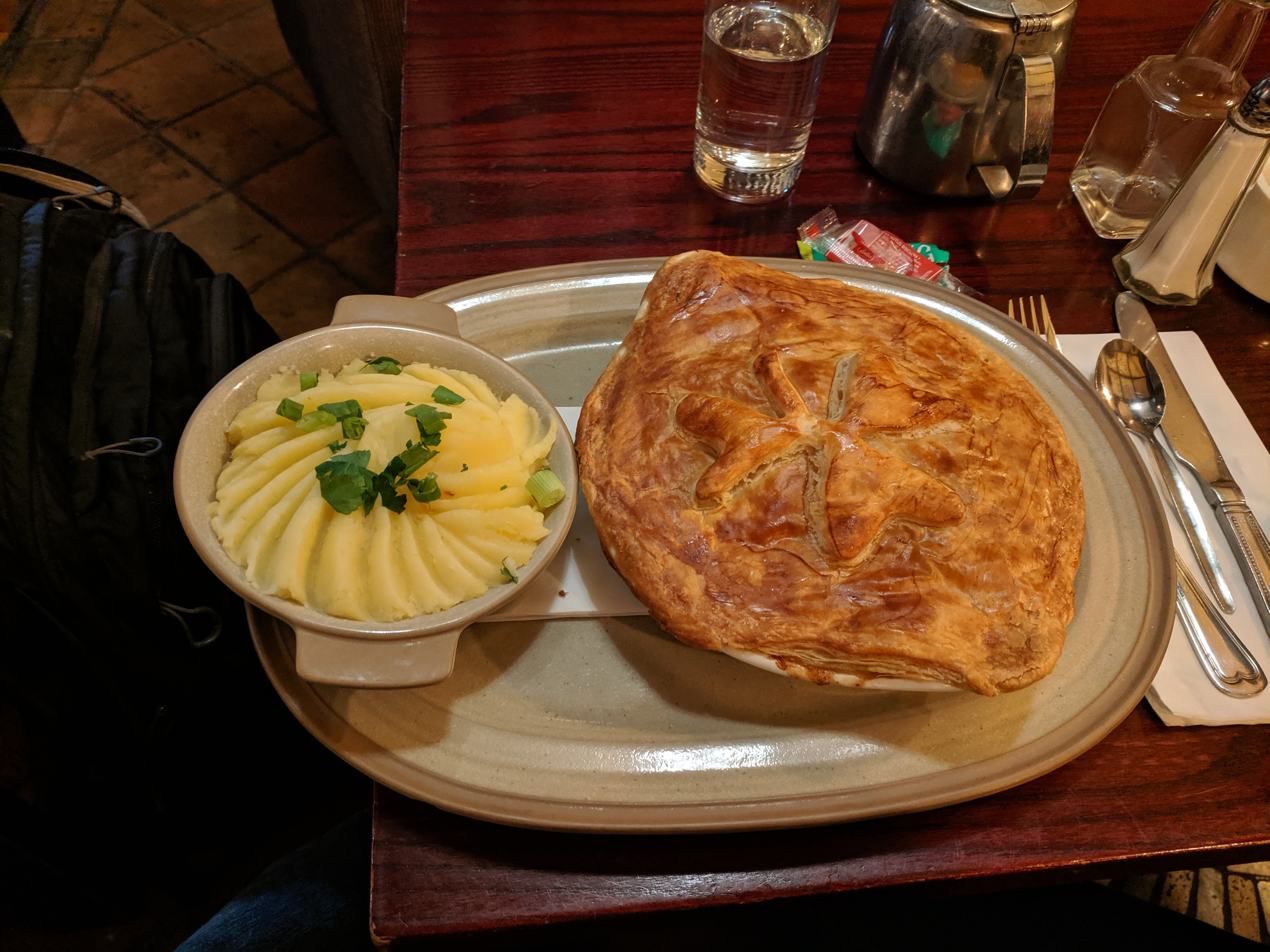
A meal of meat pie and mashed potatoes served at a Dublin pub

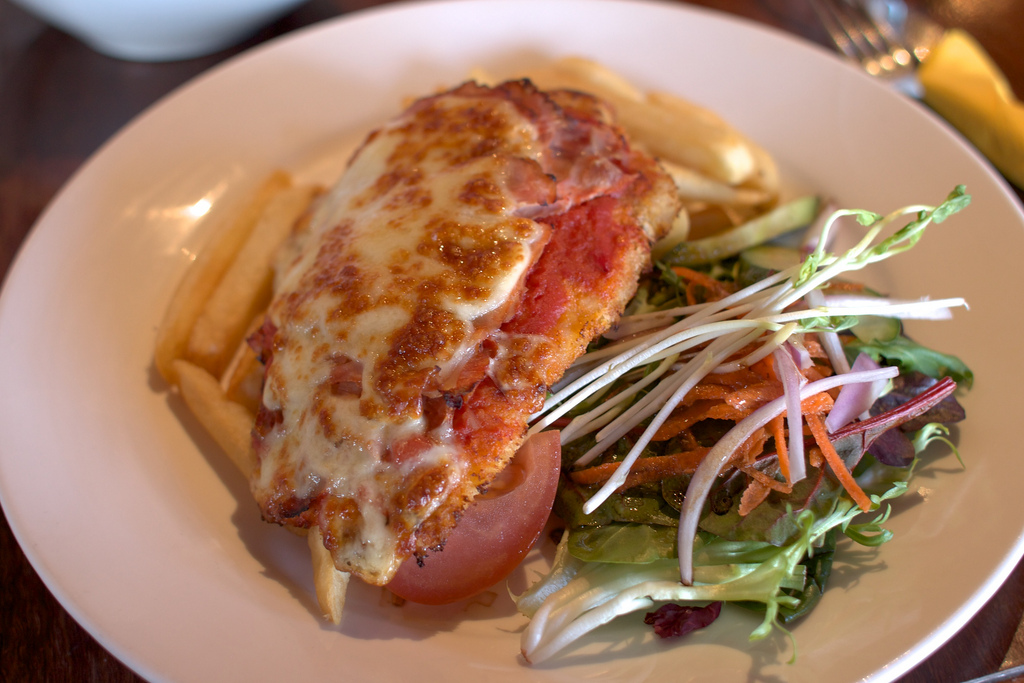
Chicken parmigiana, colloquially known as a chicken "parmi" or "parma", is a popular pub food in Australia

Some pubs have a long tradition of serving food, dating back to their historic usage as inns and hotels where travellers would stay. Many pubs were drinking establishments, and little emphasis was placed on the serving of food, other than sandwiches and "bar snacks", such as pork scratchings, pickled eggs, salted crisps and peanuts. These all helped to increase beer sales. In South East England (especially London) it was common until recent times for vendors of cockles, whelks, mussels, and other shellfish to sell them during the evening and at closing time. Many mobile shellfish stalls would set up near pubs, a practice that continues in London's East End. Otherwise, pickled cockles and mussels may be offered by the pub in jars or packets.

Starting in the 1950s, some British pubs would offer "a pie and a pint", with hot individual steak and ale pies made easily on the premises by the proprietor's wife during the lunchtime opening hours. The ploughman's lunch became popular in the late 1960s, as did the convenient "chicken in a basket", a portion of roast chicken with chips, served on a napkin in a wicker basket.

Lunch at an Australian pub is called a counter lunch, while the term counter meal is used for either lunch or dinner. Common dishes served at counter lunches and counter meals are steak and chips, chicken parmigiana and chips, a mixed grill (an assortment of grilled meats), and roast lamb or beef with roast vegetables.

Family chain pubs that serve food in the evening gained popularity in the 1970s, and included Berni Inn and Beefeater.

Quality dropped but variety increased with the introduction of microwave ovens and frozen food. "Pub grub" expanded to include British food items such as steak and ale pie, shepherd's pie, fish and chips, bangers and mash, Sunday roast, ploughman's lunch, chicken tikka masala, and pasties. In addition, dishes such as burgers, chicken wings, lasagne and chilli con carne are often served. Some pubs offer elaborate hot and cold snacks free to customers at Sunday lunchtimes, to prevent them getting hungry and leaving for their lunch at home.

Since the 1990s, food has become a more important part of a pub's trade, and today most pubs serve lunches and dinners at the table in addition to (or instead of) snacks consumed at the bar. They may have a separate dining room. Some pubs serve meals to a higher standard, to match good restaurant standards; these are sometimes termed gastropubs.

== Listed ==
CAMRA maintains a "National Inventory" of historical notability and of architecturally and decoratively notable pubs. The National Trust owns thirty-six public houses of historic interest including the George Inn, Southwark, London and the Crown Liquor Saloon, Belfast, Northern Ireland.

== Records ==
=== Highest and remotest ===
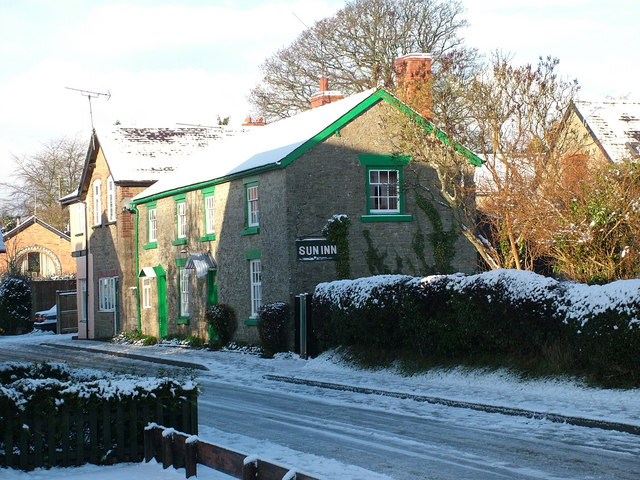
The Sun Inn, Herefordshire. One of the few remaining parlour pubs

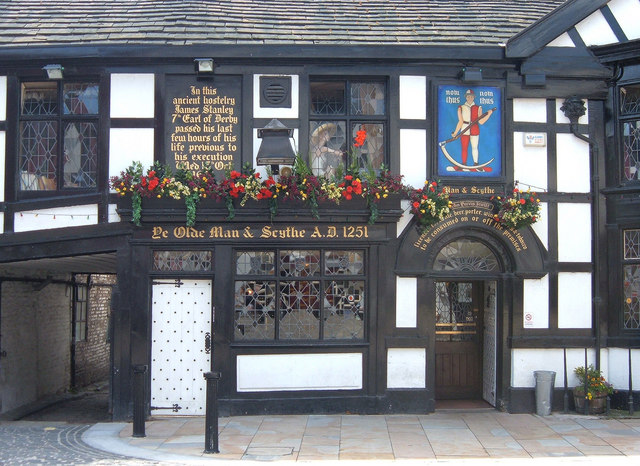
Ye Olde Man & Scythe, Bolton

The highest pub in the United Kingdom is the Tan Hill Inn, North Yorkshire, at 1,732 feet (528 m) above sea level. The remotest pub on the British mainland is the Old Forge in the village of Inverie, Lochaber, Scotland. There is no road access and it may only be reached by an 18-mile (29 km) walk over mountains, or a 7-mile (11 km) sea crossing.

=== Smallest ===
Contenders for the smallest public house in the UK include:

- The Nutshell – Bury St Edmunds, Suffolk
- The Lakeside Inn – Southport, Merseyside
- The Little Gem – Aylesford, Kent
- The Smiths Arms – Godmanstone, Dorset
- The Signal Box Inn – Cleethorpes, Lincolnshire

The list includes a small number of parlour pubs, one of which is the Sun Inn in Leintwardine, Herefordshire.

The smallest public house in Wales is claimed by Y Goron Fach (the Little Crown) in Denbigh, with a single bar of 15 square metres (160 sq ft).

=== Largest ===
The largest pub in the UK is the Royal Victoria Pavilion, in Ramsgate, Kent. The venue was previously a casino and before that a theatre.

=== Oldest ===
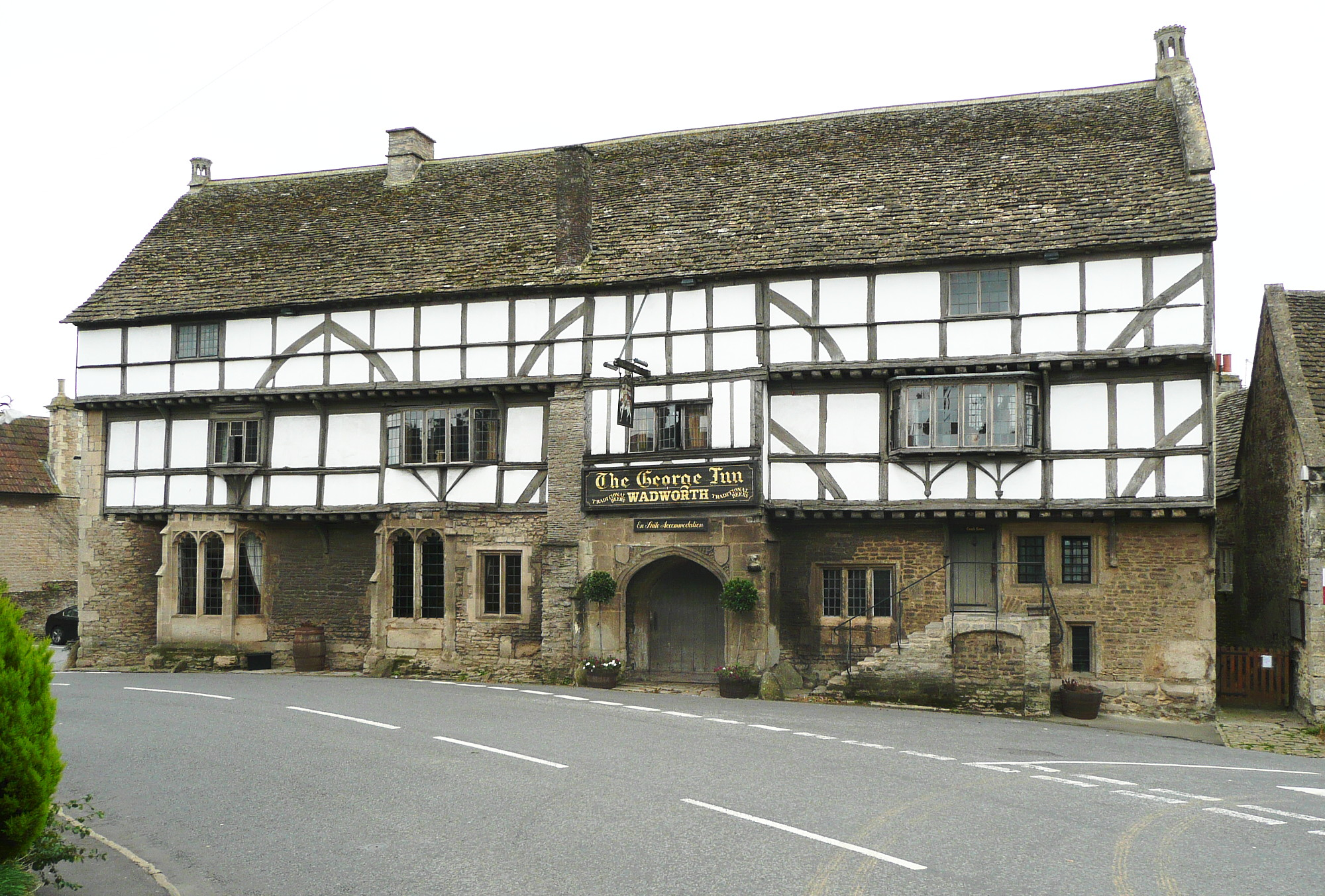
The George Inn in Norton St Philip, Somerset, partly dated to the late 14th century

A number of pubs claim to be the oldest surviving establishment in the United Kingdom, although in several cases original buildings have been demolished and replaced on the same site. Others are ancient buildings that were used for purposes other than as a pub previously in their history. Some notable claims include:

- Ye Olde Fighting Cocks in St Albans, Hertfordshire, held the Guinness World Record for the oldest pub in England for many years, as it is an 11th-century structure on an eighth-century site; however, the record was withdrawn in 2000 after review, and the category was deemed impossible to verify.
- Ye Olde Trip to Jerusalem in Nottingham has been claimed to be the "oldest inn in England" with a founding date of 1189, but this relies on the fact it is constructed on the site of Nottingham Castle's former brewhouse; the present building actually dates from around 1650.
- The George Inn in Norton St Philip, Somerset, has part of its frontage dated to the late 14th century, with timber-framed upper floors added in the 15th century. It was a stop with stabling on a stage coach route between London and South West England.
- The Nags Head in Burntwood, Staffordshire, only dates back to the 16th century, but an (inaccurate) claim is still frequently made that a pub on the site was mentioned in the Domesday Book.
- There is archaeological evidence that parts of the foundations of the Old Ferry Boat Inn in Holywell may date to AD 460, and there is evidence of ale being served as early as AD 560, but definitive dating evidence of the main building has yet to be established.
- The Bingley Arms in Bardsey, West Yorkshire, is claimed to date to 905 AD, but the current building only dates from the 18th century.
- Ye Olde Salutation Inn in Nottingham dates from 1240, although the building served as a tannery and a private residence before becoming an inn sometime before the English Civil War.
- The Adam and Eve in Norwich was first recorded in 1249, when it was an alehouse for the workers constructing nearby Norwich Cathedral.
- Ye Olde Man & Scythe in Bolton, Greater Manchester, is mentioned by name in a charter of 1251, but the current building is dated 1631. Its cellars are the only surviving part of the older structure.

=== Longest and shortest name ===
The town of Stalybridge in Greater Manchester is thought to have the pubs with both the longest and shortest names in the United Kingdom – The Old Thirteenth Cheshire Astley Volunteer Rifleman Corps Inn and the Q Inn, both operating as of 2019 (the Rifleman reopening in new premises, moving from Astley Street to premises two doors away from the Q Inn in Market Street in 2019, after being closed for three years). The original Rifleman building retains a pub sign, and a blue plaque from 1995 recording the recognition of the name in the Guinness Book of Records.

== Statistics ==
- The most expensive place to get a pint of beer is in Dubai, UAE, where prices average £10.04 (2026).
- The average retail price of a pint of beer in the UK is £5.50 (2026).
- The cheapest place to get a beer in the UK is Doncaster, where a pint costs on average £3.25 (2026).
- In 2018, British people drank 7.75 billion pints of beer: 21.2 million pints a day.
- As of 2019, there were 40,683 pubs in England, 2,901 in Wales and 3,612 in Scotland. Of these, according to the British Beer and Pub Association, 23,400 operated independently, 13,900 were owned by pub companies, and 9,900 belonged to breweries.
- As of 2020, there were 58 pubs on average per 100,000 people across the UK.
- Pubs are closing at an approximate rate of two a day (as of May 2026).

== Cultural associations ==
Inns and taverns feature throughout English literature and poetry, from the Tabard Inn in Chaucer's Canterbury Tales onwards.

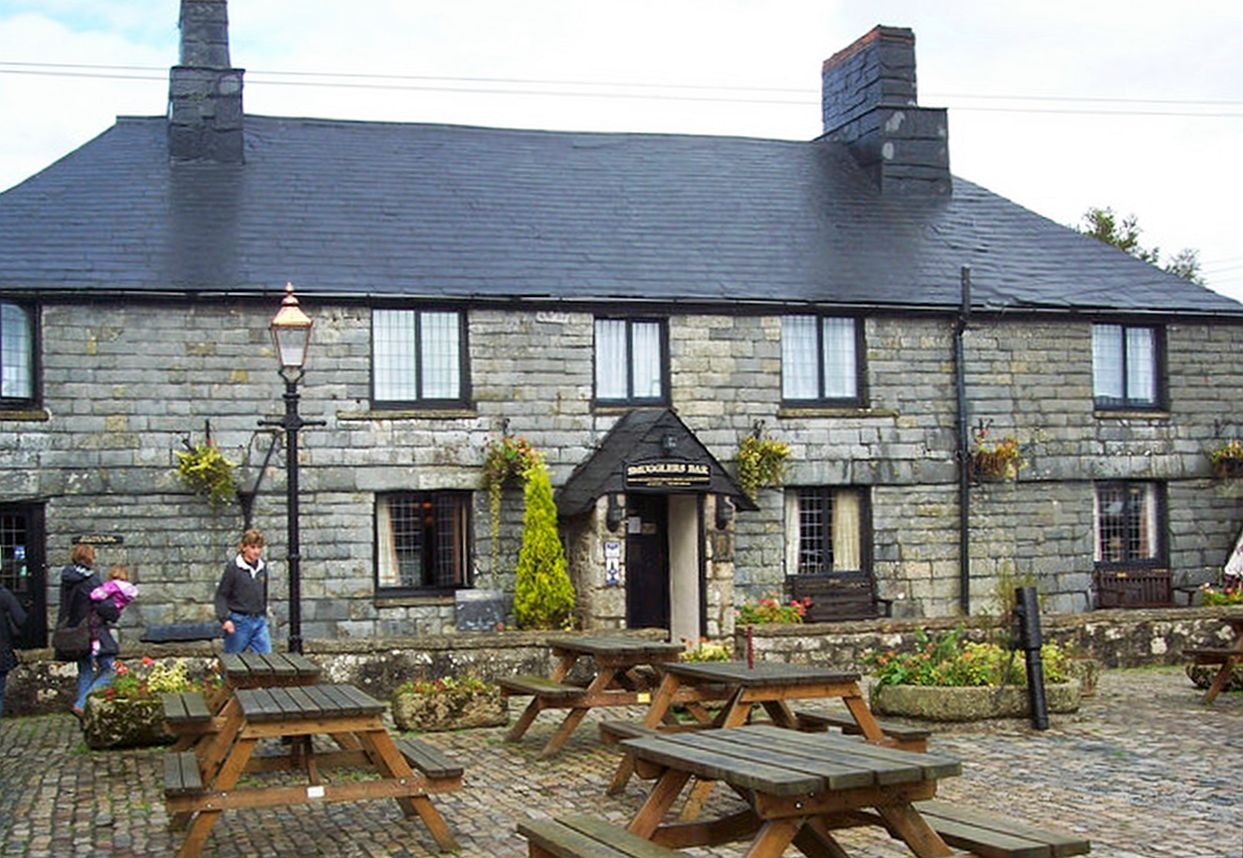
Jamaica Inn in Cornwall inspired a novel and a film.

The highwayman Dick Turpin used the Swan Inn at Woughton-on-the-Green in Buckinghamshire as his base. Jamaica Inn near Bolventor in Cornwall gave its name to a 1936 novel by Daphne du Maurier and a 1939 film directed by Alfred Hitchcock. In the 1920s John Fothergill (1876–1957) was the innkeeper of the Spread Eagle in Thame, Berkshire, and published his autobiography: An Innkeeper's Diary (London: Chatto & Windus, 1931). During his idiosyncratic occupancy many famous people came to stay, such as H. G. Wells. United States president George W. Bush fulfilled his lifetime ambition of visiting a 'genuine British pub' during his November 2003 state visit to the UK when he had lunch and a pint of non-alcoholic lager (Bush being a teetotaler) with British Prime Minister Tony Blair at the Dun Cow pub in Sedgefield, County Durham, in Blair's home constituency. There were approximately 53,500 public houses in 2009 in the United Kingdom. This number has been declining every year, so that nearly half of the smaller villages no longer have a local pub.

=== London ===
Many of London's pubs are known to have been used by famous people, but in some cases, such as the association between Samuel Johnson and Ye Olde Cheshire Cheese, this is speculative, based on little more than the fact that the person is known to have lived nearby. However, Charles Dickens is known to have visited the Cheshire Cheese, the Prospect of Whitby, Ye Olde Cock Tavern and many others. Samuel Pepys is also associated with the Prospect of Whitby and the Cock Tavern.

The Fitzroy Tavern is a pub situated at 16 Charlotte Street in the Fitzrovia district, to which it gives its name. It became famous (or according to others, infamous) during a period spanning the 1920s to the mid-1950s as a meeting place for many of London's artists, intellectuals and bohemians such as Dylan Thomas, Augustus John, and George Orwell. Several establishments in Soho, London, have associations with well-known, post-war literary and artistic figures, including the Pillars of Hercules, the Colony Room and the Coach and Horses. The Canonbury Tavern, Canonbury, was the prototype for Orwell's ideal English pub, The Moon Under Water.

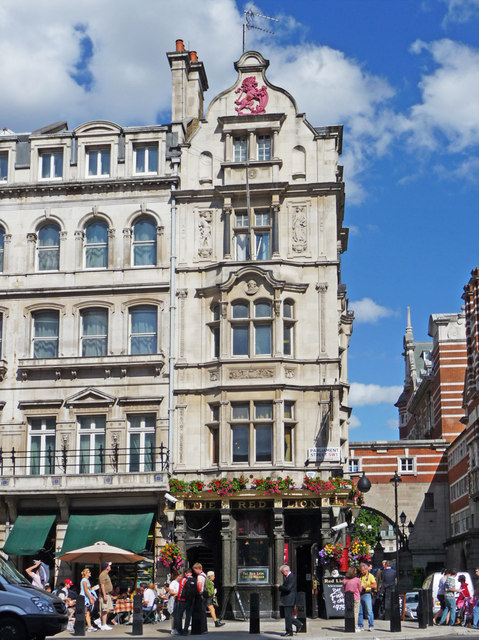
The Red Lion in Whitehall is close to the Houses of Parliament and is frequented by Members of Parliament (MPs) and political journalists.

The Red Lion in Whitehall is close to the Palace of Westminster and is consequently used by political journalists and Members of Parliament (MPs). The pub is equipped with a Division bell that summons MPs back to the chamber when they are required to take part in a vote. The Punch Bowl, Mayfair was at one time jointly owned by Madonna and Guy Ritchie. The Coleherne public house in Earls Court was a well-known gay pub from the 1950s. It attracted many well-known patrons, such as Freddie Mercury, Kenny Everett and Rudolph Nureyev. It was used by the serial-killer Colin Ireland to pick up victims.

Jack Straw's Castle was a pub named after Jack Straw, one of the three leaders of Peasants' Revolt, the pub was active since the 14th century until its destruction by the Blitz during the Second World War.

In 1966 the Blind Beggar in Whitechapel became infamous as the scene of a murder committed by gangster Ronnie Kray. The Ten Bells is associated with several of the victims of Jack the Ripper. In 1955, Ruth Ellis, the last woman executed in the United Kingdom, shot David Blakely as he emerged from the Magdala in South Hill Park, Hampstead, It is said that Vladimir Lenin and a young Joseph Stalin met in the Crown and Anchor pub (now known as the Crown Tavern) on Clerkenwell Green when the latter was visiting London in 1903.

The Angel, Islington was formerly a coaching inn, the first on the Great North Road, the main route northwards out of London, where Thomas Paine is believed to have written much of Rights of Man (1791). It was mentioned by Charles Dickens, became a Lyons Corner House, and is now a Co-operative Bank.

=== Oxford and Cambridge ===
The Eagle and Child and the Lamb and Flag, Oxford, were regular meeting places of the Inklings, a writers' group that included J. R. R. Tolkien and C. S. Lewis. The Eagle in Cambridge is where Francis Crick interrupted patrons' lunchtime on 28 February 1953 to announce that he and James Watson had "discovered the secret of life" after they had come up with their proposal for the structure of DNA. The anecdote is related in Watson's book The Double Helix. and commemorated with a blue plaque on the outside wall.

== Outside Great Britain ==
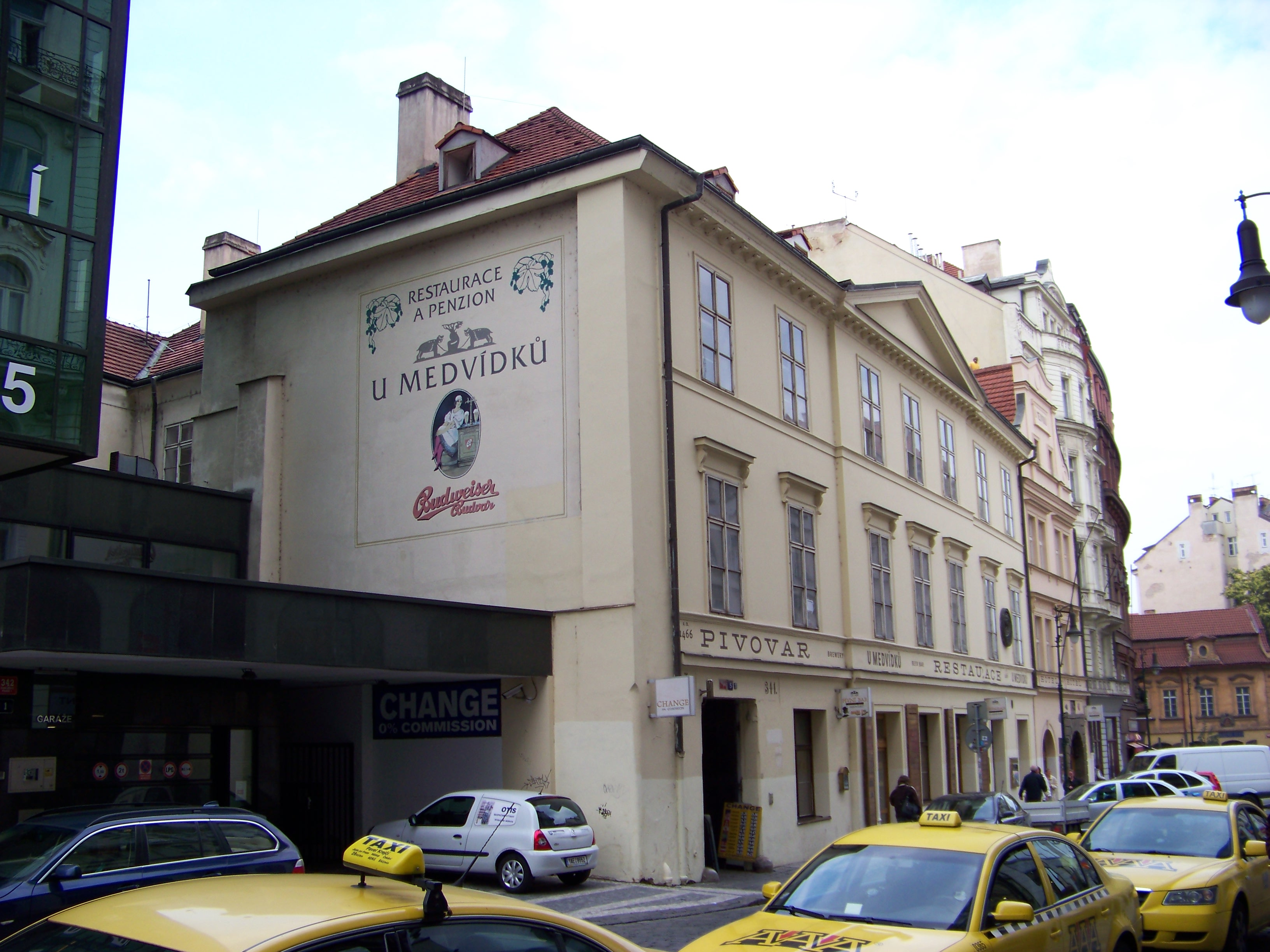
U Medvídků, one of the oldest pubs in Europe

Although "British" pubs found outside of Britain and its former colonies are often themed bars owing little to the original British pub, a number of "true" pubs may be found around the world.

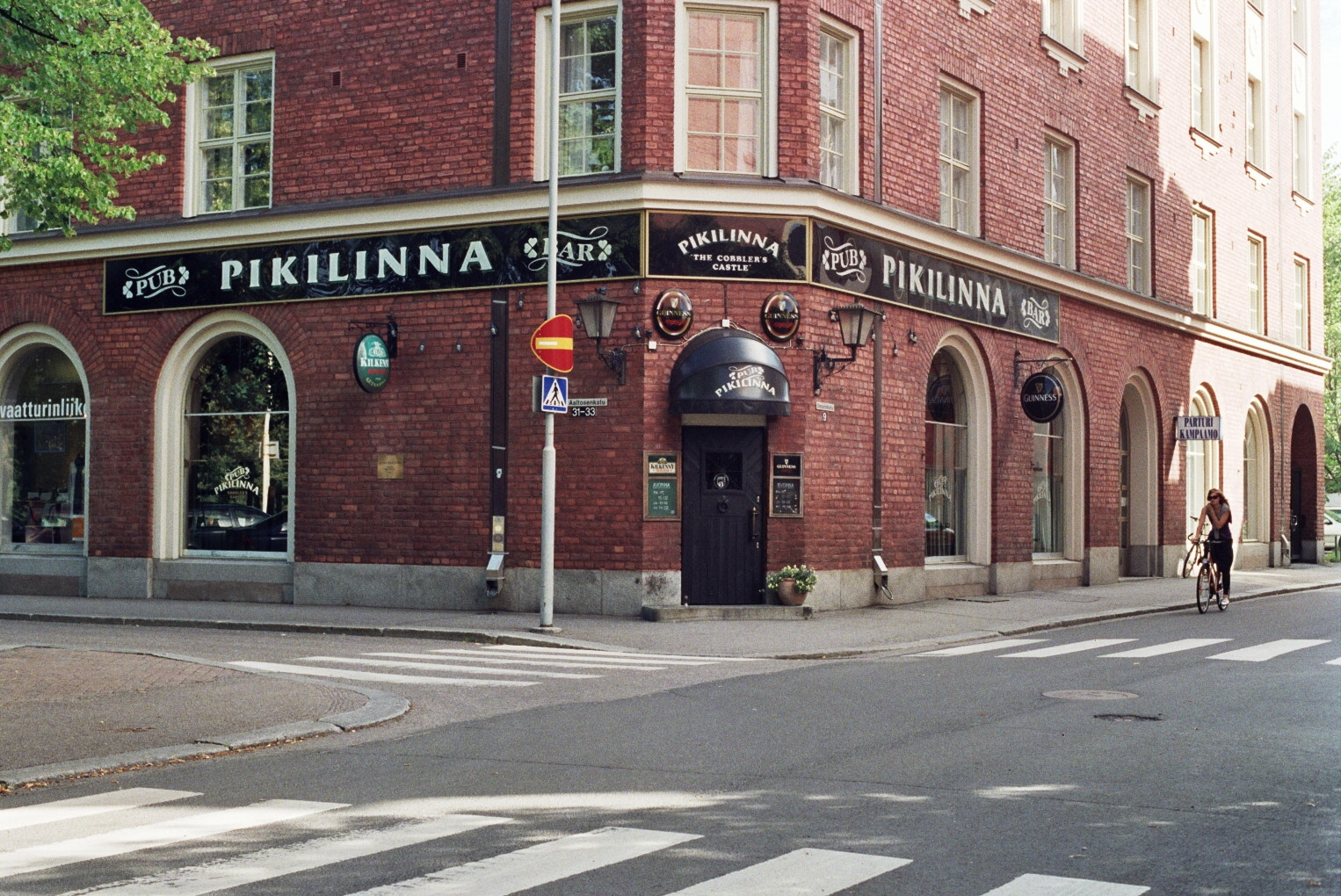
Pub Pikilinna, an Irish-style public house in the Tammela district of the city of Tampere, Finland.

In Scandinavia, especially Denmark, a number of pubs that eschew "theming" have opened. They instead focus on providing carefully conditioned beer, often independent of any particular brewery or chain, in an environment not unfamiliar to a British pub-goer. Some import British cask ale, rather than beer in kegs, to provide the full British real ale experience to their customers. This newly established Danish interest in British cask beer and the British pub tradition is reflected by the fact that some 56 British cask beers were available at the 2008 European Beer Festival in Copenhagen, which was attended by more than 20,000 people.

In Ireland, pubs are known for their atmosphere or "craic". In Irish, a pub is referred to as teach tábhairne ("tavernhouse") or teach óil ("drinkinghouse"). Live music, either sessions of traditional Irish music or varieties of modern popular music, is frequently featured in the pubs of Ireland. Pubs in Northern Ireland are largely identical to their counterparts in the Republic of Ireland except for the lack of spirit grocers. A side effect of the Troubles was that the lack of a tourist industry meant that a higher proportion of traditional bars have survived the wholesale refitting of Irish pub interiors in the "English style" in the 1950s and 1960s. New Zealand sports a number of Irish pubs.

Pubs have a long history in Canada, with some still operating after 200 years, like the Olde Angel Inn in Niagara-on-the-Lake. An "English-looking" pub trend started in the 1990s, built into existing storefronts, often run by corporate pub firms. Most universities in Canada have campus pubs that are central to student life—serving food and drink as well as hosting social events. Often these pubs are run by the student's union and at some universities, a budget is reserved for course pub nights. The gastropub concept has caught on, as traditional British influences are to be found in many Canadian dishes. Aside from pubs, the term "bar" can refer to themed drinking establishments, sports bars, or cocktail bars, or to the physical counter in a pub. Tavern was previously a popular term, though it has become somewhat antiquated.

In South Africa pubs and taverns have had a particularly long and notable presence in the city of Cape Town. Prior to the opening of the Suez Canal in 1869, Cape Town was a major trading port between Europe and Asia and hosted a very large number of drinking establishments earning the city the moniker Tavern of the Seas. The oldest currently operating pub in South Africa, and one of the last drinking establishments left from the Tavern of the Seas era, is the Perseverance Tavern opened in 1808.

== In fiction ==
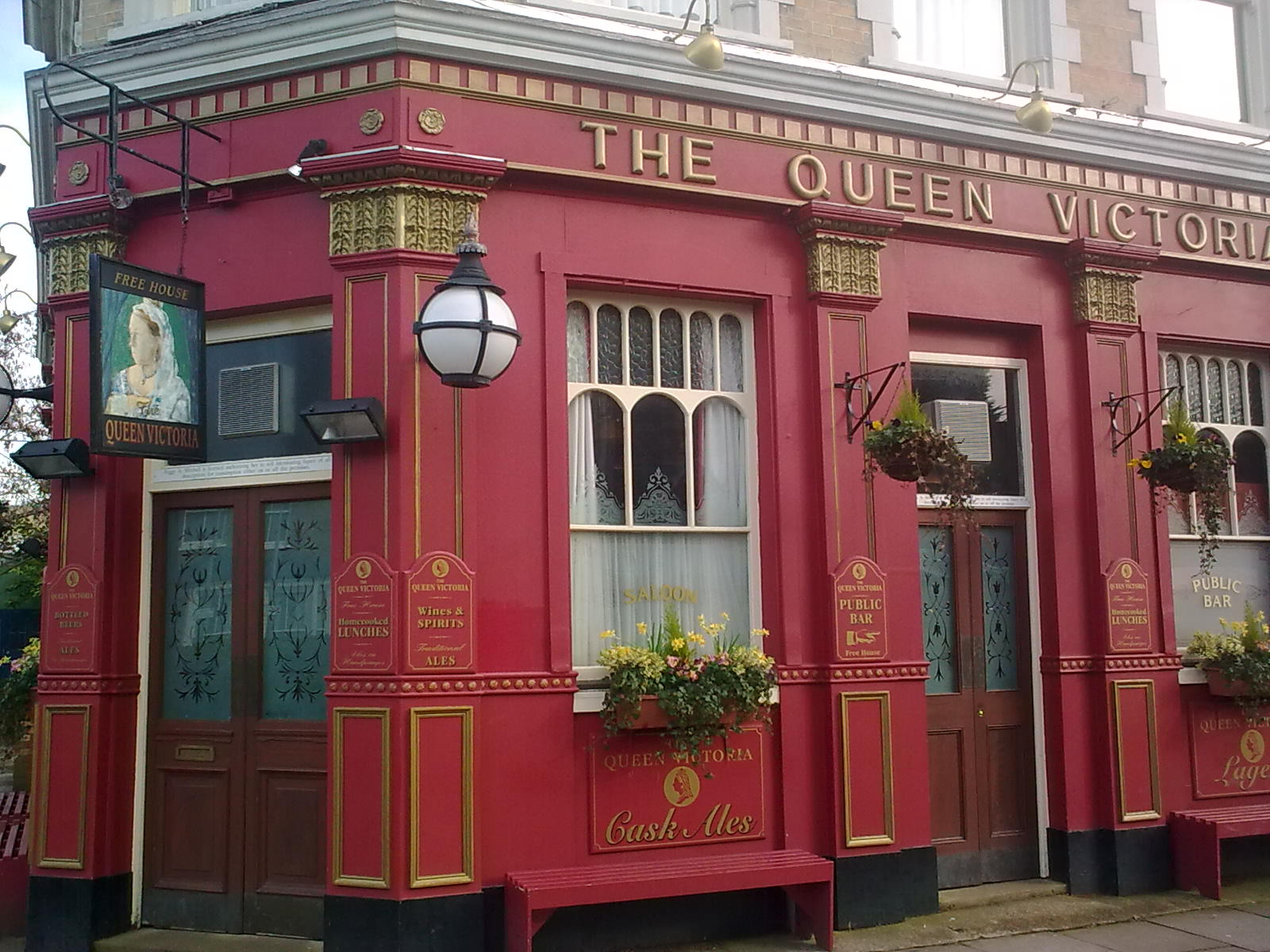
The fictitious Queen Victoria pub, EastEnders, London

Pubs are a common setting for fictional works, including novels, stories, films, video games, and other works. In many cases, authors and other creators develop imaginary pubs for their works, some of which have become notable fictional places. Notable fictional pubs include The Admiral Benbow Inn in the Treasure Island pirate story, the Garrison in the 1920s crime TV drama Peaky Blinders, the Golden Perch, the Prancing Pony, and the Green Dragon in the high fantasy novel The Lord of the Rings, the Leaky Cauldron and the Hog's Head in the Harry Potter fantasy series, Moe's Tavern, a working-class venue in The Simpsons, the Nag's Head in Only Fools and Horses, and the Oak and Crosier in the video game The Elder Scrolls IV: Oblivion.

The major soap operas on British television each feature a fictional pub, and these pubs have become household names in Britain. The Rovers Return is the pub in Coronation Street, the British soap broadcast on ITV. The Queen Vic (short for the Queen Victoria) is the pub in EastEnders, the major soap on BBC One and the Woolpack in ITV's Emmerdale. The sets of each of the three major television soap operas have been visited by some of the members of the royal family, including Queen Elizabeth II. The centrepiece of each visit was a trip into the Rovers, the Queen Vic, or the Woolpack to be offered a drink. The Bull in the BBC Radio 4 soap opera The Archers is an important meeting point.

== See also ==
- Alcohol licensing laws of Ireland
- Alcohol licensing laws of the United Kingdom
  - Licensing Act 1904 – Act of the Parliament of the United Kingdom
- Campaign for Real Ale – British consumer organization
- Flat-roofed pub – Type of pub
- List of award-winning pubs in London – English pubs
- List of microbreweries
- List of public house topics
- List of public houses in Australia
- Pub crawl – Visiting multiple pubs or bars in a series
- Public houses in Australia
- Public houses in Ireland – Licensed establishment that serves alcoholic drinks
- SpåraKoff

== Bibliography ==
- Christy, Miller (1887). "Trade Signs of Essex: a popular account of the origin and meanings of the public house and other signs now or formerly found in the county of Essex". Chelmsford: Edmund Durrant & Co. Archived from the original on 20 February 2012.
- Cornell, Martyn (2003). Beer: the story of the pint. London: Headline. ISBN 978-0-7553-1165-1.
- Haydon, Peter (2001). Beer and Britannia: an inebriated history of Britain. Stroud: Sutton. ISBN 978-0-7509-2748-2.
- Jackson, Michael & Smyth, Frank (1976). The English Pub. London: Collins. ISBN 0-00-216210-5.
- www.breweryartists.co.uk A history of the Brewery Artists Inn Sign studio
