= Flat-roofed pub =

Type of pub

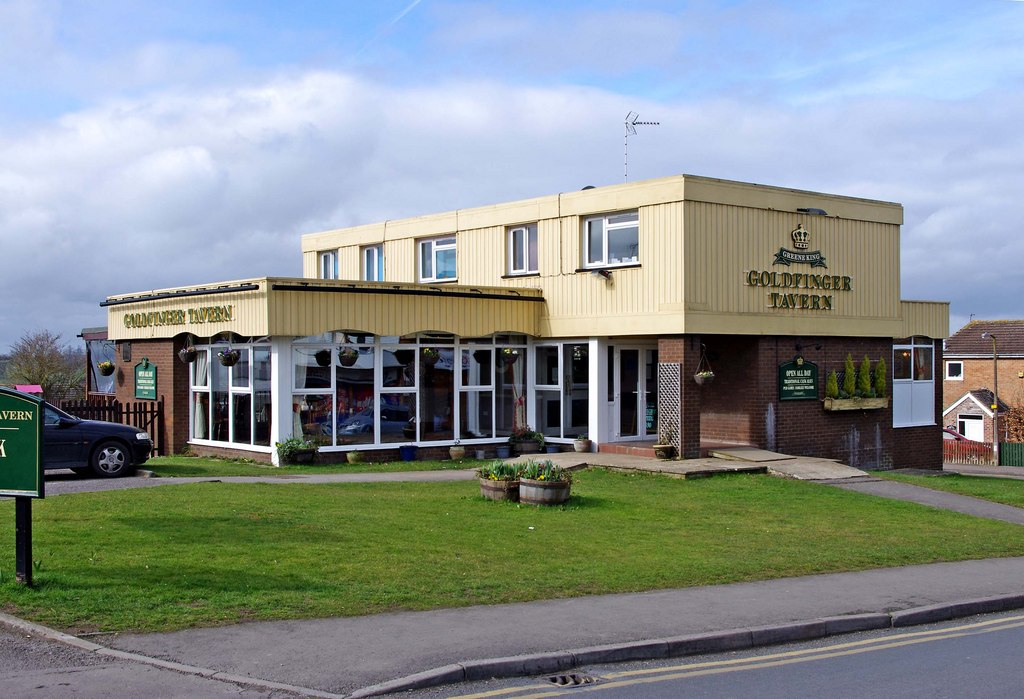
The Goldfinger Tavern in Highworth, Wiltshire, a 1960s estate pub in 2011

In the United Kingdom and Ireland, a flat-roofed pub is a public house with a flat roof, often located on housing estates. They are frequently of concrete construction, with flat roofs rather than more conventional pitched roofs.

Flat-roofed pubs have been the subject of derision in media and popular culture, often being presented as "rough", in a manifestation of British cultural class-based stereotyping of those in lower-income groups. Their architecture has also tended to be viewed unfavourably, and they are more vulnerable to demolition than traditional structures. The conservation body Historic England has a project to record the public's interaction with post-war pubs, which includes many flat-roofed establishments.

== History ==
Many flat-roofed pubs were built in the 20th century as part of local planned communities, such as tower blocks and council housing estates. Town planners allocated planning permission for a certain number of pubs to each estate, depending on their population and perceived need. Sites were allocated to different breweries as tied houses. The breweries' in-house architects often designed the new structures, which were usually in keeping with the surrounding estate. These could range from traditional brick-built structures to concrete brutalist flat-roofed buildings. As a result of rapid post-war residential construction more pubs were built between 1945 and 1985 than in any similar period of time in British history. Many of the new pubs departed from the traditional Victorian English pub with its dark wood and brass features and instead embraced modern functionality.

== Decline and preservation ==
Flat-roofed pubs and estate pubs in general have suffered a decline in recent years. Changes in work patterns and leisure activities, gentrification, and the effects of an overall decline in pub use have led to a loss of trade and profitability. Because of their real estate value some flat-roofed pubs have been converted into housing, shops, restaurants, nurseries and places of worship. Others have been demolished to make way for new development. Flat-roofed pubs constructed in the 1950s, 60s and 70s are particularly vulnerable to demolition as their architecture is not generally appreciated.

Historic England has expressed concern over the potential loss of an architectural and culturally distinct class of structure and has launched a project to gather anecdotes and photographs from the public relating to post-war pubs. A spokesperson for Historic England said, "[Flat-roofed pubs] have come to be seen as characterless buildings, particularly in terms of their interiors. But actually what we’ve been finding is that when they were built and opened they were actually far from characterless. They were very exciting in many cases".

The Laurieston Bar in Glasgow, a single-storey flat-roofed pub, received category C listed status from Historic Environment Scotland on 29 April 2010 as "an excellent example of 1960s public house design of which very few examples are thought to remain today".

== Perception in popular culture ==
Flat-roofed pubs are often disparaged for their perceived lack of character and history, but also for supposed links to violence. A saying, "Never drink in a flat-roofed pub", has been cited in Britain and has been attributed to comedian Sean Lock and popularised by Viz magazine. In his autobiography Back Story: A Memoir, comedian David Mitchell stated, "pubs with flat roofs are almost always terrible – scruffy, rough estate pubs covered in tatty England flag bunting". Mitchell claimed that they had no other purpose than to supply alcohol to residents and that few provide good quality food or real ales.
