= U Medvídků =

Coordinates: 50°04′58″N 14°25′06″E

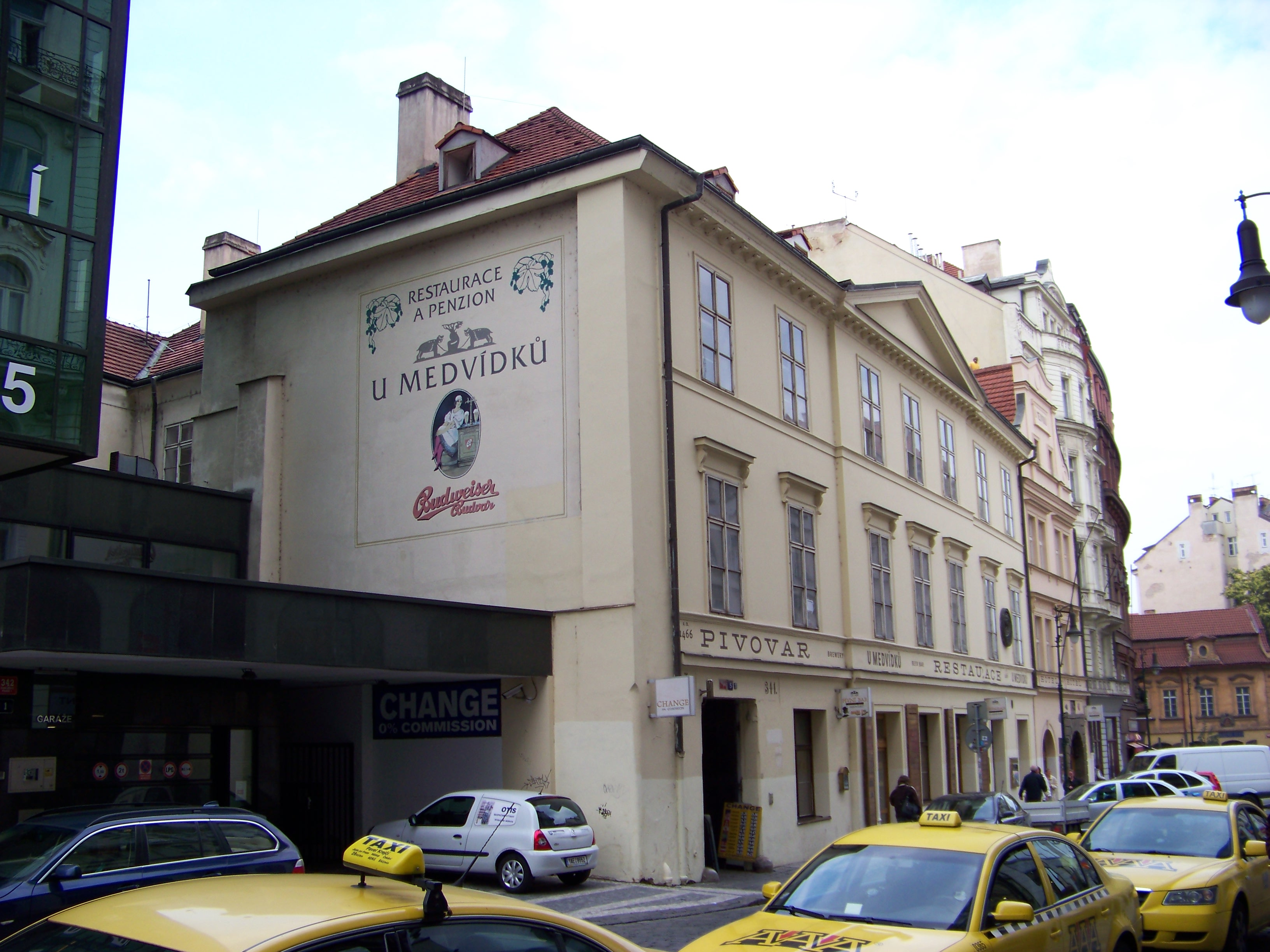
U Medvídků

U Medvídků (formerly U Nedwidku or U černého medvěda, transl. At the Little Bears) is a historical brewery house located in Prague's Old Town. The pub and the brewery ranks among the oldest in Europe.

== History ==
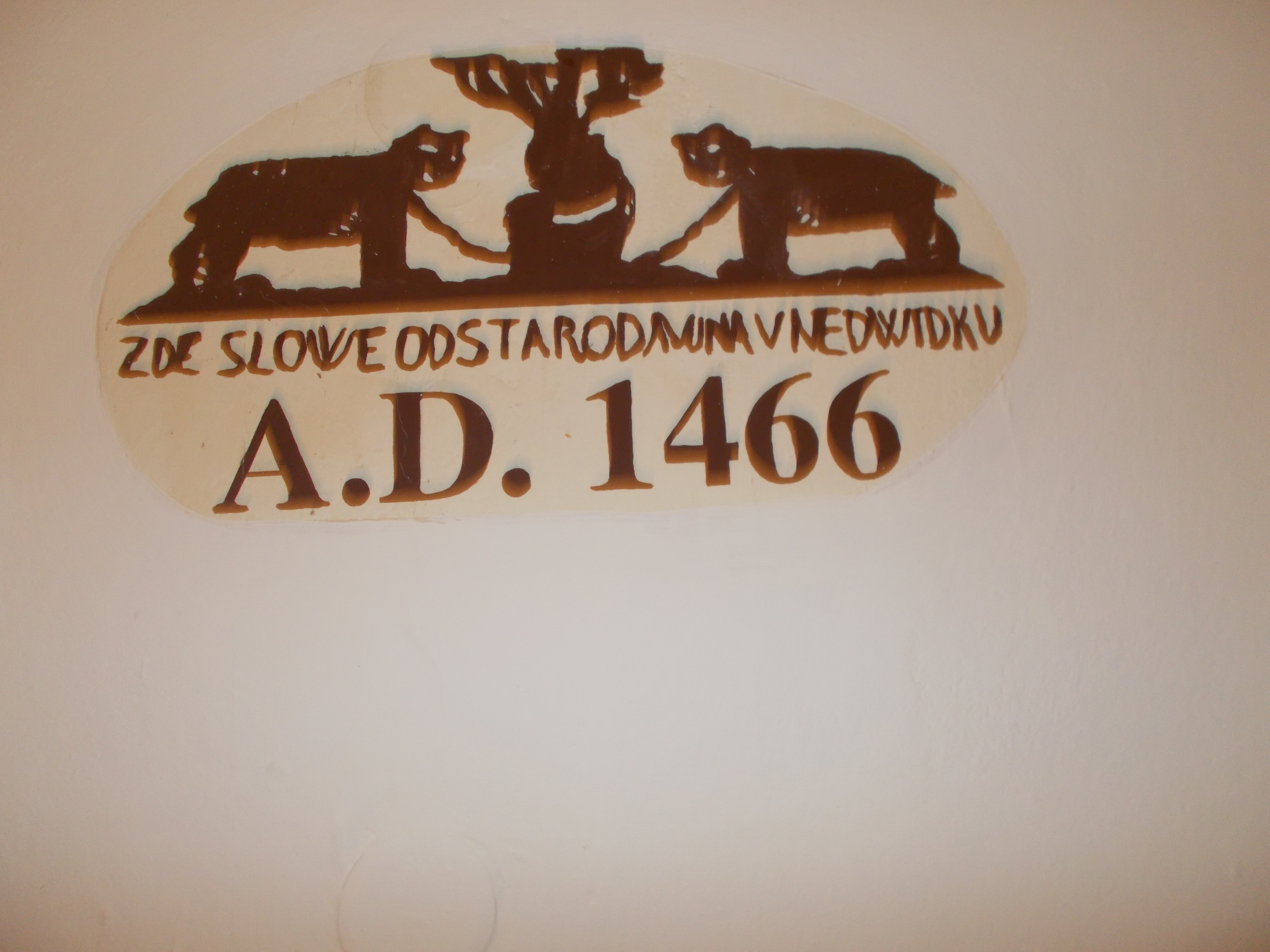
The sign U Medvídků

Archaeologists trace the house's history back at least to the second half of the 13th century, to which time period certain barrel vaults connected to the central pillar can be dated. The house has been documented by written sources since 1404. In 1433, it was bought by Mikuláš sladovník, who acquired the brewing right for beer, and after him the beer was brewed by Jakub Starostka since 1438.

The house was named after later owner Jan Nedwídek, who in 1466 founded a brewery, continuously producing beer until 1898. On the stone portal of the house is preserved the house sign: two black bears, and between them the inscription Zde slowe od starodawna u Nedwidku, with the year 1614, when the house was rebuilt into Renaissance style. After 1898, the owners were no longer able to compete with the emerging industrial breweries and therefore closed their small breweries and founded a municipal Brewery in Holešovice.

At the beginning of the 20th century the first Prague cabaret Tingl-Tangl performed at the house. Since the 1950s, the national enterprise RaJ1 has run the pub. After 1989, the house was returned to its owners, the pub was extended, a new hotel was created, and beer production resumed. The hotel is notable for its preserved Gothic roof trusses and Renaissance painted ceilings.

Budweiser Budvar is served in the pub, as well as unfiltered beers of local production: 1466 (light lager), Medvídkovské bílé (12° wheat beer), Oldgott (13° semi-dark lager), Blackgott (14° dark special), Medvídek (15° light special) and X-BEER 33 (claimed the strongest beer in the world). Originals are also the Beer ice cream and the Pivovice X40 (beer liqueur).

== See also ==
- Beer in the Czech Republic
