= The Nutshell =

Listed pub in Bury St Edmunds, Suffolk, England

- The pub in 2026

General information
- Type: Public house
- Location: 17 The Traverse, Bury St Edmunds, Suffolk, England
- Coordinates: 52.244754°N 0.712703°E
- Year built: Mid-19th century
- Owner: Greene King

Design and construction
- Designations

Listed Building – Grade II
- Official name: The Nutshell public house
- Designated: 12 July 1972
- Reference no.: 1038277

The Nutshell is a Grade II listed public house on The Traverse in Bury St Edmunds, Suffolk, England. Measuring 4.57 by 2.13 m (15 by 7 ft), it is one of the smallest pubs in the United Kingdom. The pub is included in the Campaign for Real Ale (CAMRA)'s National Inventory of Historic Pub Interiors with a three-star rating, and its interior is regarded by CAMRA as being of "outstanding national historic importance".

== History ==
The building is described in its official listing as a mid-19th-century public house. However, the Campaign for Real Ale (CAMRA) records that the premises were occupied by a fruiter's shop in the 1820s before later being converted into a pub. By 1891 it was listed in the census as the "Nutshell Museum & Bar". The premises were previously recorded at 29 Meat Market and, by 1891, were associated with addresses at both 17 The Traverse and 4 The Traverse.

A dried cat, estimated to be around 400 years old, was discovered during building work in 1935 and remains on display in the pub. The object reflects a historical practice whereby animal remains were concealed within buildings for apotropaic purposes.

On 12 July 1972, The Nutshell was designated a Grade II listed building. It is regarded by CAMRA as having an interior of "outstanding national historic importance" and is rated three stars on its National Inventory of Historic Pub Interiors.

The pub measures 4.57 by 2.13 metres (15 by 7 ft), making it one of the smallest in the United Kingdom. In 1984, a reported 102 people were accommodated inside the pub at one time. Until 2016, The Nutshell claimed to be Britain's smallest pub, although this was disputed by several other establishments, including the Smiths Arms at Godmanstone (since closed) and the Lakeside Inn in Southport. As of June 2026, the freehold was owned by Greene King.

== Architecture ==
=== Exterior ===
The building is timber-framed and rendered, with a slate roof and a broad plain eaves cornice. It is arranged over three storeys above a cellar and occupies a corner site, with two sash windows to each upper floor facing The Traverse and a single sash window to each floor on the south-facing return elevation. The first-floor windows have 12-pane sash frames, while those on the second floor have nine panes, all set within flush cased surrounds. The rounded corner is emphasised by a mullioned ground-floor shop front that extends around both elevations and incorporates pilasters, a frieze and cornice, surmounted by an ornate cast-iron cresting.

=== Interior ===
The interior is notable for its exceptionally small size. Large front windows allow most of the interior to be viewed from the street. Historic fittings include an old bar counter, bar-back shelving and simple bench seating set against panelled dado panelling. Access to the upper floor is provided by a narrow staircase, which leads to the pub's toilet.

== See also ==
- Listed buildings in Bury St Edmunds (western part)
