= Listed buildings in Bury St Edmunds (western part) =

Civil Parish in Suffolk, England

Bury St Edmunds is a town and civil parish in the West Suffolk District of Suffolk, England. It contains 737 listed buildings that are recorded in the National Heritage List for England. Of these 32 are grade I, 41 are grade II* and 664 are grade II.

This list is based on the information retrieved online from Historic England. The quantity of listed buildings in Bury requires subdivision into geographically defined lists. This list includes all listed buildings in the western part of the town.

== Key ==
Grade	Criteria
I	Buildings that are of exceptional interest
II*	Particularly important buildings of more than special interest
II	Buildings that are of special interest

== Listing ==
Name	Grade	Location	Type	Completed (Note: The date given is the date used by Historic England as significant for the initial building or that of an important part in the structure's description.)	Date designated	Grid ref. (Note: The grid reference is based on the British national grid reference system, sometimes known as OSGB36, used by the Ordnance Survey.) Geo-coordinates	Notes	Entry number (Note: The "List Entry Number" is a unique number assigned to each listed building and scheduled monument by Historic England.)	Image	Wikidata
1, Abbeygate Street	II	1, Abbeygate Street, Bury St Edmunds			16 June 1989	TL8530064203; 52°14′41″N 0°42′46″E		1021953	1, Abbeygate Street More images	Q26272416
2, Abbeygate Street	II	2, Abbeygate Street, Bury St Edmunds	building		7 August 1952	TL8530864211; 52°14′42″N 0°42′46″E		1021954	2, Abbeygate Street More images	Q26272417
Palmers of Yarmouth	II	9 and 10, Abbeygate Street, Bury St Edmunds			7 August 1952	TL8534764209; 52°14′41″N 0°42′48″E		1031145	Palmers of Yarmouth More images	Q26282497
11, Abbeygate Street	II*	11, Abbeygate Street, Bury St Edmunds	building		7 August 1952	TL8536164212; 52°14′42″N 0°42′49″E		1021955	11, Abbeygate Street More images	Q17540289
12 and 13, Abbeygate	II	12 and 13, Abbeygate, Bury St Edmunds			12 July 1972	TL8537564208; 52°14′41″N 0°42′50″E		1021956	Upload Photo	Q26272418
14, Abbeygate Street	II	14, Abbeygate Street, 15, Baxter Street, Bury St Edmunds			7 August 1952	TL8537764217; 52°14′42″N 0°42′50″E		1021957	14, Abbeygate Street More images	Q26272810
15, Abbeygate	II	15, Abbeygate, Bury St Edmunds			12 July 1972	TL8538864230; 52°14′42″N 0°42′51″E		1021958	Upload Photo	Q26272811
16 and 16a, Abbeygate Street	II	16 and 16a, Abbeygate Street, Bury St Edmunds			12 July 1972	TL8539664224; 52°14′42″N 0°42′51″E		1021959	Upload Photo	Q26272812
17, Abbeygate Street	II	17, Abbeygate Street, Bury St Edmunds			12 July 1972	TL8540064230; 52°14′42″N 0°42′51″E		1328858	Upload Photo	Q26614170
18, Abbeygate Street	II	18, Abbeygate Street, Bury St Edmunds			12 July 1972	TL8540864224; 52°14′42″N 0°42′52″E		1328859	Upload Photo	Q26614171
19 and 20, Abbeygate Street	II	19 and 20, Abbeygate Street, Bury St Edmunds			12 July 1972	TL8542164223; 52°14′42″N 0°42′52″E		1328860	Upload Photo	Q26614172
21, Abbeygate Street	II	21, Abbeygate Street, Bury St Edmunds			12 July 1972	TL8542964250; 52°14′43″N 0°42′53″E		1328861	Upload Photo	Q26614173
22, Abbeygate Street	II	22, Abbeygate Street, Bury St Edmunds			12 July 1972	TL8543364238; 52°14′42″N 0°42′53″E		1328862	Upload Photo	Q26614174
Harpers Music Room	II	23, Abbeygate Street, Bury St Edmunds			12 July 1972	TL8544064224; 52°14′42″N 0°42′53″E		1328863	Upload Photo	Q26614175
6, Lower Baxter Street	II	25, Abbeygate Street, Bury St Edmunds			7 August 1952	TL8545464227; 52°14′42″N 0°42′54″E		1328864	Upload Photo	Q26614176
26, Abbeygate Street	II	26, Abbeygate Street, Bury St Edmunds			12 July 1972	TL8546064228; 52°14′42″N 0°42′54″E		1328865	26, Abbeygate Street More images	Q26614177
27, Abbeygate Street	II	27, Abbeygate Street, Bury St Edmunds			12 July 1972	TL8546464231; 52°14′42″N 0°42′55″E		1328866	27, Abbeygate Street More images	Q26614178
28 and 28a, Abbeygate Street	II*	28 and 28a, Abbeygate Street, Bury St Edmunds			12 July 1972	TL8547164233; 52°14′42″N 0°42′55″E		1328867	Upload Photo	Q17545673
29 and 29a, Abbeygate Street	II	29 and 29a, Abbeygate Street, Bury St Edmunds			12 July 1972	TL8547964233; 52°14′42″N 0°42′55″E		1328868	29 and 29a, Abbeygate Street More images	Q26614179
31 and 32, Abbeygate Street	II*	31 and 32, Abbeygate Street, Bury St Edmunds	building		7 August 1952	TL8549064216; 52°14′41″N 0°42′56″E		1328869	31 and 32, Abbeygate Street More images	Q17545677
33 and 34, Abbeygate Street	II	33 and 34, Abbeygate Street, Bury St Edmunds			18 December 1989	TL8547864212; 52°14′41″N 0°42′55″E		1328870	33 and 34, Abbeygate Street More images	Q26614180
Ridleys	II*	35 and 36, Abbeygate Street, Bury St Edmunds	building		7 August 1952	TL8546264204; 52°14′41″N 0°42′54″E		1328871	Ridleys More images	Q17545684
37, Abbeygate Street	II	37, Abbeygate Street, Bury St Edmunds			7 August 1952	TL8545164192; 52°14′41″N 0°42′54″E		1328872	Upload Photo	Q26614181
38, Abbeygate Street	II	38, Abbeygate Street, Bury St Edmunds			12 July 1972	TL8544164202; 52°14′41″N 0°42′53″E		1328873	38, Abbeygate Street More images	Q26614182
46, Abbeygate Street	II	46, Abbeygate Street, Bury St Edmunds			12 July 1972	TL8537864187; 52°14′41″N 0°42′50″E		1328876	46, Abbeygate Street More images	Q26614185
47 and 48, Abbeygate Street	II	47 and 48, Abbeygate Street, Bury St Edmunds			7 August 1952	TL8537564186; 52°14′41″N 0°42′50″E		1328877	47 and 48, Abbeygate Street More images	Q26614186
49, Abbeygate Street	II*	49, Abbeygate Street, Bury St Edmunds			12 July 1972	TL8536564171; 52°14′40″N 0°42′49″E		1141138	49, Abbeygate Street More images	Q17545345
Barclays Bank	II	52, Abbeygate Street, Bury St Edmunds			12 July 1972	TL8535164163; 52°14′40″N 0°42′49″E		1141139	Barclays Bank More images	Q26433896
Midland Bank	II	53 and 54, Abbeygate Street, Bury St Edmunds			12 July 1972	TL8533364175; 52°14′40″N 0°42′48″E		1141140	Midland Bank More images	Q26433898
55, Abbeygate Street	II	55, Abbeygate Street, Bury St Edmunds			16 October 1995	TL8532264181; 52°14′41″N 0°42′47″E		1141142	Upload Photo	Q26433900
57, Abbeygate Street	II	57, Abbeygate Street, 90, 91 and 92, Whiting Street, Bury St Edmunds			12 July 1972	TL8529964170; 52°14′40″N 0°42′46″E		1141144	57, Abbeygate Street More images	Q26433901
58, Abbeygate Street	II*	58, Abbeygate Street, Bury St Edmunds			7 August 1952	TL8529264173; 52°14′40″N 0°42′45″E		1141145	58, Abbeygate Street More images	Q17545355
59, Abbeygate Street	II	59, Abbeygate Street, Bury St Edmunds	building		11 February 1987	TL8528264165; 52°14′40″N 0°42′45″E		1141147	59, Abbeygate Street More images	Q26433903
60, Abbeygate Street	II	60, Abbeygate Street, Bury St Edmunds			11 February 1987	TL8526864165; 52°14′40″N 0°42′44″E		1141149	60, Abbeygate Street More images	Q26433906
61, Abbeygate Street	II	61, Abbeygate Street, Bury St Edmunds			30 October 1997	TL8525964168; 52°14′40″N 0°42′44″E		1141150	61, Abbeygate Street More images	Q26433908
5, Brentgovel Street	II	5, Brentgovel Street, Bury St Edmunds			7 May 1981	TL8527264421; 52°14′48″N 0°42′45″E		1377007	5, Brentgovel Street More images	Q26657504
14, Brentgovel Street	II	14, Brentgovel Street, Bury St Edmunds			12 July 1972	TL8537264387; 52°14′47″N 0°42′50″E		1377008	14, Brentgovel Street More images	Q26657505
15, 16 and 17, Brentgovel Street	II	15, 16 and 17, Brentgovel Street, Bury St Edmunds			12 March 1996	TL8538364389; 52°14′47″N 0°42′51″E		1377009	15, 16 and 17, Brentgovel Street More images	Q26657506
Kings Arms Public House	II	23, Brentgovel Street, Bury St Edmunds	pub		30 October 1997	TL8540664359; 52°14′46″N 0°42′52″E		1377010	Kings Arms Public House More images	Q26657507
32 and 33, Brentgovel Street	II	32 and 33, Brentgovel Street, Bury St Edmunds			12 July 1972	TL8522764407; 52°14′48″N 0°42′42″E		1377011	32 and 33, Brentgovel Street More images	Q26657508
34, Brentgovel Street	II	34, Brentgovel Street, Bury St Edmunds			30 October 1997	TL8520864409; 52°14′48″N 0°42′41″E		1031114	34, Brentgovel Street More images	Q26282462
The Grapes Public House	II	Brentgovel Street, Bury St Edmunds	pub		30 October 1997	TL8520064438; 52°14′49″N 0°42′41″E		1031115	The Grapes Public House More images	Q26282463
9-12, Bridewell Lane	II	9-12, Bridewell Lane, Bury St Edmunds			12 July 1972	TL8553663918; 52°14′32″N 0°42′58″E		1031116	9-12, Bridewell Lane More images	Q26282465
The Blackbirds	II	14, Bridewell Lane, Bury St Edmunds			12 July 1972	TL8553463933; 52°14′32″N 0°42′58″E		1031117	The Blackbirds More images	Q26282466
Bridewell Cottage	II	15, Bridewell Lane, Bury St Edmunds			12 July 1972	TL8553063946; 52°14′33″N 0°42′58″E		1031118	Bridewell Cottage More images	Q26282467
16 and 18, Bridewell Lane	II	16 and 18, Bridewell Lane, Bury St Edmunds			7 August 1952	TL8552563964; 52°14′33″N 0°42′57″E		1031119	16 and 18, Bridewell Lane More images	Q26282469
23, Bridewell Lane	II	23, Bridewell Lane, Bury St Edmunds			30 October 1997	TL8552063989; 52°14′34″N 0°42′57″E		1031120	23, Bridewell Lane More images	Q26282470
Green King Maltings	II	Bridewell Lane, Bury St Edmunds			30 October 1997	TL8556763817; 52°14′29″N 0°42′59″E		1031121	Green King Maltings More images	Q26282471
Guildhall Feoffment County Primary School and Masters House and Attached Walls and Gates	II	Bridewell Lane, Bury St Edmunds			11 February 1987	TL8553363873; 52°14′30″N 0°42′58″E		1031122	Guildhall Feoffment County Primary School and Masters House and Attached Walls and Gates More images	Q26282472
Roundel Club	II	Bridewell Lane, Bury St Edmunds			12 July 1972	TL8554463992; 52°14′34″N 0°42′58″E		1031123	Roundel Club More images	Q26282473
Red House	II	Bury Road, Bury St Edmunds			25 August 1983	TL8389062668; 52°13′53″N 0°41′29″E		1186982	Upload Photo	Q26482219
Bury St Edmunds Yard Signal Box	II	Bury St Edmunds Yard, Bury St Edmunds Railway Station, Bury St Edmunds			16 May 2013	TL8500665180; 52°15′13″N 0°42′32″E		1414231	Upload Photo	Q26676401
4, 5 and 6, Buttermarket	II	4, 5 and 6, Buttermarket, Bury St Edmunds			12 July 1972	TL8531864224; 52°14′42″N 0°42′47″E		1031124	Upload Photo	Q26282474
7, Buttermarket	II	7, Buttermarket, Bury St Edmunds			12 July 1972	TL8531664233; 52°14′42″N 0°42′47″E		1031125	Upload Photo	Q26282475
8, Buttermarket	II	8, Buttermarket, Bury St Edmunds			12 July 1972	TL8531464238; 52°14′42″N 0°42′47″E		1031126	Upload Photo	Q26282476
Lloyds Bank	II	9, Buttermarket, Bury St Edmunds			7 August 1952	TL8531164251; 52°14′43″N 0°42′47″E		1031127	Upload Photo	Q26282477
Belfast Linen Company and Nationwide Anglia Building Society	II	10, Buttermarket, Bury St Edmunds			12 July 1972	TL8530664270; 52°14′43″N 0°42′46″E		1031128	Upload Photo	Q26282479
12 and 13, Buttermarket	II	12 and 13, Buttermarket, Bury St Edmunds			12 July 1972	TL8529764289; 52°14′44″N 0°42′46″E		1031136	12 and 13, Buttermarket More images	Q26282487
14 and 15, Buttermarket	II	14 and 15, Buttermarket, Bury St Edmunds			12 July 1972	TL8529664306; 52°14′45″N 0°42′46″E		1031139	14 and 15, Buttermarket More images	Q26282491
16, 16a and 17, Buttermarket	II	16, 16a and 17, Buttermarket, Bury St Edmunds			12 July 1972	TL8529364317; 52°14′45″N 0°42′46″E		1031140	16, 16a and 17, Buttermarket More images	Q26282492
20 and 21a, Buttermarket	II	20 and 21a, Buttermarket, Bury St Edmunds	building		12 July 1972	TL8532464343; 52°14′46″N 0°42′47″E		1031141	20 and 21a, Buttermarket More images	Q26282493
25 and 26, Buttermarket	II	25 and 26, Buttermarket, Bury St Edmunds			12 July 1972	TL8532564298; 52°14′44″N 0°42′47″E		1031142	25 and 26, Buttermarket More images	Q26282494
27, 27a and 27b, Buttermarket	II	27, 27a and 27b, Buttermarket, Bury St Edmunds			12 July 1972	TL8533764288; 52°14′44″N 0°42′48″E		1031143	Upload Photo	Q26282495
35, Buttermarket	II	35, Buttermarket, Bury St Edmunds			18 May 2001	TL8533964241; 52°14′42″N 0°42′48″E		1271517	Upload Photo	Q26561460
The Suffolk Hotel	II	36, Buttermarket, Bury St Edmunds			7 August 1952	TL8534064229; 52°14′42″N 0°42′48″E		1031144	The Suffolk Hotel More images	Q26282496
28-31, Cannon Street	II	28-31, Cannon Street, Bury St Edmunds, Pea Porridge Green			12 July 1952	TL8538464733; 52°14′58″N 0°42′51″E		1248037	Upload Photo	Q26540283
37, 38 and 39, Cannon Street	II	37, 38 and 39, Cannon Street, Bury St Edmunds, Pea Porridge Green			12 July 1972	TL8540164780; 52°15′00″N 0°42′52″E		1248040	Upload Photo	Q26540286
46 and 47, Cannon Street	II	46 and 47, Cannon Street, Bury St Edmunds, Pea Porridge Green			12 July 1972	TL8542064815; 52°15′01″N 0°42′53″E		1248042	Upload Photo	Q26540287
Dolphin House	II	50, Cannon Street, Bury St Edmunds, Pea Porridge Green			12 July 1972	TL8542564831; 52°15′01″N 0°42′54″E		1248043	Upload Photo	Q26540288
St Edmunds Head Public House and Stable Block	II	86, Cannon Street, Bury St Edmunds, Pea Porridge Green	brewpub		12 July 1972	TL8541964742; 52°14′59″N 0°42′53″E		1248044	St Edmunds Head Public House and Stable Block More images	Q7754815
1 and 1a, Churchgate Street	II	1 and 1a, Churchgate Street, Bury St Edmunds			12 July 1972	TL8526764029; 52°14′36″N 0°42′44″E		1248049	1 and 1a, Churchgate Street More images	Q26540293
2, Churchgate Street	II	2, Churchgate Street, Bury St Edmunds			12 July 1972	TL8527864033; 52°14′36″N 0°42′44″E		1248050	2, Churchgate Street More images	Q26540294
12, Churchgate Street	II	12, Churchgate Street, Bury St Edmunds			12 July 1972	TL8533464043; 52°14′36″N 0°42′47″E		1248112	Upload Photo	Q26540352
13, 14 and 15, Churchgate Street	II	13, 14 and 15, Churchgate Street, Bury St Edmunds			12 July 1972	TL8535164048; 52°14′36″N 0°42′48″E		1248113	13, 14 and 15, Churchgate Street More images	Q26540353
16 and 17, Churchgate Street	II	16 and 17, Churchgate Street, Bury St Edmunds			12 July 1972	TL8538064052; 52°14′36″N 0°42′50″E		1248114	16 and 17, Churchgate Street More images	Q26540354
18, 19 and 20, Churchgate Street	II	18, 19 and 20, Churchgate Street, Bury St Edmunds			12 July 1972	TL8539064052; 52°14′36″N 0°42′50″E		1248115	18, 19 and 20, Churchgate Street More images	Q26540355
Tools and Things	II	21, Churchgate Street, Bury St Edmunds			12 July 1972	TL8542464064; 52°14′37″N 0°42′52″E		1248116	Tools and Things More images	Q26540356
22, 23 and 24, Churchgate Street	II	22, 23 and 24, Churchgate Street, Bury St Edmunds			12 July 1972	TL8543464062; 52°14′37″N 0°42′53″E		1248117	22, 23 and 24, Churchgate Street More images	Q26540357
25 and 26, Churchgate Street	II	25 and 26, Churchgate Street, Bury St Edmunds			20 April 1971	TL8544564061; 52°14′37″N 0°42′53″E		1248118	25 and 26, Churchgate Street More images	Q26540358
27, Churchgate Street	II	27, Churchgate Street, Bury St Edmunds			7 August 1952	TL8545764068; 52°14′37″N 0°42′54″E		1248119	27, Churchgate Street More images	Q26540359
28, Churchgate Street	II	28, Churchgate Street, Bury St Edmunds			12 July 1972	TL8546564068; 52°14′37″N 0°42′54″E		1248120	28, Churchgate Street More images	Q26540360
29, Churchgate Street	II	29, Churchgate Street, Bury St Edmunds			12 July 1972	TL8547264069; 52°14′37″N 0°42′55″E		1248121	29, Churchgate Street More images	Q26540361
30, Churchgate Street	II	30, Churchgate Street, Bury St Edmunds			12 July 1972	TL8547764070; 52°14′37″N 0°42′55″E		1248122	30, Churchgate Street More images	Q26540362
31, Churchgate Street	II	31, Churchgate Street, Bury St Edmunds			12 July 1972	TL8548264071; 52°14′37″N 0°42′55″E		1248123	31, Churchgate Street More images	Q26540363
32 and 33, Churchgate Street	II	32 and 33, Churchgate Street, Bury St Edmunds			12 July 1972	TL8549064073; 52°14′37″N 0°42′56″E		1248124	32 and 33, Churchgate Street More images	Q26540364
34, Churchgate Street	II	34, Churchgate Street, Bury St Edmunds			30 October 1997	TL8549864075; 52°14′37″N 0°42′56″E		1248203	34, Churchgate Street More images	Q26540435
35, Churchgate Street	II	35, Churchgate Street, Bury St Edmunds			7 August 1952	TL8551064077; 52°14′37″N 0°42′57″E		1248205	35, Churchgate Street More images	Q26540437
36, Churchgate Street	II	36, Churchgate Street, Bury St Edmunds			7 August 1952	TL8552364082; 52°14′37″N 0°42′57″E		1248208	36, Churchgate Street More images	Q26540439
38, Churchgate Street	II*	38, Churchgate Street, Bury St Edmunds			7 August 1952	TL8552364062; 52°14′36″N 0°42′57″E		1248210	Upload Photo	Q17545581
The Queens Head Public House	II	38a and 39, Churchgate Street, Bury St Edmunds	pub		12 July 1972	TL8549564053; 52°14′36″N 0°42′56″E		1248211	The Queens Head Public House More images	Q26540441
46, Churchgate Street	II	46, Churchgate Street, Bury St Edmunds			12 July 1972	TL8544164042; 52°14′36″N 0°42′53″E		1248212	46, Churchgate Street More images	Q26540442
47, Churchgate Street	II	47, Churchgate Street, Bury St Edmunds			12 July 1972	TL8543664042; 52°14′36″N 0°42′53″E		1248213	47, Churchgate Street More images	Q26540443
48, 49 and 49a, Churchgate Street	II*	48, 49 and 49a, Churchgate Street, Bury St Edmunds			12 July 1972	TL8543064041; 52°14′36″N 0°42′52″E		1248214	48, 49 and 49a, Churchgate Street More images	Q17545586
50, Churchgate Street	II	50, Churchgate Street, Bury St Edmunds			12 July 1972	TL8540564036; 52°14′36″N 0°42′51″E		1248215	50, Churchgate Street More images	Q26540444
53 and 54, Churchgate Street	II	53 and 54, Churchgate Street, Bury St Edmunds			12 July 1972	TL8538464032; 52°14′36″N 0°42′50″E		1248216	Upload Photo	Q26540445
55 and 56, Churchgate Street	II	55 and 56, Churchgate Street, Bury St Edmunds			12 July 1972	TL8537264031; 52°14′36″N 0°42′49″E		1248217	Upload Photo	Q26540446
57, Churchgate Street	II	57, Churchgate Street, Bury St Edmunds			12 July 1972	TL8536064028; 52°14′36″N 0°42′49″E		1248218	Upload Photo	Q26540447
58, Churchgate Street	II	58, Churchgate Street, Bury St Edmunds			12 July 1972	TL8535464025; 52°14′35″N 0°42′48″E		1248219	Upload Photo	Q26540448
K6 Telephone Kiosk	II	Churchgate Street, Bury St Edmunds			26 October 1987	TL8549864060; 52°14′36″N 0°42′56″E		1248300	K6 Telephone Kiosk More images	Q26681283
Unitarian Chapel	I	Churchgate Street, Bury St Edmunds	chapel		7 August 1952	TL8536764057; 52°14′37″N 0°42′49″E		1248301	Unitarian Chapel More images	Q17526740
Bollards at East End	II	College Lane, Bury St Edmunds			12 July 1972	TL8540863938; 52°14′33″N 0°42′51″E		1248303	Bollards at East End More images	Q26540524
Bollards at West End	II	College Lane, Bury St Edmunds			12 July 1972	TL8533463922; 52°14′32″N 0°42′47″E		1248304	Upload Photo	Q26540525
Numbers 30 and 31, College Lane	II	College Lane, Bury St Edmunds			19 May 2005	TL8531963914; 52°14′32″N 0°42′46″E		1407480	Upload Photo	Q26675936
7a and 8, College Road	II	7a and 8, College Road, Bury St Edmunds			30 October 1997	TL8542263936; 52°14′33″N 0°42′52″E		1248302	7a and 8, College Road More images	Q26540523
2 and 3, College Street	II	2 and 3, College Street, Bury St Edmunds			12 July 1972	TL8542764032; 52°14′36″N 0°42′52″E		1248305	2 and 3, College Street More images	Q26540526
4 and 5, College Street	II	4 and 5, College Street, Bury St Edmunds			12 July 1972	TL8543364009; 52°14′35″N 0°42′53″E		1248306	4 and 5, College Street More images	Q26540527
7, College Street	II	7, College Street, Bury St Edmunds			12 July 1972	TL8543563997; 52°14′34″N 0°42′53″E		1248307	7, College Street More images	Q26540528
8-11, College Street	II	8-11, College Street, Bury St Edmunds			7 August 1952	TL8543763988; 52°14′34″N 0°42′53″E		1248308	8-11, College Street More images	Q26540529
Angel Cottage, Davors Cottage	II	20, College Street, Bury St Edmunds			12 July 1972	TL8545463922; 52°14′32″N 0°42′53″E		1248309	Angel Cottage, Davors Cottage More images	Q26540530
21, College Street	II	21, College Street, Bury St Edmunds			12 July 1972	TL8546063912; 52°14′32″N 0°42′54″E		1248310	21, College Street More images	Q26540531
22-26, College Street	II	22-26, College Street, Bury St Edmunds			12 July 1972	TL8546263897; 52°14′31″N 0°42′54″E		1248311	22-26, College Street More images	Q26540532
Greene King Maltings on South East Corner of College Street	II	Westgate Street, Bury St. Edmunds			12 July 1972	TL8549163798; 52°14′28″N 0°42′55″E		1142283	Greene King Maltings on South East Corner of College Street More images	Q26435090
58-61, Westgate Street	II	34, College Street, Bury St Edmunds			12 July 1972	TL8546363797; 52°14′28″N 0°42′54″E		1142332	58-61, Westgate Street More images	Q26435143
Highbury Cottage	II	40, College Street, Bury St Edmunds			12 July 1972	TL8545463860; 52°14′30″N 0°42′53″E		1076944	Highbury Cottage More images	Q26342896
St Enodoc (number 42)	II	42 and 43, College Street, Bury St Edmunds			12 July 1972	TL8544963866; 52°14′30″N 0°42′53″E		1076945	St Enodoc (number 42) More images	Q26342901
The Old Angel	II	44, College Street, Bury St Edmunds			12 July 1972	TL8544463881; 52°14′31″N 0°42′53″E		1076946	The Old Angel More images	Q26342905
46, College Street	II	46, College Street, Bury St Edmunds			12 July 1972	TL8544263895; 52°14′31″N 0°42′53″E		1076947	46, College Street More images	Q26342909
47 and 47a, College Street	II	47 and 47a, College Street, Bury St Edmunds			12 July 1972	TL8544163901; 52°14′31″N 0°42′53″E		1076948	47 and 47a, College Street More images	Q26342912
48, College Street	II	48, College Street, Bury St Edmunds			12 July 1972	TL8543663910; 52°14′32″N 0°42′53″E		1076949	48, College Street More images	Q26342916
49, College Street	II	49, College Street, Bury St Edmunds			12 July 1972	TL8543663916; 52°14′32″N 0°42′53″E		1076950	49, College Street More images	Q26342919
The Old Beehive	II	50, College Street, Bury St Edmunds			12 July 1972	TL8543463926; 52°14′32″N 0°42′52″E		1076951	The Old Beehive More images	Q26342923
51 and 52 College Street and 7 College Lane, Bury St Edmunds	II	51 and 52, College Street, IP33 1NL, Bury St Edmunds			12 July 1972	TL8543463935; 52°14′32″N 0°42′52″E		1076952	51 and 52 College Street and 7 College Lane, Bury St Edmunds More images	Q26342927
60, College Street	II	60, College Street, Bury St Edmunds			12 July 1972	TL8541564002; 52°14′35″N 0°42′52″E		1076953	60, College Street More images	Q26342930
61 and 62, College Street	II	61 and 62, College Street, Bury St Edmunds			12 July 1972	TL8541064034; 52°14′36″N 0°42′51″E		1076954	61 and 62, College Street More images	Q26342934
Stable and Wall Between Numbers 36 and 40 (number 36 Not Included)	II	College Street, Bury St Edmunds			12 July 1972	TL8546163835; 52°14′29″N 0°42′54″E		1248312	Stable and Wall Between Numbers 36 and 40 (number 36 Not Included) More images	Q26540533
15, Cornhill	II	15, Cornhill, Bury St Edmunds	building		30 October 1997	TL8521664316; 52°14′45″N 0°42′42″E		1076955	15, Cornhill More images	Q26342937
27, Cornhill	II	27, Cornhill, Bury St Edmunds			12 July 1972	TL8523064389; 52°14′47″N 0°42′43″E		1076922	Upload Photo	Q26342833
28 and 28a, Cornhill	II	28 and 28a, Cornhill, Bury St Edmunds			12 July 1972	TL8522064397; 52°14′48″N 0°42′42″E		1076923	Upload Photo	Q26342837
Moyses Hall	I	41, Cornhill, Bury St Edmunds	museum building		7 August 1952	TL8530164370; 52°14′47″N 0°42′46″E		1076931	Moyses Hall More images	Q17526591
Number 42 (east half)	II	42, Cornhill, Bury St Edmunds			18 December 1989	TL8531064386; 52°14′47″N 0°42′47″E		1076924	Number 42 (east half) More images	Q26342840
Number 42 (west half)	II	42, Cornhill, Bury St Edmunds			18 December 1989	TL8529964388; 52°14′47″N 0°42′46″E		1076925	Number 42 (west half) More images	Q26342844
43a and 43b, Cornhill	II	43a and 43b, Cornhill, Bury St Edmunds	building		12 July 1972	TL8532664359; 52°14′46″N 0°42′48″E		1076926	43a and 43b, Cornhill More images	Q26342847
Boer War Memorial	II	Cornhill, Bury St Edmunds	war memorial		30 October 1997	TL8527464342; 52°14′46″N 0°42′45″E		1076927	Boer War Memorial More images	Q26342851
Corn Exchange	II	Cornhill, Bury St Edmunds	corn exchange		7 August 1952	TL8526664216; 52°14′42″N 0°42′44″E		1076928	Corn Exchange More images	Q26342854
Former Public Library	II	Cornhill, Bury St Edmunds			7 August 1952	TL8525764270; 52°14′44″N 0°42′44″E		1076929	Former Public Library More images	Q26342858
Market Cross	I	Cornhill, Bury St Edmunds	building		7 August 1952	TL8525364308; 52°14′45″N 0°42′44″E		1076930	Market Cross More images	Q17526586
10, Cullum Road	II	10, Cullum Road, Bury St Edmunds			8 February 1994	TL8528263703; 52°14′25″N 0°42′44″E		1075222	Upload Photo	Q26338151
Fornham Road Free Church	II	Fornham Road, Bury St Edmunds	church building		30 October 1997	TL8534265206; 52°15′14″N 0°42′50″E		1363684	Fornham Road Free Church More images	Q26645505
St Saviours Hospital	I	Fornham Road, Bury St Edmunds	hospital building		7 August 1952	TL8535665254; 52°15′15″N 0°42′51″E		1363685	St Saviours Hospital More images	Q17526809
2, Friars Lane	II	2, Friars Lane, Bury St Edmunds			2 September 1985	TL8543563742; 52°14′26″N 0°42′52″E		1363686	Upload Photo	Q26645506
7 and 9, Garland Street	II	7 and 9, Garland Street, Bury St Edmunds			12 July 1972	TL8541064421; 52°14′48″N 0°42′52″E		1363687	7 and 9, Garland Street More images	Q26645507
12, Garland Street	II	12, Garland Street, Bury St Edmunds			12 July 1972	TL8540664467; 52°14′50″N 0°42′52″E		1363688	12, Garland Street More images	Q26645508
13, Garland Street	II	13, Garland Street, Bury St Edmunds			12 July 1972	TL8540664473; 52°14′50″N 0°42′52″E		1363689	13, Garland Street More images	Q26645509
Horndon House and Stable Block	II	62 and 62a, Garland Street, Bury St Edmunds			7 August 1952	TL8542464472; 52°14′50″N 0°42′53″E		1363690	Horndon House and Stable Block More images	Q26645511
Eagle House	II	63, Garland Street, Bury St Edmunds			12 July 1972	TL8543664431; 52°14′49″N 0°42′54″E		1363691	Eagle House More images	Q26645512
Baptist Chapel	II	Garland Street, Bury St Edmunds			12 July 1972	TL8543264451; 52°14′49″N 0°42′53″E		1363692	Baptist Chapel More images	Q26645513
1, Guildhall Street	II	1, Guildhall Street, Bury St Edmunds			12 July 1972	TL8525364169; 52°14′40″N 0°42′43″E		1363693	1, Guildhall Street More images	Q26645514
7, Guildhall Street	II	7, Guildhall Street, Bury St Edmunds			12 July 1972	TL8525664136; 52°14′39″N 0°42′43″E		1363694	7, Guildhall Street More images	Q26645515
8 and 9, Guildhall Street	II	8 and 9, Guildhall Street, Bury St Edmunds			12 July 1972	TL8526464131; 52°14′39″N 0°42′44″E		1363695	8 and 9, Guildhall Street More images	Q26645516
10, Guildhall Street	II	10, Guildhall Street, Bury St Edmunds			12 July 1972	TL8526764118; 52°14′39″N 0°42′44″E		1363696	10, Guildhall Street More images	Q26645517
11, Guildhall Street	II	11, Guildhall Street, Bury St Edmunds			12 July 1972	TL8526364109; 52°14′38″N 0°42′44″E		1363697	11, Guildhall Street More images	Q26645518
14, Guildhall Street	II	14, Guildhall Street, Bury St Edmunds			12 July 1972	TL8526964038; 52°14′36″N 0°42′44″E		1363698	14, Guildhall Street More images	Q26645519
15, Guildhall Street	II	15, Guildhall Street, Bury St Edmunds			12 July 1972	TL8527564016; 52°14′35″N 0°42′44″E		1363699	Upload Photo	Q26645520
17, Guildhall Street	II	17, Guildhall Street, Bury St Edmunds			7 August 1952	TL8527264004; 52°14′35″N 0°42′44″E		1363700	17, Guildhall Street More images	Q26645521
18 and 19, Guildhall Street	II	18 and 19, Guildhall Street, Bury St Edmunds			7 August 1952	TL8527463990; 52°14′34″N 0°42′44″E		1363701	18 and 19, Guildhall Street More images	Q26645522
20 and 21, Guildhall Street	II	20 and 21, Guildhall Street, Bury St Edmunds			12 July 1972	TL8527463979; 52°14′34″N 0°42′44″E		1363702	20 and 21, Guildhall Street More images	Q26645523
22 and 23, Guildhall Street	II	22 and 23, Guildhall Street, Bury St Edmunds			7 August 1952	TL8527963970; 52°14′34″N 0°42′44″E		1363703	22 and 23, Guildhall Street More images	Q26645524
24, 25 and 26, Guildhall Street	II	24, 25 and 26, Guildhall Street, Bury St Edmunds			12 July 1972	TL8528163946; 52°14′33″N 0°42′44″E		1363727	Upload Photo	Q26645544
27, Guildhall Street	II	27, Guildhall Street, Bury St Edmunds			12 July 1972	TL8528363939; 52°14′33″N 0°42′45″E		1363728	27, Guildhall Street More images	Q26645545
28 and 29, Guildhall Street	II	28 and 29, Guildhall Street, Bury St Edmunds			12 July 1972	TL8528663935; 52°14′33″N 0°42′45″E		1363729	28 and 29, Guildhall Street More images	Q26645546
34, Guildhall Street	II	34, Guildhall Street, Bury St Edmunds			12 July 1972	TL8529263887; 52°14′31″N 0°42′45″E		1363730	34, Guildhall Street More images	Q26645547
35, Guildhall Street	II	35, Guildhall Street, Bury St Edmunds			12 July 1972	TL8529463862; 52°14′30″N 0°42′45″E		1363731	35, Guildhall Street More images	Q26645548
46, Guildhall Street	II	46, Guildhall Street, Bury St Edmunds			12 July 1972	TL8530263811; 52°14′29″N 0°42′45″E		1363732	46, Guildhall Street More images	Q26645549
Warwick House	II	47, Guildhall Street, Bury St Edmunds			12 July 1972	TL8530163797; 52°14′28″N 0°42′45″E		1363733	Warwick House More images	Q26645550
50 and 51, Guildhall Street	II	50 and 51, Guildhall Street, Bury St Edmunds			7 August 1972	TL8528463784; 52°14′28″N 0°42′44″E		1363734	50 and 51, Guildhall Street More images	Q26645551
52 and 53, Guildhall Street	II	52 and 53, Guildhall Street, Bury St Edmunds			12 July 1972	TL8528363794; 52°14′28″N 0°42′44″E		1363735	52 and 53, Guildhall Street More images	Q26645552
54, Guildhall Street	II	54, Guildhall Street, Bury St Edmunds			12 July 1972	TL8528263805; 52°14′28″N 0°42′44″E		1363736	54, Guildhall Street More images	Q26645553
55c, Guildhall Street	II	55c, Guildhall Street, Bury St Edmunds			12 July 1972	TL8528663820; 52°14′29″N 0°42′44″E		1363737	55c, Guildhall Street More images	Q26645554
56, Guildhall Street	II	56, Guildhall Street, Bury St Edmunds			12 July 1972	TL8528163823; 52°14′29″N 0°42′44″E		1363738	56, Guildhall Street More images	Q26645555
57, Guildhall Street	II	57, Guildhall Street, Bury St Edmunds			12 July 1972	TL8527863831; 52°14′29″N 0°42′44″E		1363739	57, Guildhall Street More images	Q26645556
59 and 60, Guildhall Street	II	59 and 60, Guildhall Street, Bury St Edmunds			12 July 1972	TL8527863842; 52°14′30″N 0°42′44″E		1363740	59 and 60, Guildhall Street More images	Q26645557
61, Guildhall Street	II	61, Guildhall Street, Bury St Edmunds			12 July 1972	TL8527763851; 52°14′30″N 0°42′44″E		1363741	61, Guildhall Street More images	Q26645558
62 and 63, Guildhall Street	II	62 and 63, Guildhall Street, Bury St Edmunds			12 July 1972	TL8527663854; 52°14′30″N 0°42′44″E		1363742	62 and 63, Guildhall Street More images	Q26645559
Royal British Legion Club	II	64 and 65, Guildhall Street, Bury St Edmunds			12 July 1972	TL8526763873; 52°14′31″N 0°42′44″E		1363743	Royal British Legion Club More images	Q26645560
66 and 67, Guildhall Street	II	66 and 67, Guildhall Street, Bury St Edmunds			7 August 1952	TL8527063890; 52°14′31″N 0°42′44″E		1363744	66 and 67, Guildhall Street More images	Q26645561
68, Guildhall Street	II	68, Guildhall Street, Bury St Edmunds			12 July 1972	TL8526063902; 52°14′32″N 0°42′43″E		1363704	68, Guildhall Street More images	Q26645525
The Black Boy Public House	II	69, Guildhall Street, Bury St Edmunds	pub		12 July 1972	TL8526063919; 52°14′32″N 0°42′43″E		1363705	The Black Boy Public House More images	Q26645526
70, Guildhall Street	II	70, Guildhall Street, Bury St Edmunds			7 August 1952	TL8526063930; 52°14′33″N 0°42′43″E		1363706	70, Guildhall Street More images	Q26645527
71, Guildhall Street	II	71, Guildhall Street, Bury St Edmunds			7 August 1952	TL8525763951; 52°14′33″N 0°42′43″E		1363707	71, Guildhall Street More images	Q26645528
72, Guildhall Street	II	72, Guildhall Street, Bury St Edmunds			7 August 1952	TL8525763962; 52°14′34″N 0°42′43″E		1363708	72, Guildhall Street More images	Q26645529
73, Guildhall Street	II	73, Guildhall Street, Bury St Edmunds			7 August 1952	TL8525563970; 52°14′34″N 0°42′43″E		1363709	73, Guildhall Street More images	Q26645530
Portland House	II	74, Guildhall Street, Bury St Edmunds			7 August 1952	TL8525463984; 52°14′34″N 0°42′43″E		1363710	Portland House More images	Q26645531
75, Guildhall Street	II	75, Guildhall Street, Bury St Edmunds			7 August 1952	TL8525263991; 52°14′35″N 0°42′43″E		1363711	75, Guildhall Street More images	Q26645532
76, Guildhall Street	II	76, Guildhall Street, Bury St Edmunds			12 July 1972	TL8525264001; 52°14′35″N 0°42′43″E		1363712	76, Guildhall Street More images	Q26645533
76a, Guildhall Street	II	76a, Guildhall Street, Bury St Edmunds			12 July 1972	TL8523964000; 52°14′35″N 0°42′42″E		1363713	Upload Photo	Q26645534
77, Guildhall Street	II	77, Guildhall Street, Bury St Edmunds			12 July 1972	TL8524964010; 52°14′35″N 0°42′43″E		1363714	77, Guildhall Street More images	Q26645535
78 and 78a, Guildhall Street	II	78 and 78a, Guildhall Street, Bury St Edmunds			7 August 1952	TL8524864014; 52°14′35″N 0°42′43″E		1363715	78 and 78a, Guildhall Street More images	Q26645536
79, Guildhall Street	II*	79, Guildhall Street, Bury St Edmunds			7 August 1952	TL8524864026; 52°14′36″N 0°42′43″E		1363716	Upload Photo	Q17545710
80, Guildhall Street	II*	80, Guildhall Street, Bury St Edmunds			7 August 1952	TL8524564046; 52°14′36″N 0°42′43″E		1363717	80, Guildhall Street More images	Q17545717
81, Guildhall Street	I	81, Guildhall Street, Bury St Edmunds	building		7 August 1952	TL8524264068; 52°14′37″N 0°42′43″E		1363718	81, Guildhall Street More images	Q17526811
84, Guildhall Street	II	84, Guildhall Street, Bury St Edmunds			7 August 1952	TL8523764115; 52°14′39″N 0°42′42″E		1363719	84, Guildhall Street More images	Q26645537
85, Guildhall Street	II	85, Guildhall Street, Bury St Edmunds			7 August 1952	TL8522864125; 52°14′39″N 0°42′42″E		1363720	85, Guildhall Street More images	Q26645538
86, Guildhall Street	II	86, Guildhall Street, Bury St Edmunds			7 August 1952	TL8524364132; 52°14′39″N 0°42′43″E		1363721	86, Guildhall Street More images	Q26645539
87, Guildhall Street	II	87, Guildhall Street, Bury St Edmunds			12 July 1972	TL8522864144; 52°14′39″N 0°42′42″E		1363722	87, Guildhall Street More images	Q26645540
88 and 88a, Guildhall Street	II	88 and 88a, Guildhall Street, Bury St Edmunds			7 August 1952	TL8523464160; 52°14′40″N 0°42′42″E		1363723	88 and 88a, Guildhall Street More images	Q26645541
89, Guildhall Street	II	89, Guildhall Street, Bury St Edmunds			12 July 1972	TL8523764170; 52°14′40″N 0°42′43″E		1363724	89, Guildhall Street More images	Q26645542
Royal Bank of Scotland	II	90, Guildhall Street, Bury St Edmunds			12 July 1972	TL8523564180; 52°14′41″N 0°42′42″E		1363725	Royal Bank of Scotland More images	Q26645543
The Guildhall and Attached Railings	I	Guildhall Street, Bury St Edmunds	guild house		7 August 1952	TL8526864059; 52°14′37″N 0°42′44″E		1363726	The Guildhall and Attached Railings More images	Q17526813
The Lodge	II	65, Hardwick Lane, Bury St Edmunds			12 July 1972	TL8544562820; 52°13′56″N 0°42′51″E		1246709	Upload Photo	Q26539089
Hardwick Haven	II	112, Hardwick Lane, Bury St Edmunds			12 July 1972	TL8495263029; 52°14′04″N 0°42′25″E		1246710	Upload Photo	Q26539090
44a, Abbeygate Street	II	1 and 1a, Hatter Street, Bury St Edmunds			30 October 1997	TL8540164193; 52°14′41″N 0°42′51″E		1328874	44a, Abbeygate Street More images	Q26614183
3, Hatter Street	II	3, Hatter Street, Bury St Edmunds			12 July 1972	TL8541064159; 52°14′40″N 0°42′52″E		1246711	3, Hatter Street More images	Q26539091
4, Hatter Street	II	4, Hatter Street, Bury St Edmunds			12 July 1972	TL8541164149; 52°14′39″N 0°42′52″E		1246712	4, Hatter Street More images	Q26539092
Chantry House	II	5, Hatter Street, Bury St Edmunds			7 August 1952	TL8541764123; 52°14′39″N 0°42′52″E		1246714	Chantry House More images	Q26539094
6, Hatter Street	II	6, Hatter Street, Bury St Edmunds			7 August 1952	TL8542164106; 52°14′38″N 0°42′52″E		1246715	6, Hatter Street More images	Q26539095
7 and 8, Hatter Street	II	7 and 8, Hatter Street, Bury St Edmunds			7 August 1952	TL8542264087; 52°14′37″N 0°42′52″E		1246716	7 and 8, Hatter Street More images	Q26539096
9, Hatter Street	II	9, Hatter Street, Bury St Edmunds			12 July 1972	TL8542464077; 52°14′37″N 0°42′52″E		1246717	Upload Photo	Q26539097
10, Hatter Street	II	10, Hatter Street, Bury St Edmunds			12 July 1972	TL8542564072; 52°14′37″N 0°42′52″E		1246719	10, Hatter Street More images	Q26539099
13, Hatter Street	II	13, Hatter Street, Bury St Edmunds			12 July 1972	TL8540464054; 52°14′36″N 0°42′51″E		1246720	13, Hatter Street More images	Q26539100
14, Hatter Street	II	14, Hatter Street, Bury St Edmunds			12 July 1972	TL8540064060; 52°14′37″N 0°42′51″E		1246721	14, Hatter Street More images	Q26539101
15, Hatter Street	II	15, Hatter Street, Bury St Edmunds			12 July 1972	TL8539964067; 52°14′37″N 0°42′51″E		1022529	15, Hatter Street More images	Q26272455
16 and 17, Hatter Street	II	16 and 17, Hatter Street, Bury St Edmunds			7 August 1952	TL8540064072; 52°14′37″N 0°42′51″E		1022530	16 and 17, Hatter Street More images	Q26272456
18 and 18a, Hatter Street	II	18 and 18a, Hatter Street, Bury St Edmunds			7 August 1952	TL8539764089; 52°14′38″N 0°42′51″E		1022531	18 and 18a, Hatter Street More images	Q26272457
19, Hatter Street	II	19, Hatter Street, Bury St Edmunds			12 July 1972	TL8539764099; 52°14′38″N 0°42′51″E		1022532	19, Hatter Street More images	Q26272458
20 and 20a, Hatter Street	II	20 and 20a, Hatter Street, Bury St Edmunds			7 August 1952	TL8539564108; 52°14′38″N 0°42′51″E		1022533	20 and 20a, Hatter Street More images	Q26272459
21, Hatter Street	II	21, Hatter Street, Bury St Edmunds			12 July 1972	TL8539764114; 52°14′38″N 0°42′51″E		1022534	21, Hatter Street More images	Q26272460
Langton House	II	22a, 22 and 22b, Hatter Street, Bury St Edmunds			12 July 1972	TL8538764137; 52°14′39″N 0°42′50″E		1022535	Langton House More images	Q26272461
23 and 24, Hatter Street	II	23 and 24, Hatter Street, Bury St Edmunds			12 July 1972	TL8538964146; 52°14′39″N 0°42′51″E		1022536	23 and 24, Hatter Street More images	Q26272462
25 and 26, Hatter Street	II	25 and 26, Hatter Street, Bury St Edmunds			12 July 1972	TL8538264157; 52°14′40″N 0°42′50″E		1022537	25 and 26, Hatter Street More images	Q26272463
45, Abbeygate Street	II	28, Hatter Street, Bury St Edmunds			12 July 1972	TL8538564190; 52°14′41″N 0°42′50″E		1328875	45, Abbeygate Street More images	Q26614184
28a, Hatter Street	II	28a, Hatter Street, Bury St Edmunds			12 July 1972	TL8538664179; 52°14′40″N 0°42′50″E		1022538	28a, Hatter Street More images	Q26272464
11, High Baxter Street	II	11, High Baxter Street, Bury St Edmunds			12 March 1996	TL8538264292; 52°14′44″N 0°42′50″E		1022539	Upload Photo	Q26272466
Home Farm House	II	77, Home Farm Lane, Bury St Edmunds			12 July 1972	TL8554862124; 52°13′34″N 0°42′55″E		1022542	Upload Photo	Q26272469
Dairy Cottage	II	Home Farm Lane, Bury St Edmunds			12 July 1972	TL8565162406; 52°13′43″N 0°43′01″E		1022543	Upload Photo	Q26272471
Home Farmhouse	II	Home Farm Lane, Bury St Edmunds			25 August 1983	TL8554762126; 52°13′34″N 0°42′55″E		1205225	Upload Photo	Q26500588
West Hill House	II	87, Horringer Road, Bury St Edmunds			12 July 1972	TL8427863129; 52°14′08″N 0°41′50″E		1022552	Upload Photo	Q26273477
Outbuildings to the South West of West Mill	II	Horringer Road, Bury St Edmunds			12 July 1972	TL8418163050; 52°14′05″N 0°41′45″E		1022555	Upload Photo	Q26273480
West Mill	II	Horringer Road, Bury St Edmunds			12 July 1972	TL8414063099; 52°14′07″N 0°41′43″E		1022554	Upload Photo	Q26273479
The Elephant and Castle Public House	II	2, Hospital Road, Bury St Edmunds	pub		12 July 1972	TL8521463776; 52°14′28″N 0°42′41″E		1022556	The Elephant and Castle Public House More images	Q26273481
4, Hospital Road	II	4, Hospital Road, Bury St Edmunds			12 July 1972	TL8520563777; 52°14′28″N 0°42′40″E		1022557	Upload Photo	Q26273482
6, Hospital Road	II	6, Hospital Road, Bury St Edmunds			12 July 1972	TL8519663776; 52°14′28″N 0°42′40″E		1022558	Upload Photo	Q26273483
Numbers 14 and 16 and Attached Wall	II	14 and 16, Hospital Road, Bury St Edmunds			12 July 1972	TL8497663783; 52°14′28″N 0°42′28″E		1022559	Upload Photo	Q26273484
Numbers 18-24 and Attached Wall	II	18-24, Hospital Road, Bury St Edmunds			12 July 1972	TL8494463778; 52°14′28″N 0°42′26″E		1022560	Upload Photo	Q26273485
Numbers 26-32 and Attached Wall	II	26-32, Hospital Road, Bury St Edmunds			12 July 1972	TL8493063777; 52°14′28″N 0°42′26″E		1022561	Upload Photo	Q26273486
Beech Hill House and Attached Flanking Walls and Steps	II	Hospital Road, Bury St Edmunds			12 July 1972	TL8451763774; 52°14′28″N 0°42′04″E		1022562	Upload Photo	Q26273487
Church of St Peter	II	Hospital Road, Bury St Edmunds	church building		9 June 1986	TL8511263788; 52°14′28″N 0°42′35″E		1022563	Church of St Peter More images	Q26273488
1, Kings Road	II	1, Kings Road, Bury St Edmunds			30 October 1997	TL8511364173; 52°14′41″N 0°42′36″E		1022565	Upload Photo	Q26273490
2, Kings Road	II	2, Kings Road, Bury St Edmunds			30 October 1997	TL8510664171; 52°14′41″N 0°42′36″E		1022567	Upload Photo	Q26273494
Numbers 28-33 and Attached Walls	II	28-33, Kings Road, Bury St Edmunds			30 October 1997	TL8489764143; 52°14′40″N 0°42′25″E		1022571	Upload Photo	Q26273498
Numbers 37, 38 and 39 and Attached Walls	II	38 and 39 And Attached Walls, 37, 38 and 39, Kings Road, Bury St Edmunds			30 October 1997	TL8485664136; 52°14′40″N 0°42′22″E		1022574	Upload Photo	Q26273501
Cemetery Lodge	II	91, Kings Road, Bury St Edmunds			30 October 1997	TL8455664095; 52°14′39″N 0°42′07″E		1022577	Upload Photo	Q26273504
Linden House	II	147, Kings Road, Bury St Edmunds	house		12 July 1972	TL8500164185; 52°14′41″N 0°42′30″E		1022580	Linden House More images	Q26273507
Cemetery Chapel	II	Kings Road, Bury St Edmunds	chapel		30 October 1997	TL8444364053; 52°14′37″N 0°42′01″E		1022583	Cemetery Chapel More images	Q26273511
Kings Road Cemetery Francis Eagle Monument	II	Kings Road, Bury St Edmunds	monument		30 October 1997	TL8449764018; 52°14′36″N 0°42′03″E		1022586	Kings Road Cemetery Francis Eagle Monument More images	Q26273514
16, Long Brackland	II	16, Long Brackland, Bury St Edmunds			12 July 1972	TL8538664905; 52°15′04″N 0°42′52″E		1022588	Upload Photo	Q26273516
17, 17a, 18, 18a and 19, Long Brackland	II	17, 17a, 18, 18a and 19, Long Brackland, Bury St Edmunds			12 July 1972	TL8540264920; 52°15′04″N 0°42′53″E		1022589	Upload Photo	Q26273517
Number 4 and Attached Walls	II	4, Looms Lane, Bury St Edmunds			30 October 1997	TL8553064398; 52°14′47″N 0°42′58″E		1022590	Upload Photo	Q26273518
Garden Wall to Regency House Hotel	II	Looms Lane, Bury St Edmunds			12 July 1972	TL8547964386; 52°14′47″N 0°42′56″E		1022592	Upload Photo	Q26273520
Regency House Hotel	II	Looms Lane, Bury St Edmunds	hotel		12 July 1972	TL8546864411; 52°14′48″N 0°42′55″E		1022591	Regency House Hotel More images	Q26273519
Mildenhall Maltings	II	Mildenhall Road, Bury St Edmunds			12 July 1972	TL8490166324; 52°15′50″N 0°42′29″E		1022594	Upload Photo	Q26273523
The Priory Hotel	II*	Mildenhall Road, Bury St Edmunds			7 August 1952	TL8505665991; 52°15′39″N 0°42′37″E		1022595	Upload Photo	Q17540333
Walls to the Priory Hotel	II*	Mildenhall Road, Bury St Edmunds			7 August 1952	TL8508865952; 52°15′38″N 0°42′38″E		1022596	Upload Photo	Q17540345
The Linden Tree Public House	II	7, Out Northgate, Bury St Edmunds	pub		12 July 1972	TL8538565127; 52°15′11″N 0°42′52″E		1270971	The Linden Tree Public House More images	Q26560969
Northgate Railway Station	II	Out Northgate, Bury St Edmunds	railway station		12 July 1972	TL8526765167; 52°15′13″N 0°42′46″E		1270974	Northgate Railway Station More images	Q3243921
Railway Bridge	II	Out Northgate, Bury St Edmunds			11 February 1987	TL8537965179; 52°15′13″N 0°42′52″E		1244800	Upload Photo	Q26537380
Base of Medieval Cross	II	Out Risbygate, Bury St Edmunds			12 July 1972	TL8442064510; 52°14′52″N 0°42′00″E		1244801	Upload Photo	Q26537381
Gibraltar Barracks Walls and Gates	II	Out Risbygate, Bury St Edmunds			14 September 1992	TL8427664520; 52°14′53″N 0°41′53″E		1244844	Upload Photo	Q26537424
Gibraltar Barracks the Keep	II	Out Risbygate, Bury St Edmunds			14 September 1992	TL8429664526; 52°14′53″N 0°41′54″E		1244805	Upload Photo	Q26537385
13, Out Westgate	II	13, Out Westgate, Bury St Edmunds			12 July 1972	TL8520963739; 52°14′26″N 0°42′40″E		1244848	Upload Photo	Q26537428
15, Out Westgate	II	15, Out Westgate, Bury St Edmunds			12 July 1972	TL8520163733; 52°14′26″N 0°42′40″E		1244851	Upload Photo	Q26537431
17, Out Westgate	II	17, Out Westgate, Bury St Edmunds			12 July 1972	TL8518663722; 52°14′26″N 0°42′39″E		1244853	Upload Photo	Q26537433
19 and 21, Out Westgate	II	19 and 21, Out Westgate, Bury St Edmunds			12 July 1972	TL8518063720; 52°14′26″N 0°42′39″E		1244869	Upload Photo	Q26537449
Albert Buildings	II	23-29, Out Westgate, Bury St Edmunds			12 July 1972	TL8517363717; 52°14′26″N 0°42′38″E		1244873	Upload Photo	Q26537453
30, Out Westgate	II	30, Out Westgate, Bury St Edmunds			12 July 1972	TL8513863737; 52°14′26″N 0°42′36″E		1244874	Upload Photo	Q26537454
34-52, Out Westgate	II	34-52, Out Westgate, Bury St Edmunds			15 January 1986	TL8510763712; 52°14′26″N 0°42′35″E		1244877	Upload Photo	Q26537457
Wall on North Side of Lane	II	Pump Lane, Bury St Edmunds			30 October 1997	TL8545664473; 52°14′50″N 0°42′55″E		1244881	Wall on North Side of Lane More images	Q26537461
Walls on South Side of Lane	II	Pump Lane, Bury St Edmunds			30 October 1997	TL8546864470; 52°14′50″N 0°42′55″E		1244885	Upload Photo	Q26537465
1, Risbygate Street	II	1, Risbygate Street, 65, St Andrews Street South, Bury St Edmunds			12 July 1972	TL8517064419; 52°14′48″N 0°42′40″E		1244890	1, Risbygate Street More images	Q26537470
2, Risbygate Street	II	2, Risbygate Street, Bury St Edmunds			12 July 1972	TL8516464421; 52°14′49″N 0°42′39″E		1244895	2, Risbygate Street More images	Q26537475
The Market Tavern Public House	II	3, Risbygate Street, Bury St Edmunds	pub		12 July 1972	TL8515564423; 52°14′49″N 0°42′39″E		1244897	The Market Tavern Public House More images	Q26537477
9 and 10, Risbygate Street	II	9 and 10, Risbygate Street, Bury St Edmunds			12 July 1972	TL8511664434; 52°14′49″N 0°42′37″E		1244898	9 and 10, Risbygate Street More images	Q26537478
16 and 17, Risbygate Street	II	16 and 17, Risbygate Street, Bury St Edmunds			12 July 1972	TL8505564455; 52°14′50″N 0°42′34″E		1244900	16 and 17, Risbygate Street More images	Q26537480
24, 25 and 26, Risbygate Street	II	24, 25 and 26, Risbygate Street, Bury St Edmunds			9 June 1995	TL8496164473; 52°14′50″N 0°42′29″E		1244906	24, 25 and 26, Risbygate Street More images	Q26537485
Demeter House	II	27, Risbygate Street, Bury St Edmunds			12 July 1972	TL8495764473; 52°14′50″N 0°42′28″E		1244909	Demeter House More images	Q26537488
Royston House (number 81) and No 82	II	81 and 82, Risbygate Street, Bury St Edmunds			12 July 1972	TL8493864503; 52°14′51″N 0°42′27″E		1244911	Royston House (number 81) and No 82 More images	Q26537490
83, Risbygate Street	II	83, Risbygate Street, Bury St Edmunds			7 August 1952	TL8495464501; 52°14′51″N 0°42′28″E		1244914	83, Risbygate Street More images	Q26537493
90, Risbygate Street	II	90, Risbygate Street, Bury St Edmunds			7 August 1952	TL8499264498; 52°14′51″N 0°42′30″E		1244916	90, Risbygate Street More images	Q26537495
93 and 95, Risbygate Street	II*	93 and 95, Risbygate Street, Bury St Edmunds			7 August 1952	TL8501564490; 52°14′51″N 0°42′31″E		1244918	93 and 95, Risbygate Street More images	Q17545560
96a and 96b and Attached Wall	II	96a and 96b And Attached Wall, 96a and 96b, Risbygate Street, Bury St Edmunds			9 June 1997	TL8503464499; 52°14′51″N 0°42′33″E		1244919	Upload Photo	Q26537497
The Rising Sun Public House	II*	98, Risbygate Street, Bury St Edmunds	pub		7 August 1952	TL8506264477; 52°14′50″N 0°42′34″E		1244921	The Rising Sun Public House More images	Q17545564
98a, 99 and 100, Risbygate Street	II	98a, 99 and 100, Risbygate Street, Bury St Edmunds			7 August 1952	TL8508064473; 52°14′50″N 0°42′35″E		1244993	98a, 99 and 100, Risbygate Street More images	Q26537569
Numbers 104-108 and Attached Railings	II	104-108, Risbygate Street, Bury St Edmunds			9 June 1995	TL8515164454; 52°14′50″N 0°42′39″E		1244994	Numbers 104-108 and Attached Railings More images	Q26537570
Granaries to North West of Number 98 the Rising Sun Public House	II	Risbygate Street, Bury St Edmunds			9 June 1995	TL8504764526; 52°14′52″N 0°42′33″E		1244988	Upload Photo	Q26537564
Fennell Memorial Homes	II	57, 58 and 59, St Andrews Street North, Bury St Edmunds			30 October 1997	TL8519564611; 52°14′55″N 0°42′41″E		1244995	Upload Photo	Q26537571
31 and 32, St Andrews Street South	II	31 and 32, St Andrews Street South, Bury St Edmunds			12 July 1972	TL8520063960; 52°14′34″N 0°42′40″E		1245000	Upload Photo	Q26537576
St Andrews Castle	II*	St Andrews Street South, Bury St Edmunds			12 July 1972	TL8513563966; 52°14′34″N 0°42′37″E		1245008	Upload Photo	Q17545568
The Gate House Wall and Gateway to St Andrews Castle	II	St Andrews Street South, Bury St Edmunds			12 July 1972	TL8519563989; 52°14′35″N 0°42′40″E		1245010	Upload Photo	Q26537584
Wall and Gateway to Rear of Number 70 (number 70 Not Included)	II	St Andrews Street South, Bury St Edmunds			12 July 1972	TL8523363922; 52°14′32″N 0°42′42″E		1245004	Upload Photo	Q26537579
4, St Johns Street	II	4, St Johns Street, Bury St Edmunds			12 July 1972	TL8522364481; 52°14′50″N 0°42′42″E		1245016	4, St Johns Street More images	Q26537590
5, St Johns Street	II	5, St Johns Street, Bury St Edmunds			12 July 1972	TL8522164485; 52°14′51″N 0°42′42″E		1245018	Upload Photo	Q26537592
6, St Johns Street	II	6, St Johns Street, Bury St Edmunds			12 July 1972	TL8522064494; 52°14′51″N 0°42′42″E		1245020	6, St Johns Street More images	Q26537594
7, 8 and 9, St Johns Street	II	7, 8 and 9, St Johns Street, Bury St Edmunds			12 July 1972	TL8522164504; 52°14′51″N 0°42′42″E		1244960	7, 8 and 9, St Johns Street More images	Q26537535
10, 11 and 12, St Johns Street	II	10, 11 and 12, St Johns Street, Bury St Edmunds			12 July 1972	TL8521464513; 52°14′51″N 0°42′42″E		1244961	10, 11 and 12, St Johns Street More images	Q26537536
13, St Johns Street	II	13, St Johns Street, Bury St Edmunds			12 July 1972	TL8521664525; 52°14′52″N 0°42′42″E		1244962	13, St Johns Street More images	Q26537537
16 and 18, St Johns Street	II	16 and 18, St Johns Street, Bury St Edmunds			12 July 1972	TL8522164546; 52°14′52″N 0°42′42″E		1244963	16 and 18, St Johns Street More images	Q26537538
The Bushel Public House	II	28 and 29, St Johns Street, Bury St Edmunds	pub		12 July 1972	TL8523164645; 52°14′56″N 0°42′43″E		1244964	The Bushel Public House More images	Q26537539
33, St Johns Street	II	33, St Johns Street, Bury St Edmunds			12 July 1972	TL8523664677; 52°14′57″N 0°42′44″E		1244965	33, St Johns Street More images	Q26537540
36, St Johns Street	II	36, St Johns Street, Bury St Edmunds			12 July 1972	TL8524164702; 52°14′58″N 0°42′44″E		1244966	36, St Johns Street More images	Q26537541
51 and 52, St Johns Street	II	51 and 52, St Johns Street, Bury St Edmunds			2 November 1993	TL8528664736; 52°14′59″N 0°42′46″E		1313422	51 and 52, St Johns Street More images	Q26599861
53, St John's Street	II	53, St John's Street, Bury St Edmunds			12 July 1972	TL8527764725; 52°14′58″N 0°42′46″E		1313423	53, St John's Street More images	Q26599862
54, St Johns Street	II	54, St Johns Street, Bury St Edmunds			12 July 1972	TL8527464710; 52°14′58″N 0°42′46″E		1313424	54, St Johns Street More images	Q26599864
Garden Wall to Number 54	II	54, St Johns Street, Bury St Edmunds			12 July 1972	TL8526364701; 52°14′57″N 0°42′45″E		1313426	Upload Photo	Q26599866
63 and 65, St Johns Street	II	63 and 65, St Johns Street, Bury St Edmunds			30 October 1997	TL8524564584; 52°14′54″N 0°42′44″E		1313427	63 and 65, St Johns Street More images	Q26599867
67, St Johns Street	II	67, St Johns Street, Bury St Edmunds			12 July 1972	TL8524264569; 52°14′53″N 0°42′44″E		1313428	67, St Johns Street More images	Q26599868
68 and 69, St Johns Street	II	68 and 69, St Johns Street, Bury St Edmunds			12 July 1972	TL8524864561; 52°14′53″N 0°42′44″E		1313429	68 and 69, St Johns Street More images	Q26599869
78, St Johns Street	II	78, St Johns Street, Bury St Edmunds			30 October 1997	TL8525464499; 52°14′51″N 0°42′44″E		1135141	Upload Photo	Q26428532
86, St Johns Street	II	86, St Johns Street, Bury St Edmunds			12 July 1972	TL8524864466; 52°14′50″N 0°42′44″E		1135143	86, St Johns Street More images	Q26428534
90, St Johns Street	II	90, St Johns Street, Bury St Edmunds			12 July 1972	TL8526964451; 52°14′49″N 0°42′45″E		1135144	Upload Photo	Q26428535
91 and 92, St Johns Street	II	91 and 92, St Johns Street, Bury St Edmunds			12 July 1972	TL8525264432; 52°14′49″N 0°42′44″E		1135147	91 and 92, St Johns Street More images	Q26428538
Church of St John	II*	St Johns Street, Bury St Edmunds	church building		7 August 1952	TL8528164677; 52°14′57″N 0°42′46″E		1135148	Church of St John More images	Q17545326
St Johns Hall	II	St Johns Street, Bury St Edmunds			30 October 1997	TL8526164652; 52°14′56″N 0°42′45″E		1135152	Upload Photo	Q26428542
Bury St Edmunds Quaker Meeting House	II	IP33 1SJ, St Johns Street, Bury St Edmunds	Quaker meeting house		12 July 1972	TL8520864605; 52°14′54″N 0°42′42″E		1135150	Bury St Edmunds Quaker Meeting House More images	Q26428540
Hardwick Manor with Walled Garden and Gates	II	IP33 2RD, Sharp Road, Bury St Edmunds			7 February 2022	TL8485162351; 52°13′42″N 0°42′19″E		1479384	Upload Photo	Q111851399
1, The Traverse	II	1, The Traverse, Bury St Edmunds			12 July 1972	TL8527164317; 52°14′45″N 0°42′45″E		1145963	1, The Traverse More images	Q26439129
3a and 3b, the Traverse	II	3a and 3b, The Traverse, Bury St Edmunds			12 July 1972	TL8527664309; 52°14′45″N 0°42′45″E		1145956	3a and 3b, the Traverse More images	Q26439119
4 and 4a, The Traverse	II	4 and 4a, The Traverse, Bury St Edmunds			7 August 1952	TL8527864300; 52°14′44″N 0°42′45″E		1145957	4 and 4a, The Traverse More images	Q26439120
6, The Traverse	II	6, The Traverse, Bury St Edmunds			7 December 1972	TL8528264276; 52°14′44″N 0°42′45″E		1038262	6, The Traverse More images	Q26289980
Cupola House	II	7 The Traverse, Bury St Edmunds	building		7 August 1952	TL8528264268; 52°14′43″N 0°42′45″E		1038264	Cupola House More images	Q17526582
8 and 8a, The Traverse	II	8 and 8a, The Traverse, Bury St Edmunds			12 July 1972	TL8528464258; 52°14′43″N 0°42′45″E		1038272	8 and 8a, The Traverse More images	Q26289989
9, 9a and 9b, the Traverse	II	9, 9a and 9b, The Traverse, Bury St Edmunds			12 July 1972	TL8528664248; 52°14′43″N 0°42′45″E		1038273	9, 9a and 9b, the Traverse More images	Q26289990
10, 11 and 12, The Traverse	II	10, 11 and 12, The Traverse, Bury St Edmunds			7 August 1952	TL8529264245; 52°14′43″N 0°42′46″E		1038274	10, 11 and 12, The Traverse More images	Q26289991
13 and 14, the Traverse	II	13 and 14, The Traverse, Bury St Edmunds			7 August 1952	TL8529064227; 52°14′42″N 0°42′45″E		1038275	13 and 14, the Traverse More images	Q26289992
15 and 16, the Traverse	II	15 and 16, The Traverse, Bury St Edmunds			12 July 1972	TL8529764217; 52°14′42″N 0°42′46″E		1038276	15 and 16, the Traverse More images	Q26289993
The Nutshell Public House	II	17, The Traverse, Bury St Edmunds	pub		12 July 1972	TL8529664202; 52°14′41″N 0°42′46″E		1038277	The Nutshell Public House More images	Q2222663
Ouida Memorial	II	Vinery Road, Bury St Edmunds	memorial		30 October 1997	TL8476363509; 52°14′20″N 0°42′16″E		1365860	Ouida Memorial More images	Q26647509
10 and 11, Well Street	II	10 and 11, Well Street, Bury St Edmunds			12 July 1972	TL8533464470; 52°14′50″N 0°42′48″E		1365867	Upload Photo	Q26647516
12 and 13, Well Street	II	12 and 13, Well Street, Bury St Edmunds			12 July 1972	TL8533164478; 52°14′50″N 0°42′48″E		1365869	Upload Photo	Q26647518
14, Well Street	II	14, Well Street, Bury St Edmunds			12 July 1972	TL8532664494; 52°14′51″N 0°42′48″E		1365871	Upload Photo	Q26647520
15, Well Street	II	15, Well Street, Bury St Edmunds			12 July 1972	TL8532564505; 52°14′51″N 0°42′48″E		1365873	Upload Photo	Q26647522
Number 20 and Attached Railings and Gate	II	20, Well Street, Bury St Edmunds			12 July 1972	TL8533064538; 52°14′52″N 0°42′48″E		1365875	Upload Photo	Q26647524
21 and 22, Well Street	II	21 and 22, Well Street, Bury St Edmunds			12 July 1972	TL8533564532; 52°14′52″N 0°42′48″E		1365877	Upload Photo	Q26647526
23, Well Street	II	23, Well Street, Bury St Edmunds			12 July 1972	TL8533864523; 52°14′52″N 0°42′49″E		1365878	Upload Photo	Q26647527
24-27, Well Street	II	24-27, Well Street, Bury St Edmunds			12 July 1972	TL8534564513; 52°14′51″N 0°42′49″E		1365880	Upload Photo	Q26647528
28, 29 and 30, Well Street	II	28, 29 and 30, Well Street, Bury St Edmunds			12 July 1972	TL8535464492; 52°14′51″N 0°42′49″E		1365881	Upload Photo	Q26647529
31-34, Well Street	II	31-34, Well Street, Bury St Edmunds			12 July 1972	TL8536064477; 52°14′50″N 0°42′50″E		1328300	Upload Photo	Q26613652
St Johns Vicarage (number 36)	II	35, 36 and 37, Well Street, Bury St Edmunds			12 July 1972	TL8536764446; 52°14′49″N 0°42′50″E		1328304	Upload Photo	Q26613657
38 and 39, Well Street	II	38 and 39, Well Street, Bury St Edmunds			12 July 1972	TL8537064430; 52°14′49″N 0°42′50″E		1328308	38 and 39, Well Street More images	Q26613661
40, Well Street	II	40, Well Street, Bury St Edmunds			12 July 1972	TL8537164418; 52°14′48″N 0°42′50″E		1328310	40, Well Street More images	Q26613663
41, Well Street	II	41, Well Street, Bury St Edmunds			12 July 1972	TL8536964409; 52°14′48″N 0°42′50″E		1328314	41, Well Street More images	Q26613667
42 and 43, Well Street	II	42 and 43, Well Street, Bury St Edmunds			12 July 1972	TL8536864402; 52°14′48″N 0°42′50″E		1328316	42 and 43, Well Street More images	Q26613669
44 and 45, Well Street	II	44 and 45, Well Street, Bury St Edmunds			12 July 1972	TL8537064396; 52°14′47″N 0°42′50″E		1328319	44 and 45, Well Street More images	Q26613672
8, Westgate Street	II	8, Westgate Street, Bury St Edmunds			7 August 1952	TL8553163773; 52°14′27″N 0°42′57″E		1141937	8, Westgate Street More images	Q26434732
12, Westgate Street	II	12, Westgate Street, Bury St Edmunds			12 July 1972	TL8549463771; 52°14′27″N 0°42′55″E		1142299	12, Westgate Street More images	Q26435105
14 and 15, Westgate Street	II	14 and 15, Westgate Street, Bury St Edmunds			12 July 1972	TL8543063772; 52°14′27″N 0°42′52″E		1142301	14 and 15, Westgate Street More images	Q26435106
Number 16 and Attached Wall	II	16, Westgate Street, Bury St Edmunds			7 August 1952	TL8541863772; 52°14′27″N 0°42′51″E		1142302	Number 16 and Attached Wall More images	Q26435107
17, Westgate Street	II	17, Westgate Street, Bury St Edmunds			7 August 1952	TL8538663764; 52°14′27″N 0°42′50″E		1142304	17, Westgate Street More images	Q26435110
18, Westgate Street	II	18, Westgate Street, Bury St Edmunds			12 July 1972	TL8537163764; 52°14′27″N 0°42′49″E		1142305	18, Westgate Street More images	Q26435112
Presbytery to the Roman Catholic Church of St Edmund King and Martyr (excluding the Blessed Sacrament Chapel at the Rear)	II	21 Westgate Street, Bury St Edmunds, IP33 1QG			7 August 1952	TL8532363756; 52°14′27″N 0°42′46″E		1142308	Presbytery to the Roman Catholic Church of St Edmund King and Martyr (excluding the Blessed Sacrament Chapel at the Rear) More images	Q26435117
23, Westgate Street	II	23, Westgate Street, Bury St Edmunds			12 July 1972	TL8531263762; 52°14′27″N 0°42′46″E		1142311	23, Westgate Street More images	Q26435120
Turret House	II*	24, Westgate Street, Bury St Edmunds	house		7 August 1952	TL8529763760; 52°14′27″N 0°42′45″E		1142315	Turret House More images	Q17545376
25, Westgate Street	II	25, Westgate Street, Bury St Edmunds			12 July 1972	TL8528663759; 52°14′27″N 0°42′44″E		1142318	25, Westgate Street More images	Q26435127
37 and 38, Westgate Street	II	37 and 38, Westgate Street, Bury St Edmunds			12 July 1972	TL8528063781; 52°14′28″N 0°42′44″E		1142319	37 and 38, Westgate Street More images	Q26435128
42-48, Westgate Street	II	42-48, Westgate Street, Bury St Edmunds			12 March 1996	TL8534363785; 52°14′28″N 0°42′47″E		1142320	42-48, Westgate Street More images	Q26435129
53 and 54, Westgate Street	II	53 and 54, Westgate Street, Bury St Edmunds			12 July 1972	TL8538263790; 52°14′28″N 0°42′49″E		1142324	53 and 54, Westgate Street More images	Q26435134
Batt House	II	56, Westgate Street, Bury St Edmunds			12 July 1972	TL8539163789; 52°14′28″N 0°42′50″E		1142325	Batt House More images	Q26435135
Highbury House	II	57, Westgate Street, Bury St Edmunds	house		7 August 1952	TL8543263807; 52°14′28″N 0°42′52″E		1142327	Highbury House More images	Q26435137
K6 Telephone Kiosk	II	Westgate Street, Bury St Edmunds			12 March 1996	TL8530063789; 52°14′28″N 0°42′45″E		1142284	K6 Telephone Kiosk More images	Q26435091
Railings on East Side of Church of St Edmund	II	Westgate Street, Bury St Edmunds			12 July 1972	TL8535063765; 52°14′27″N 0°42′48″E		1142275	Upload Photo	Q26435082
Roman Catholic Church of St Edmund King and Martyr, Including the Former Private Chapel to the Rear of the Adjoining Presbytery (now the Blessed Sacrament Chapel)	II*	Westgate Street, IP33 1QG, Bury St Edmunds	church building		7 August 1952	TL8534063745; 52°14′26″N 0°42′47″E		1142338	Roman Catholic Church of St Edmund King and Martyr, Including the Former Private Chapel to the Rear of the Adjoining Presbytery (now the Blessed Sacrament Chapel) More images	Q15979340
52, Westley Road	II	52, Westley Road, Bury St Edmunds			5 August 1981	TL8399364318; 52°14′47″N 0°41′37″E		1142286	Upload Photo	Q26435092
56, Abbeygate Street	II*	1 and 2a, Whiting Street, Bury St Edmunds			7 August 1952	TL8531664173; 52°14′40″N 0°42′47″E		1141143	56, Abbeygate Street More images	Q17545350
4 and 5, Whiting Street	II	4 and 5, Whiting Street, Bury St Edmunds			7 August 1952	TL8532564144; 52°14′39″N 0°42′47″E		1142293	4 and 5, Whiting Street More images	Q26435100
6, Whiting Street	II	6, Whiting Street, Bury St Edmunds			12 July 1972	TL8532464135; 52°14′39″N 0°42′47″E		1334455	Upload Photo	Q26619122
7, Whiting Street	II	7, Whiting Street, Bury St Edmunds			12 July 1972	TL8533764125; 52°14′39″N 0°42′48″E		1334457	Upload Photo	Q26619124
8, Whiting Street	II	8, Whiting Street, Bury St Edmunds			12 July 1972	TL8532664107; 52°14′38″N 0°42′47″E		1334461	8, Whiting Street More images	Q26619128
9, Whiting Street	II	9, Whiting Street, Bury St Edmunds			12 July 1972	TL8532664100; 52°14′38″N 0°42′47″E		1334466	9, Whiting Street More images	Q26619133
10 and 10b, Whiting Street	II	10 and 10b, Whiting Street, Bury St Edmunds			7 August 1952	TL8532664091; 52°14′38″N 0°42′47″E		1334468	10 and 10b, Whiting Street More images	Q26619135
11 and 12, Whiting Street	II	11 and 12, Whiting Street, Bury St Edmunds			12 July 1972	TL8532864079; 52°14′37″N 0°42′47″E		1334432	11 and 12, Whiting Street More images	Q26619099
13, Whiting Street	II	13, Whiting Street, Bury St Edmunds			12 July 1972	TL8532664070; 52°14′37″N 0°42′47″E		1334435	13, Whiting Street More images	Q26619102
The Masons Arms Public House	II	14, Whiting Street, Bury St Edmunds	pub		12 July 1972	TL8532764060; 52°14′37″N 0°42′47″E		1334446	The Masons Arms Public House More images	Q26619113
15, Whiting Street	II	15, Whiting Street, Bury St Edmunds			12 July 1972	TL8533364050; 52°14′36″N 0°42′47″E		1334447	Upload Photo	Q26619114
16, Whiting Street	II	16, Whiting Street, Bury St Edmunds			12 July 1972	TL8533064041; 52°14′36″N 0°42′47″E		1334450	Upload Photo	Q26619117
18, Whiting Street	II	18, Whiting Street, Bury St Edmunds			7 August 1952	TL8534063998; 52°14′35″N 0°42′48″E		1334452	18, Whiting Street	Q26619119
19, Whiting Street	II	19, Whiting Street, Bury St Edmunds			7 August 1952	TL8534763994; 52°14′34″N 0°42′48″E		1096757	19, Whiting Street More images	Q26389027
21-30, Whiting Street	II	21-30, Whiting Street, Bury St Edmunds			30 October 1997	TL8535563889; 52°14′31″N 0°42′48″E		1096760	21-30, Whiting Street More images	Q26389031
32, Whiting Street	II	32, Whiting Street, Bury St Edmunds			12 July 1972	TL8535763874; 52°14′31″N 0°42′48″E		1096761	32, Whiting Street More images	Q26389032
33 and 34, Whiting Street	II	33 and 34, Whiting Street, Bury St Edmunds			12 July 1972	TL8535963867; 52°14′30″N 0°42′48″E		1096764	33 and 34, Whiting Street More images	Q26389034
36, Whiting Street	II	36, Whiting Street, Bury St Edmunds			12 July 1972	TL8536063850; 52°14′30″N 0°42′48″E		1096765	36, Whiting Street More images	Q26389035
38, Whiting Street	II	38, Whiting Street, Bury St Edmunds			12 July 1972	TL8536363846; 52°14′30″N 0°42′49″E		1096766	38, Whiting Street More images	Q26389036
40, Whiting Street	II	40, Whiting Street, Bury St Edmunds			7 August 1952	TL8536463833; 52°14′29″N 0°42′49″E		1096767	40, Whiting Street More images	Q26389037
41 and 43, Whiting Street	II	41 and 43, Whiting Street, Bury St Edmunds			12 July 1972	TL8536363827; 52°14′29″N 0°42′49″E		1096768	41 and 43, Whiting Street More images	Q26389038
Rose and Crown Public House	II	48, Whiting Street, Bury St Edmunds	pub		12 July 1972	TL8536763791; 52°14′28″N 0°42′49″E		1096769	Rose and Crown Public House More images	Q26389039
49, Whiting Street	II	49, Whiting Street, Bury St Edmunds			12 July 1972	TL8535363788; 52°14′28″N 0°42′48″E		1096770	49, Whiting Street More images	Q26389040
50 and 51, Whiting Street	II	50 and 51, Whiting Street, Bury St Edmunds			12 July 1972	TL8535063794; 52°14′28″N 0°42′48″E		1096771	50 and 51, Whiting Street More images	Q26389041
54 and 55, Whiting Street	II	54 and 55, Whiting Street, Bury St Edmunds			12 July 1972	TL8534663807; 52°14′28″N 0°42′48″E		1096772	54 and 55, Whiting Street More images	Q26389042
St Marys House	II	56, Whiting Street, Bury St Edmunds			7 August 1952	TL8534463818; 52°14′29″N 0°42′47″E		1096773	St Marys House More images	Q26389043
57, Whiting Street	II	57, Whiting Street, Bury St Edmunds			12 July 1972	TL8534063847; 52°14′30″N 0°42′47″E		1096774	57, Whiting Street More images	Q26389044
58, Whiting Street	II	58, Whiting Street, Bury St Edmunds			7 August 1952	TL8533863854; 52°14′30″N 0°42′47″E		1096775	58, Whiting Street More images	Q26389045
59, Whiting Street	II	59, Whiting Street, Bury St Edmunds			7 August 1952	TL8533763859; 52°14′30″N 0°42′47″E		1096776	59, Whiting Street More images	Q26389046
Greyfriars	II	60, Whiting Street, Bury St Edmunds			7 August 1952	TL8533363886; 52°14′31″N 0°42′47″E		1096777	Greyfriars More images	Q26389047
Number 61 and Attached Railings	II	61, Whiting Street, Bury St Edmunds			7 August 1952	TL8533363904; 52°14′32″N 0°42′47″E		1096734	Number 61 and Attached Railings More images	Q26389004
Numbers 62 and 63 and Attached Railings	II	62 and 63, Whiting Street, Bury St Edmunds			7 August 1952	TL8533163908; 52°14′32″N 0°42′47″E		1096741	Numbers 62 and 63 and Attached Railings More images	Q26389011
65 and 66, Whiting Street	II	65 and 66, Whiting Street, Bury St Edmunds			12 July 1972	TL8532263971; 52°14′34″N 0°42′47″E		1096749	65 and 66, Whiting Street More images	Q26389019
67, Whiting Street	II	67, Whiting Street, Bury St Edmunds			7 August 1952	TL8532063982; 52°14′34″N 0°42′47″E		1096709	67, Whiting Street More images	Q26388978
68, Whiting Street	II	68, Whiting Street, Bury St Edmunds			7 August 1952	TL8531863988; 52°14′34″N 0°42′46″E		1096713	68, Whiting Street More images	Q26388982
Masongill House	II	69, Whiting Street, Bury St Edmunds			12 July 1972	TL8531863996; 52°14′35″N 0°42′46″E		1096717	Masongill House More images	Q26388987
74, Whiting Street	II	74, Whiting Street, Bury St Edmunds			12 July 1972	TL8531164044; 52°14′36″N 0°42′46″E		1096722	74, Whiting Street More images	Q26388992
76, 77 and 78, Whiting Street	II	76, 77 and 78, Whiting Street, Bury St Edmunds			12 July 1972	TL8531064050; 52°14′36″N 0°42′46″E		1096728	76, 77 and 78, Whiting Street More images	Q26388998
79, Whiting Street	II	79, Whiting Street, Bury St Edmunds			12 July 1972	TL8530764069; 52°14′37″N 0°42′46″E		1096730	79, Whiting Street More images	Q26389000
80, Whiting Street	II	80, Whiting Street, Bury St Edmunds			12 July 1972	TL8530464085; 52°14′37″N 0°42′46″E		1271634	80, Whiting Street More images	Q26561567
83, Whiting Street	II	83, Whiting Street, Bury St Edmunds			7 August 1952	TL8529864104; 52°14′38″N 0°42′46″E		1271636	83, Whiting Street More images	Q26561569
84, Whiting Street	II	84, Whiting Street, Bury St Edmunds			7 August 1952	TL8530064112; 52°14′38″N 0°42′46″E		1271642	84, Whiting Street More images	Q26561574
85 and 85a, Whiting Street	II	85 and 85a, Whiting Street, Bury St Edmunds			7 August 1952	TL8528664121; 52°14′39″N 0°42′45″E		1271646	85 and 85a, Whiting Street More images	Q26561578
86, Whiting Street	II	86, Whiting Street, Bury St Edmunds			12 July 1972	TL8530164130; 52°14′39″N 0°42′46″E		1132595	86, Whiting Street More images	Q26425549
87, Whiting Street	II	87, Whiting Street, Bury St Edmunds			12 July 1972	TL8529964140; 52°14′39″N 0°42′46″E		1132604	87, Whiting Street More images	Q26425559
89, Whiting Street	II	89, Whiting Street, Bury St Edmunds			12 July 1972	TL8530164153; 52°14′40″N 0°42′46″E		1132609	89, Whiting Street More images	Q26425565
Boundary Walls to United Reformed Church	II	Whiting Street, Bury St Edmunds			12 July 1972	TL8533463926; 52°14′32″N 0°42′47″E		1132617	Upload Photo	Q26425573
United Reformed Church	II	Whiting Street, Bury St Edmunds			12 July 1972	TL8531163947; 52°14′33″N 0°42′46″E		1132612	United Reformed Church More images	Q26425568
Church Hall to United Reformed Church	II	Whiting Street, Bury St Edmunds			12 July 1972	TL8531463960; 52°14′33″N 0°42′46″E		1132618	Church Hall to United Reformed Church More images	Q26425574
Premises Occupied by Piano Workshop/salesroom Behind Number 65 and Attached Wall	II	Whiting Street, Bury St Edmunds			12 July 1972	TL8531063971; 52°14′34″N 0°42′46″E		1096753	Upload Photo	Q26389023

== See also ==
- Grade I listed buildings in Suffolk
- Grade II* listed buildings in Suffolk

== Sources ==
- Bettely, James; Pevsner, Nikolaus (2015) [1961], Suffolk: West, The Buildings of England, New Haven and London: Yale University Press, ISBN 978-0-300-19655-9
