= Christ Church, Southwark =

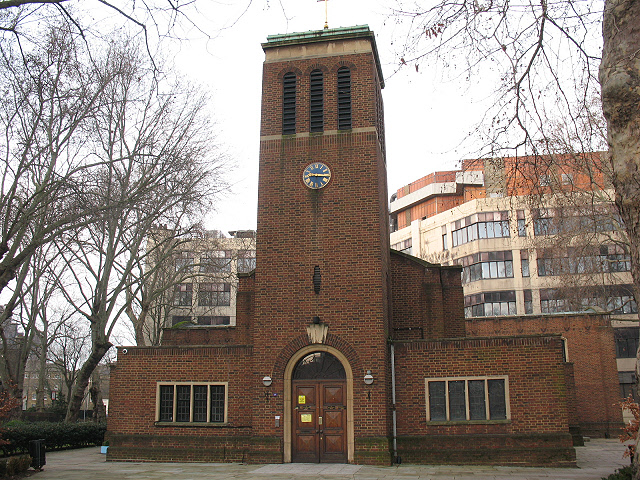
- The rebuilt Christ Church
- Christ Church, Southwark
- 51°30′23″N 0°06′18″W
- OS grid reference: TQ 31603 80291
- Address: Blackfriars Road, London
- Country: England
- Denomination: Church of England

History
- Status: Parish church

Architecture
- Functional status: Active
- Heritage designation: Grade II listed
- Designated: 26 October 2010
- Completed: 1958

Administration
- Diocese: Southwark
- Archdeaconry: Southwark
- Parish: Christ Church Southwark

Clergy
- Rector: The Revd Lee Chantler

Christ Church, Southwark, is a church of the Anglican denomination situated on the west side of Blackfriars Road, London. At the time of the foundation there was no bridge at Blackfriars and so no major road connecting the area to the south or to the City.

The current church was built in 1958, following total destruction of the previous building in 1941, during the London Blitz. It has been Grade II listed since 2010.

== History ==
The parish of Christ Church, Surrey was created in 1671 by the Christ Church and St. Saviour's Parishes Southwark Act 1670 (22 & 23 Cha. 2. c. 28 Pr.) in the manor of Paris Garden as a result of the gift under the direction of the executors of John Marshall, a member of a Southwark family of “whitebakers”. This was previously part of the St Saviour’s parish. His will, of 1627, provided from 1637 and directed that a new church should be built and a Rector be appointed and paid for in that Manor, the most westerly part of St Saviour's parish. He died in 1631. The first church was built in 1671.

This charity still provides for these purposes. The John Marshall Trustees are independent of the parochial charities and the wealth they have accumulated for its objects are distributed over most of the counties of Kent, Surrey (including those parts now in Greater London) and Lincolnshire. The beneficiaries are Rectors of parishes of the Church of England. The first charge on the charity is the maintenance of Christchurch which they have completely rebuilt in 1738. The first had been built on marshy ground, and by the 1720s was in a poor condition and collapsed. By the Christ Church Southwark Act 1737 (11 Geo. 2. c. 21), passed in May 1738, the trustees were empowered to demolish the church and rebuild it in an improved enclosure. By 1741 the new Christ Church had been completed in Italian Romanesque style with a clocktower rising in three stages from the ground, surmounted by an octagonal lantern and cupola.

The churchyard was closed to burials in 1856. In 1900 the Metropolitan Public Gardens Association laid out the churchyard as a public garden, and it was opened by the Bishop of Rochester that year (the parish then being in the Diocese of Rochester. Those works included a drinking fountain donated by the philanthropist John Passmore Edwards.

The church was destroyed by bombing in 1941. The burning cross from the church fell into the churchyard, scorching the ground. The position in which it landed is marked with a stone cross, and is near to the drinking fountain which remains in place and is Grade II listed. The garden was renovated in 2000 with support from the MPGA, amongst others.

Marshall is commemorated in the porch of the church by his coat of arms and also the attached church hall is also named after him. It is also the home of the South London Industrial Mission.

Its parish coincided with the manor of Paris Garden, mentioned by Shakespeare in his play Henry VIII as being, at that time, a disreputable place. Its jurisdiction was outside that of the Bishop of Winchester's 'Liberty of the Clink' to its east and the Archbishop of Canterbury's Manor of Lambeth to its west.

Today this is an office location north of Southwark Station on the London Underground Jubilee line, and forms part of the London Borough of Southwark.

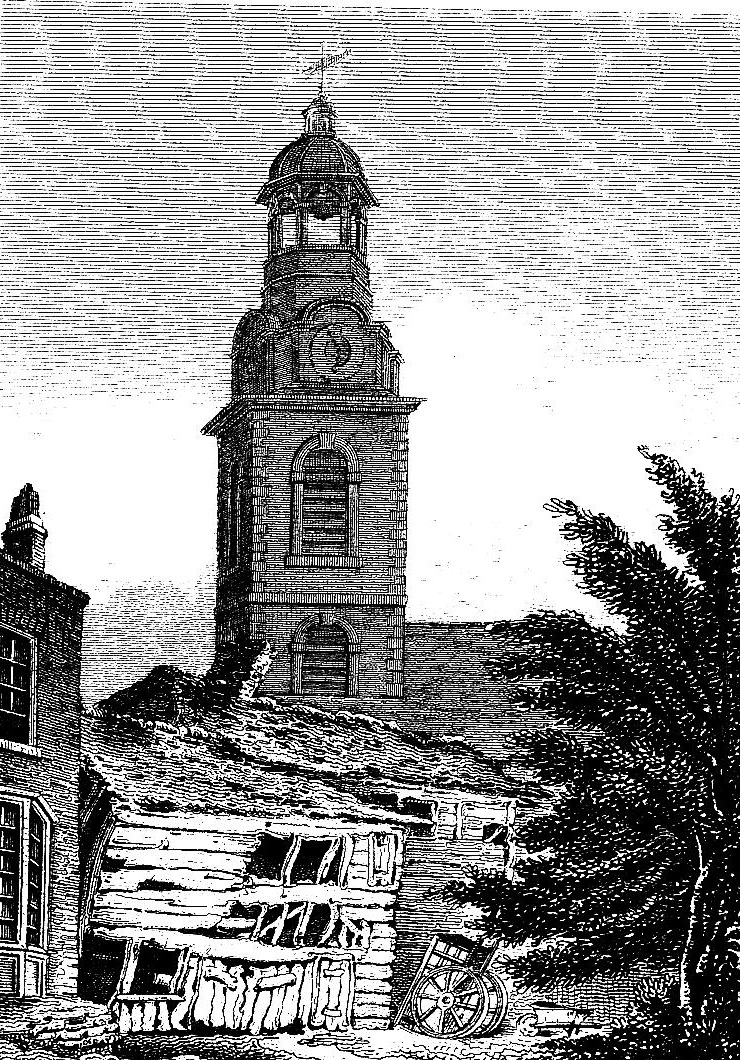
Christ Church, Southwark in 1817

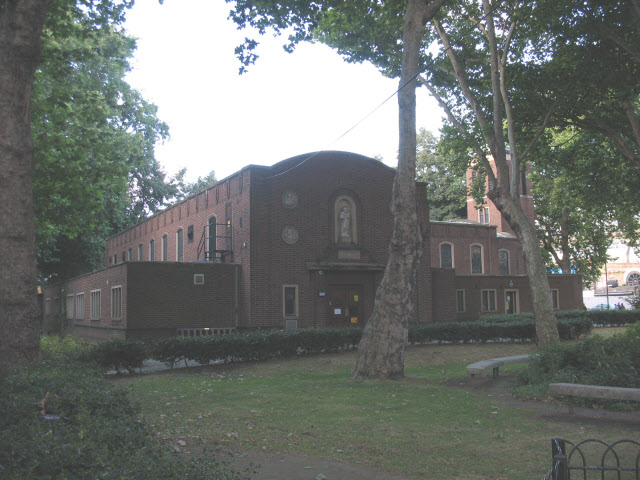
Side view of the church

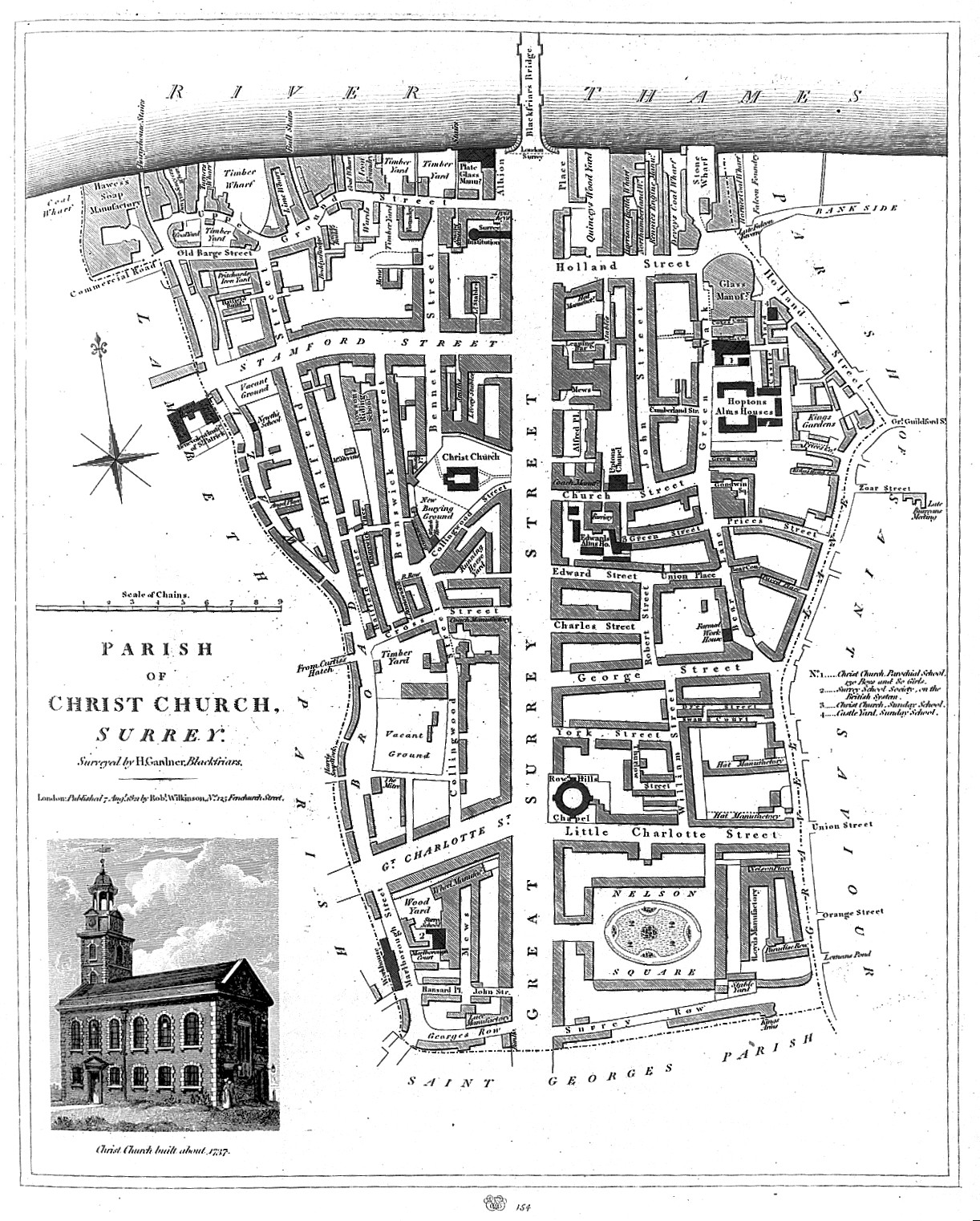
An 18th–century map of the parish

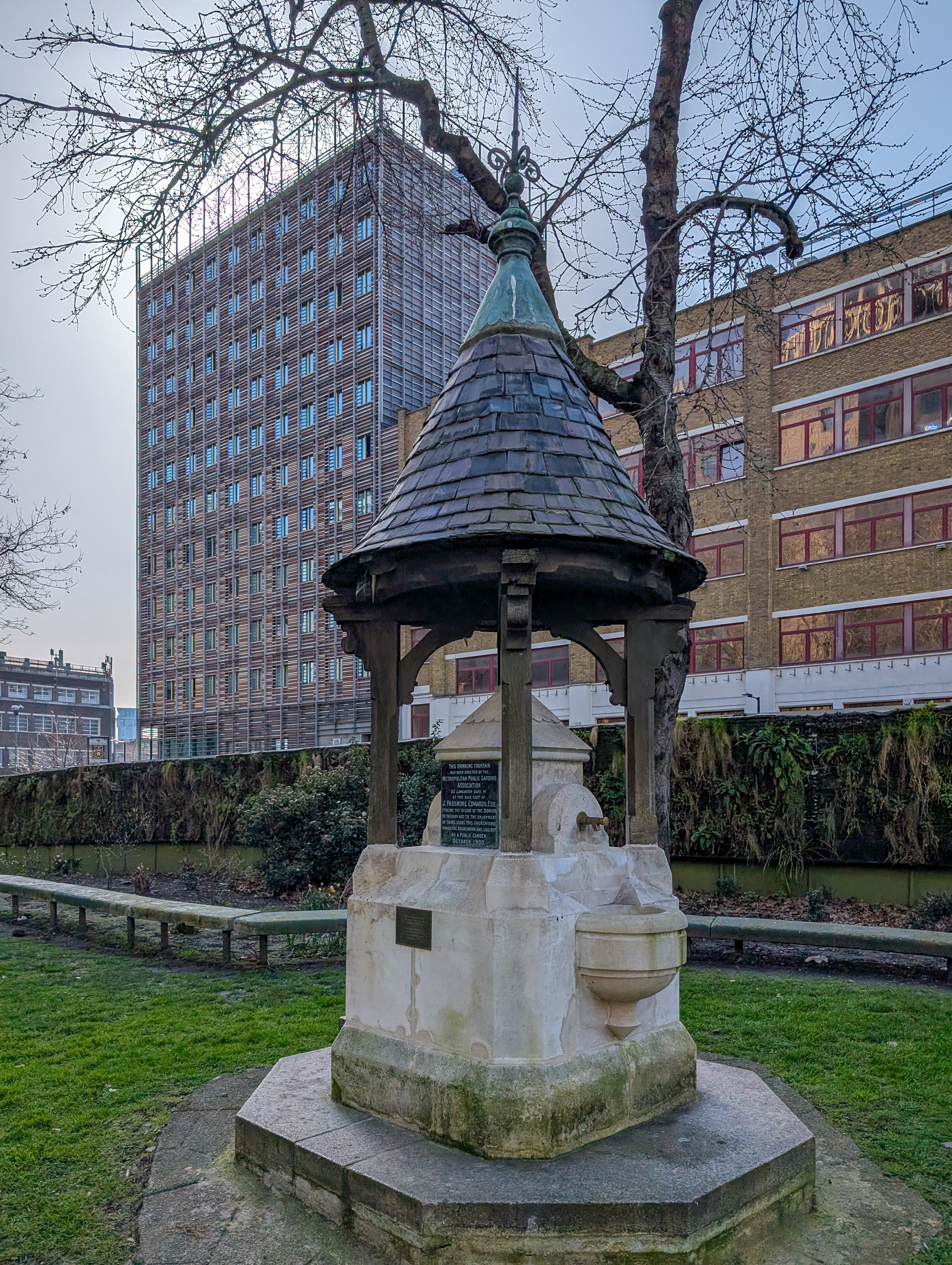
The Grade II listed drinking fountain in the church garden

== Features ==
The church has two large sequences of stained glass, one of 1959 by Kenneth Bunton, the other of 1984 celebrating the church's 25th anniversary by John Lawson, both showing features of life within the parish. The first range memorably includes a London Transport bus. The latter range includes buildings as diverse as Sampson House, the Lloyds Bank Computer Centre, Sea Containers House, the Kirkaldy Testing Museum and a J Sainsbury supermarket. Some of the industries and commercial businesses depicted in the 1984 glass have since left the area. The stained glass in the nave and sanctuary is the work of Frederick Cole. The church hall is the Wapping Memorial Sculpture by Ian Walters: New Regime (1989).

The post-war building included the installation of a 1939 Percy Daniel & Co organ by Noel Mander of Mander Organs. This was removed in 1984. The organ in the church that had been destroyed by bombing was an 1871 Henry Jones instrument, which had been restored in 1939 by Percy Daniel. In turn, Jones had rebuilt an earlier 1809 Thomas Elliot instrument.

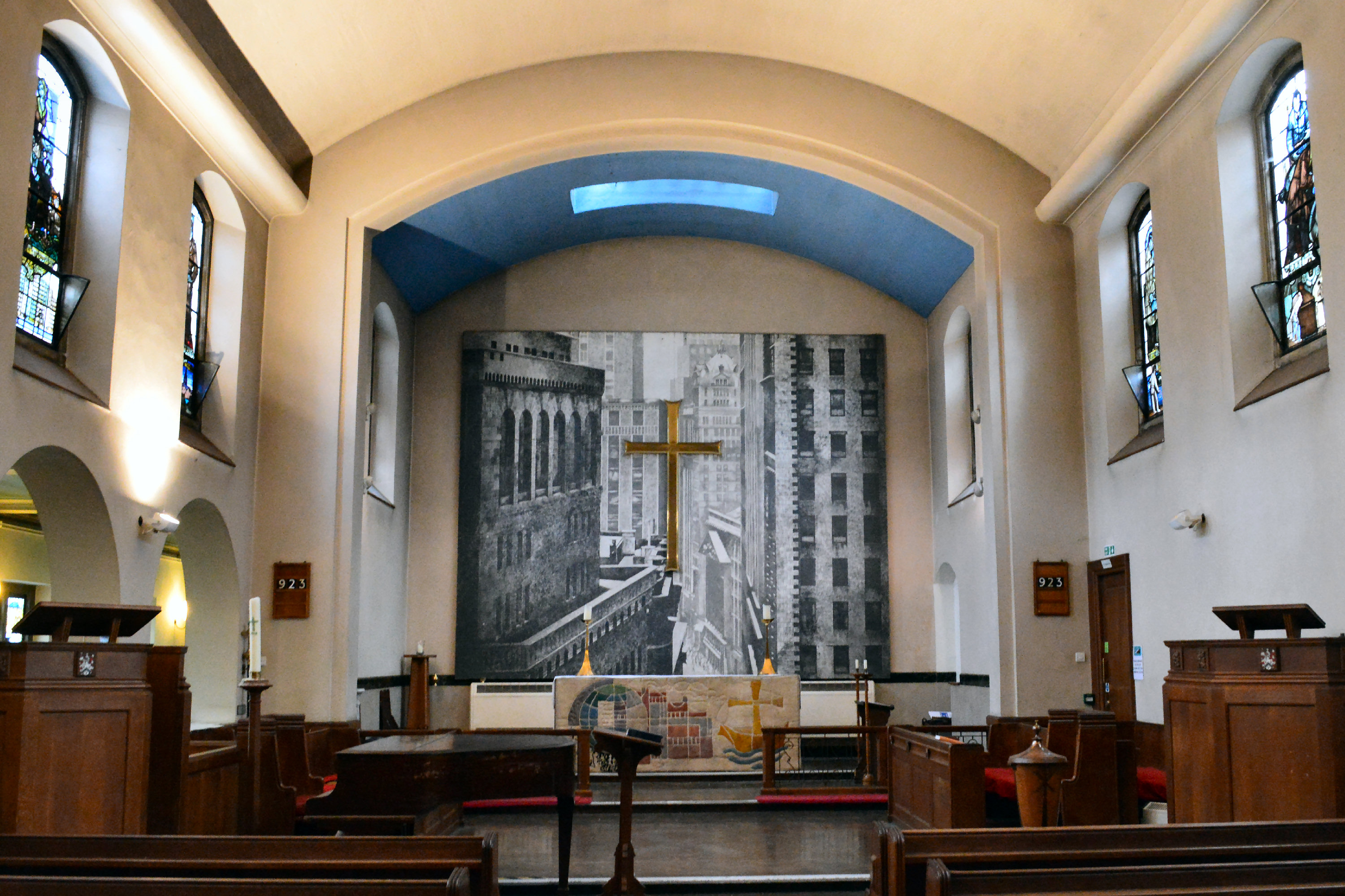
New York Wall Street mural

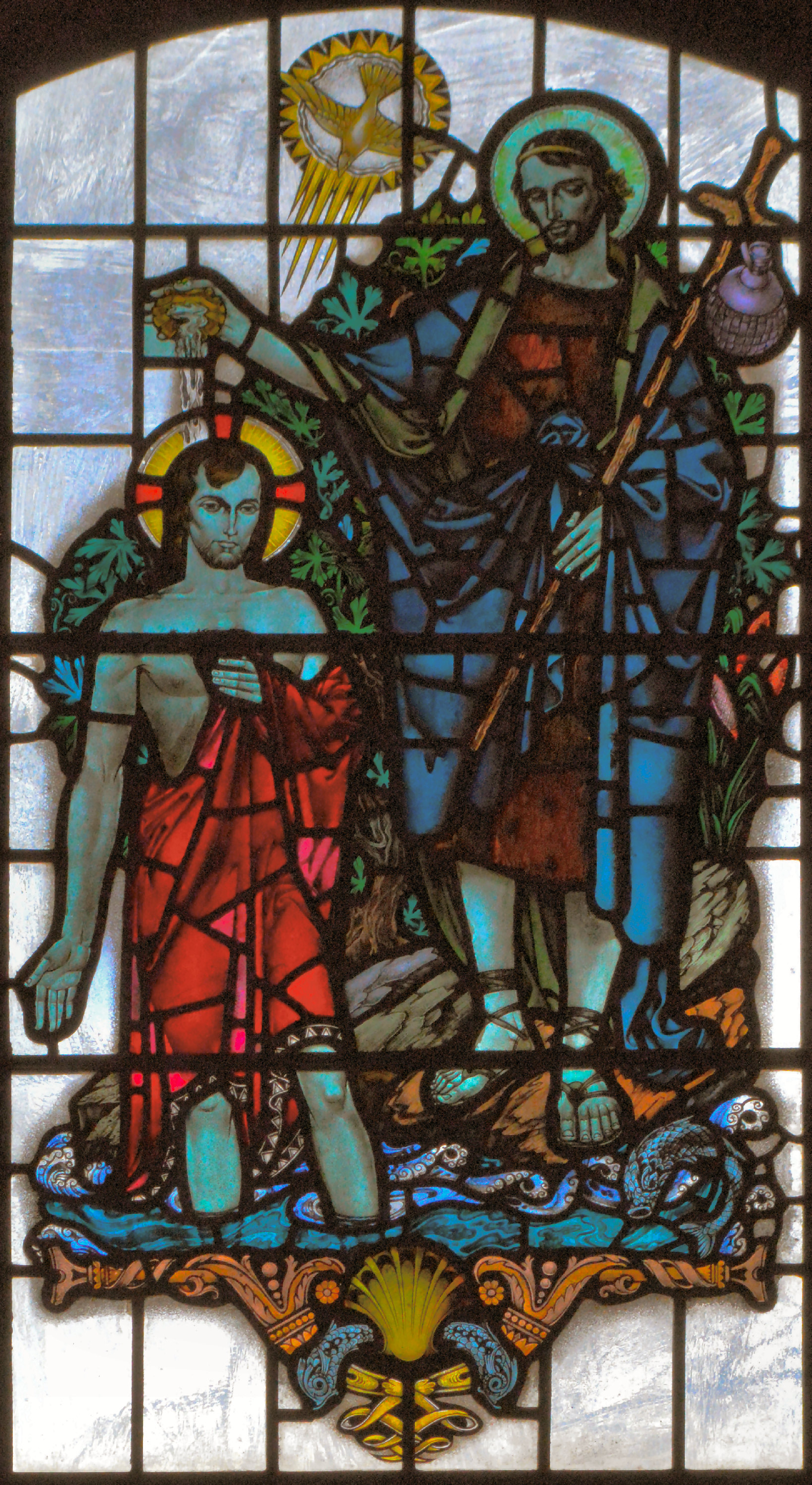
Baptism

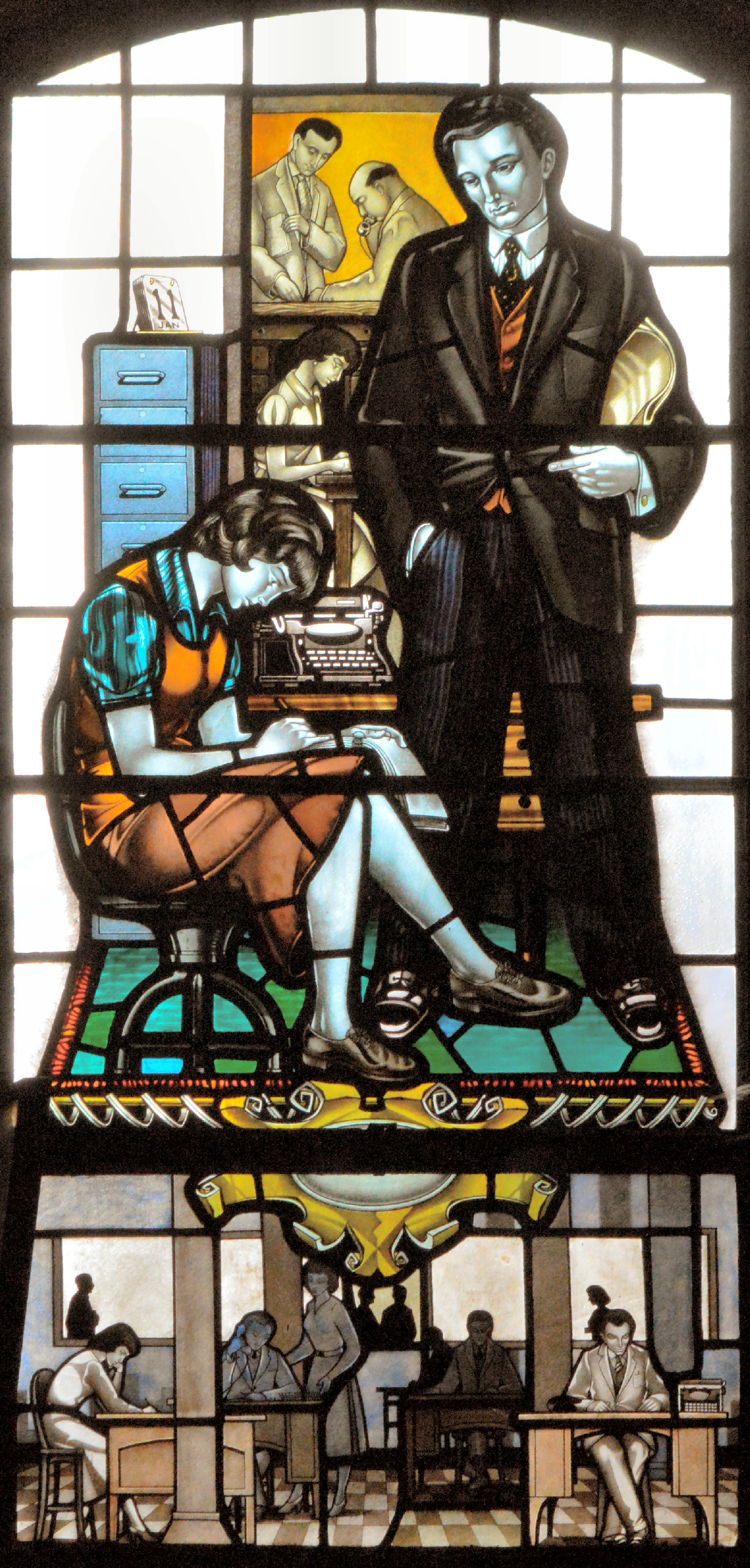
An office in the 1950s

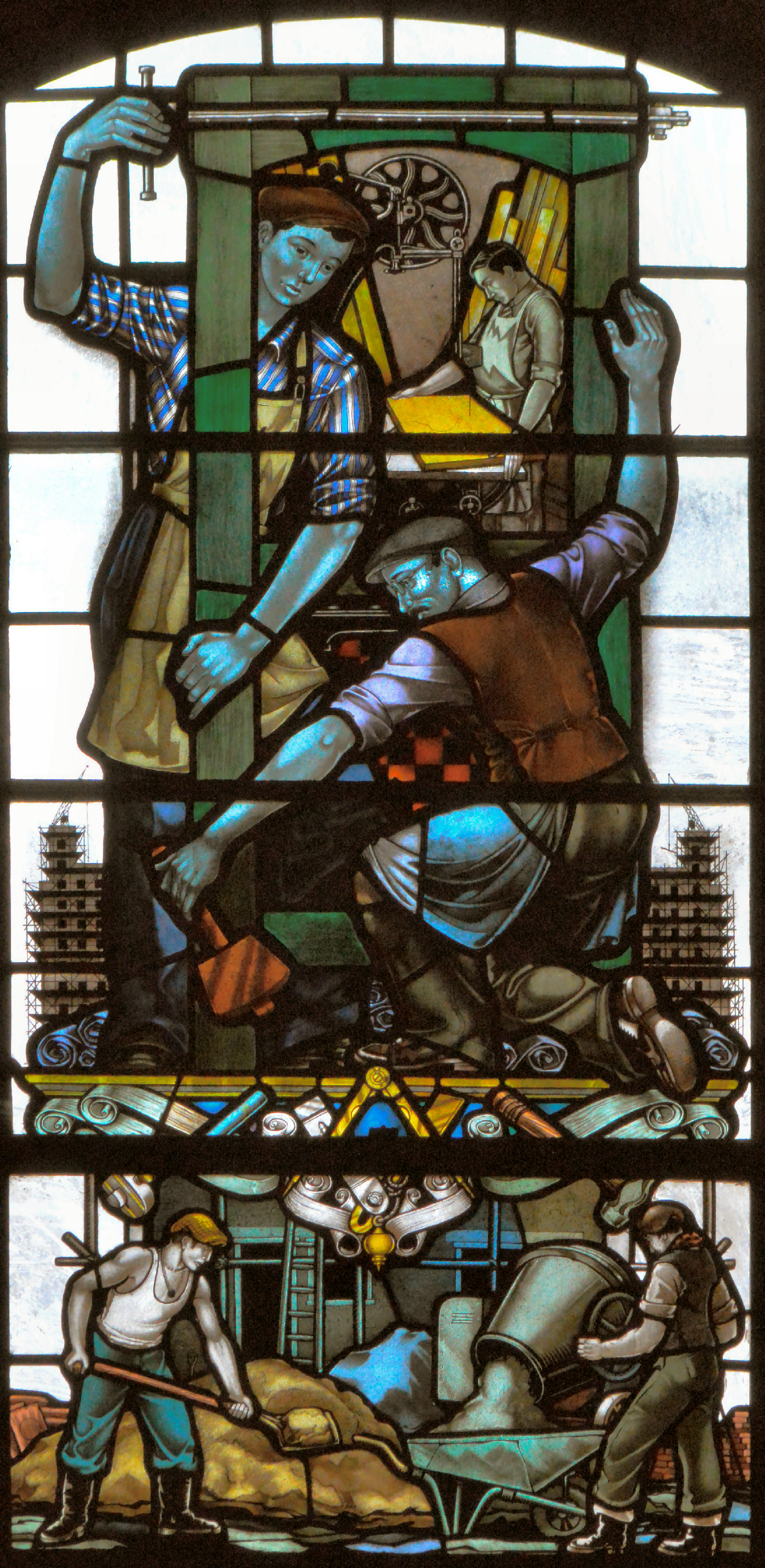
Carpenters and labourers

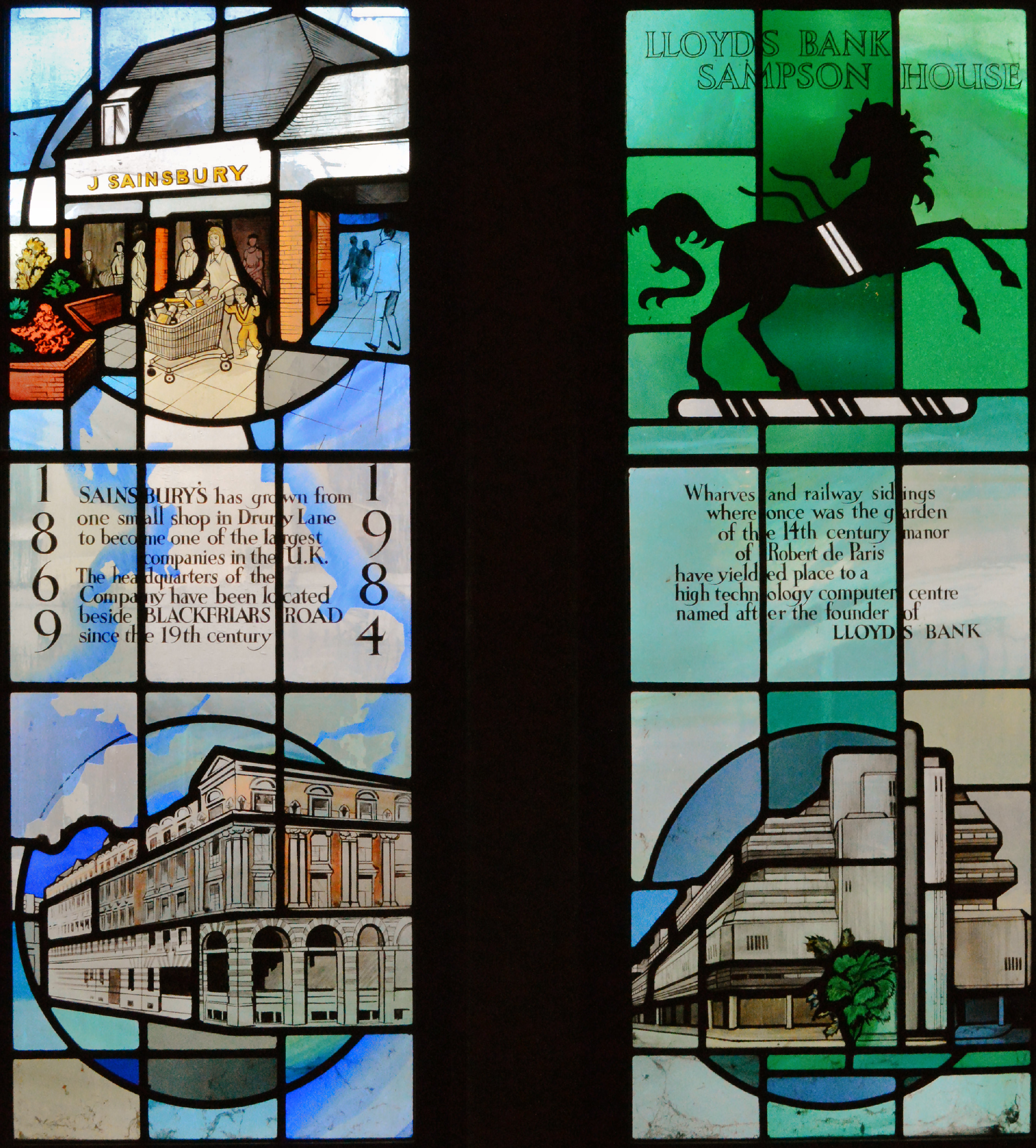
Sainsbury's & Lloyds Bank

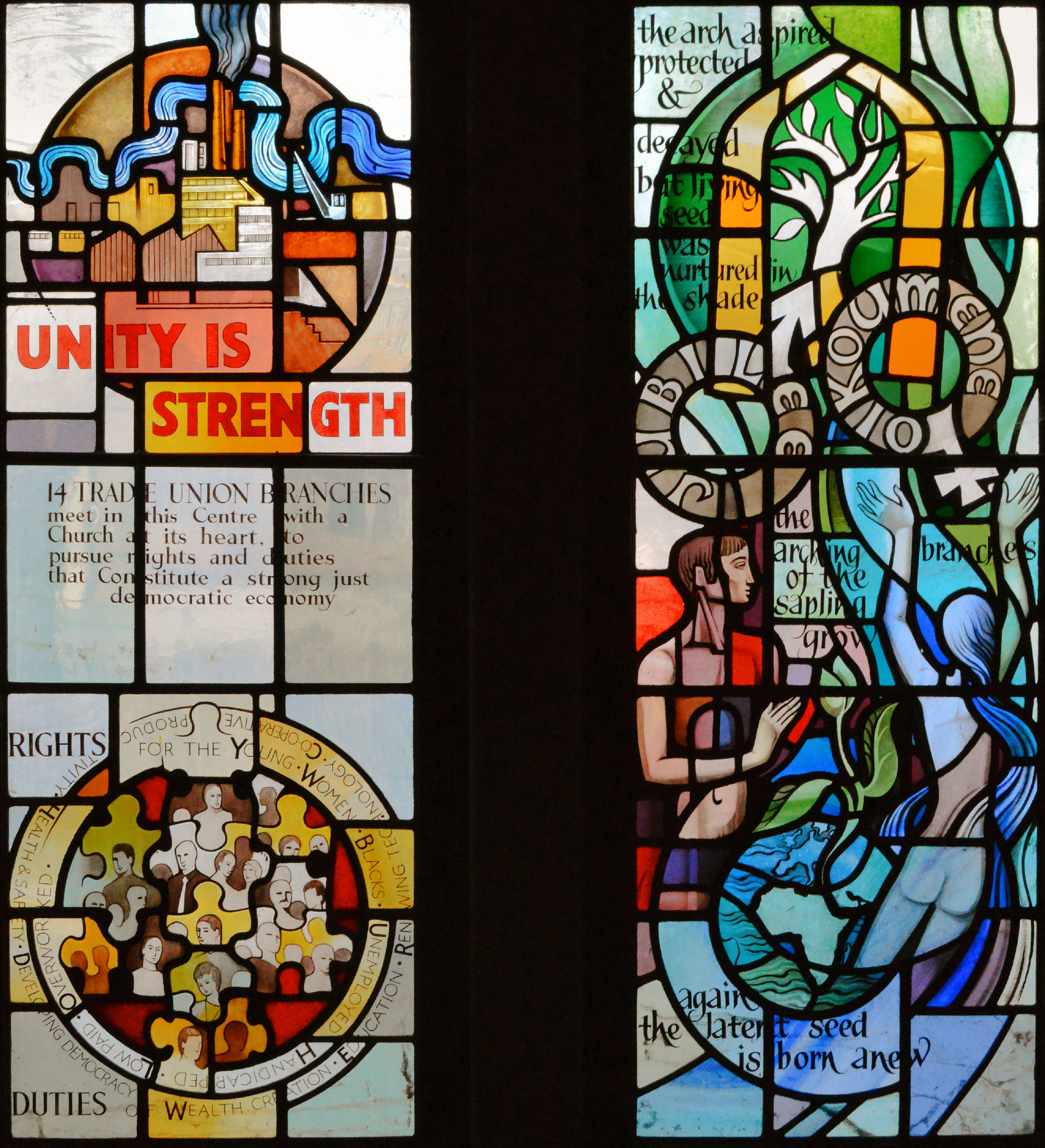
Trade Unions & New Life

== See also ==
- List of Churches in Southwark
- Anglican Diocese of Southwark

== Notes ==
- Printed information sheet “John Marshall’s Charity” ca 1995, provided by Clerk to the Trustees.
- Papers of the United Charities of Christchurch.
- Report of the Charity Commission South London Parish Charities 1822 pp72–75.
- Report of the Charity Commission South London Parish Charities 1890 pp 92–99
