= List of acts of the Parliament of Great Britain from 1747 =

This is a complete list of acts of the Parliament of Great Britain for the year 1747.

For acts passed until 1707, see the list of acts of the Parliament of England and the list of acts of the Parliament of Scotland. See also the list of acts of the Parliament of Ireland.

For acts passed from 1801 onwards, see the list of acts of the Parliament of the United Kingdom. For acts of the devolved parliaments and assemblies in the United Kingdom, see the list of acts of the Scottish Parliament, the list of acts of the Northern Ireland Assembly, and the list of acts and measures of Senedd Cymru; see also the list of acts of the Parliament of Northern Ireland.

The number shown after each act's title is its chapter number. Acts are cited using this number, preceded by the year(s) of the reign during which the relevant parliamentary session was held; thus the Union with Ireland Act 1800 is cited as "39 & 40 Geo. 3. c. 67", meaning the 67th act passed during the session that started in the 39th year of the reign of George III and which finished in the 40th year of that reign. Note that the modern convention is to use Arabic numerals in citations (thus "41 Geo. 3" rather than "41 Geo. III").

Acts of the last session of the Parliament of Great Britain and the first session of the Parliament of the United Kingdom are both cited as "41 Geo. 3". Acts passed by the Parliament of Great Britain did not have a short title; however, some of these acts have subsequently been given a short title by acts of the Parliament of the United Kingdom (such as the Short Titles Act 1896).

Before the Acts of Parliament (Commencement) Act 1793 came into force on 8 April 1793, acts passed by the Parliament of Great Britain were deemed to have come into effect on the first day of the session in which they were passed. Because of this, the years given in the list below may in fact be the year before a particular act was passed.

== 21 Geo. 2 ==
The first session of the 10th Parliament of Great Britain, which met from 10 November 1747 until 13 May 1748.

This session was also traditionally cited as 21 G. 2.

=== Public acts ===
Short title	Citation	Royal assent
Long title
Taxation Act 1747 (repealed)	21 Geo. 2. c. 1	16 December 1747
An Act for continuing the Duties upon Malt, Mum, Cyder, and Perry, in that Part of Great Britain called England, and for granting to His Majesty certain Duties upon Malt, Mum, Cyder, and Perry, in that Part of Great Britain called Scotland, for the Service of the Year One Thousand Seven Hundred and Forty-eight. (Repealed by Statute Law Revision Act 1867 (30 & 31 Vict. c. 59))
National Debt Act 1747 (repealed)	21 Geo. 2. c. 2	18 February 1748
An Act for granting to His Majesty a Subsidy of Poundage upon all Goods and Merchandizes to be imported into this Kingdom, and for raising a certain Sum of Money, by Annuities and a Lottery, to be charged on the said Subsidy, and for repealing so much of an Act made in the Twentieth Year of His present Majesty's Reign, (Note: Stamps Act 1746 (20 Geo. 2. c. 45)) as enacts, that Prize Goods and Merchandize may be exported without paying any Duty of Custom or Excise for the same. (Repealed by Statute Law Revision Act 1870 (33 & 34 Vict. c. 69))
Vexatious Arrests Act 1747 (repealed)	21 Geo. 2. c. 3	18 February 1748
An Act to revive and make perpetual Two Acts of Parliament, One, made in the Twelfth Year of the Reign of His late Majesty King George the First, intituled, "An Act to prevent frivolous and vexatious Arrests," (Note: Frivolous Arrests Act 1725 (12 Geo. 1. c. 29)) and the other, made in the Fifth Year of His present Majesty's Reign, (Note: Process for Small Debts Act 1731 (5 Geo. 2. c. 27)) to explain, amend, and render more effectual, the said Act. (Repealed by Statute Law Revision Act 1867 (30 & 31 Vict. c. 59))
Assurance on French Ships Act 1747 (repealed)	21 Geo. 2. c. 4	25 March 1748
An Act to prohibit Assurance on Ships belonging to France, and on Merchandizes or Effects laden thereon, during the present War with France. (Repealed by Statute Law Revision Act 1867 (30 & 31 Vict. c. 59))
Durham Roads Act 1747 (repealed)	21 Geo. 2. c. 5	25 March 1748
An Act for repairing the High Road from the Town of Bowes, in the County of York, to Barnard Castle, in the County of Durham, and from thence, through Staindrop, to Newgate, in Bishop Aukland, and from Newgate, along Gibb Chair, to Gaundless Bridge, and from thence, by Melderston Gill, otherwise Coundon Gill, to the Turnpike Road near Sunderland Bridge, in the County of Durham. (Repealed by Boroughbridge and Durham Road Act 1792 (32 Geo. 3. c. 135))
Mutiny Act 1747 (repealed)	21 Geo. 2. c. 6	25 March 1748
An Act for punishing Mutiny and Desertion, and for the better Payment of the Army and their Quarters. (Repealed by Statute Law Revision Act 1867 (30 & 31 Vict. c. 59))
Land Tax Act 1747 (repealed)	21 Geo. 2. c. 7	25 March 1748
An Act for granting an Aid to His Majesty, by a Land Tax, to be raised in Great Britain, for the Service of the Year One Thousand Seven Hundred and Forty-eight. (Repealed by Statute Law Revision Act 1867 (30 & 31 Vict. c. 59))
West Ham Waterworks Act 1747 (repealed)	21 Geo. 2. c. 8	25 March 1748
An Act for empowering George Montgomerie and Thomas Byrd Esquires, and Ezra Patching, to complete an Undertaking, for furnishing the Inhabitants of the several Parishes and Places of Stratford, Westham, Bow, Bromley, Mile-End, Stepney, and other Parishes and Places adjacent, with Water, and for better securing then Property in such Undertaking. (Repealed by East London Waterworks (No. 2) Act 1852 (15 & 16 Vict. c. clxiv))
Indemnity Act 1747 (repealed)	21 Geo. 2. c. 9	25 March 1748
An Act to indemnify Persons who have omitted to qualify themselves for Offices and Employments within the Time limited by Law, and for allowing further Time for that Purpose. (Repealed by Statute Law Revision Act 1867 (30 & 31 Vict. c. 59))
Window Duties Act 1747 (repealed)	21 Geo. 2. c. 10	13 May 1748
An Act for explaining, amending, and further enforcing, the Execution of an Act passed in the last Session of Parliament, intituled, "An Act for repealing the several Rates and Duties upon Houses, Windows, and Lights, and for granting to His Majesty other Rates and Duties upon Houses, Windows, or Lights, and for raising the Sum of Four Millions Four Hundred Thousand Pounds by Annuities, to be charged on the said Rates or Duties." (Note: National Debt Act 1746 (20 Geo. 2. c. 3)) (Repealed by House Tax Act 1803 (43 Geo. 3. c. 161))
Navy Act 1747 (repealed)	21 Geo. 2. c. 11	13 May 1748
An Act for further regulating the Proceedings upon Courts Martial in the Sea Service, and for extending the Discipline of the Navy to the Crews of His Majesty's Ships wrecked, lost, or taken, and for continuing to them their Wages, upon certain Conditions. (Repealed by Navy Act 1748 (22 Geo. 2. c. 33))
Buckinghamshire Assizes Act 1747 (repealed)	21 Geo. 2. c. 12	13 May 1748
An Act for holding the Summer Assizes for the County of Buckingham at the County Town of Buckingham. (Repealed by Statute Law Revision Act 1867 (30 & 31 Vict. c. 59))
Mutiny Act (No. 2) 1747 (repealed)	21 Geo. 2. c. 13	13 May 1748
An Act to rectify a Mistake in an Act made in this Session of Parliament, intituled, "An Act for punishing Mutiny and Desertion, and for the better Payment of the Army and then Quarters." (Note: Mutiny Act 1747 (21 Geo. 2. c. 6)) (Repealed by Statute Law Revision Act 1867 (30 & 31 Vict. c. 59))
Exportation, etc. Act 1747 (repealed)	21 Geo. 2. c. 14	13 May 1748
An Act for permitting Tea to be exported to Ireland and His Majesty's Plantations in America, without paying the Inland Duties charged thereupon by an Act of the Eighteenth Year of His present Majesty's Reign, (Note: Inland Duties, etc. Act 1744 (18 Geo. 2. c. 26)) and for enlarging the Time for some of the Payments to be made on the Subscription of Six Millions Three Hundred Thousand Pounds, by virtue of an Act of this Session of Parliament (Note: National Debt Act 1747 (21 Geo. 2. c. 2)) (Repealed by Statute Law Revision Act 1867 (30 & 31 Vict. c. 59))
Lancashire Roads Act 1747 (repealed)	21 Geo. 2. c. 15	13 May 1748
An Act for enlarging the Term and Powers granted by an Act made in the Eighth Year of the Reign of His present Majesty, (Note: Yorkshire and Lancashire Roads Act 1734 (8 Geo. 2. c. 3)) for repairing the Roads from the Town of Manchester, leading through Newton, Failsworth, and Oldham, in the County Palatine of Lancaster, to Austerlands, in the Parish of Saddleworth, in the County of York, and for making the same more effectual. (Repealed by Manchester Roads Act 1771 (11 Geo. 3. c. 82))
Southampton Roads Act 1747 (repealed)	21 Geo. 2. c. 16	13 May 1748
An Act for enlarging the Term and Powers granted by an Act passed in the Tenth Year of the Reign of His present Majesty, (Note: Southampton Roads Act 1736 (10 Geo. 2. c. 12)) for repairing the Road from Hertford Bridge Hill to the Town of Basingstoke, and also the Road from Hertford Bridge Hill aforesaid to the Town of Odiham, in the County of Southampton, and for making the said Act more effectual. (Repealed by Bagshot and Basingstoke and Odiham Roads Act 1819 (59 Geo. 3. c. vii))
Title Deeds Lost by Rebellion in Scotland Act 1747 (repealed)	21 Geo. 2. c. 17	13 May 1748
An Act to render more effectual an Act made in the Twentieth Year of His Majesty's Reign, intituled, "An Act for Relief of such of His Majesty's loyal Subjects in that Part of Great Britain called Scotland, whose Title Deeds and Writings were destroyed or carried off by the Rebels in the late Rebellion." (Note: Title Deeds Lost by Rebellion in Scotland Act 1746 (20 Geo. 2. c. 20)) (Repealed by Statute Law Revision Act 1867 (30 & 31 Vict. c. 59))
Fen Drainage Act 1747	21 Geo. 2. c. 18	13 May 1748
An Act for draining and preserving certain Fen Lands, in the several Parishes of Maney, Upwell, Welney, Downham, Witcham, and in a certain extraparochial Place in Byal Fon, within the Isle of Ely, and County of Cambridge.
Sheriffs (Scotland) Act 1747 (repealed)	21 Geo. 2. c. 19	13 May 1748
An Act for the more effectual Trial and Punishment of High Treason and Misprision of High Treason, in the Highlands of Scotland; and for abrogating the Practice of taking down the Evidence in Writing in certain Criminal Prosecutions; and for making some further Regulations relating to Sheriffs Depute and Stewarts Depute, and their Substitutes; and for other Purposes therein mentioned. (Repealed by Statute Law Revision Act 1867 (30 & 31 Vict. c. 59), Statute Law Revision Act 1883 (46 & 47 Vict. c. 39), Statute Law Revision Act 1892 (55 & 56 Vict. c. 19), Sheriff Courts (Scotland) Act 1907 (7 Edw. 7. c. 51) and Circuit Courts and Criminal Procedure (Scotland) Act 1925 (15 & 16 Geo. 5. c. 81))
Warwick, Stafford and Worcester Roads Act 1747 (repealed)	21 Geo. 2. c. 20	13 May 1748
An Act for enlarging the Term and Powers granted by an Act passed in the Thirteenth Year of the Reign of His late Majesty King George the First, (Note: Birmingham and Wednesbury Roads Act 1726 (13 Geo. 1. c. 14)) for repairing the several Roads leading from Birmingham, through the Town of Wednesbury, to a Place called High Bullen, and to Great Bridge, and from thence to the End of Gibbet Lane next adjoining to the Township of Bilson, and from Great Bridge, through Dudley, to King Swinford, and to the further End of Brittel Lane, in the Counties of Warwick, Stafford, and Worcester. (Repealed by Birmingham and Wednesbury Roads Act 1832 (2 & 3 Will. 4. c. vi) and Dudley and Brettell Lane District of Roads Act 1832 (2 & 3 Will. 4. c. lxxxiv))
Bury Saint Edmunds (Poor Relief) Act 1747 (repealed)	21 Geo. 2. c. 21	13 May 1748
An Act for erecting Workhouses, for the better employing and maintaining the Poor, within the Borough of Bury Saint Edmunds, in the County of Suffolk, and for the better repairing and paving the Streets and Highways there. (Repealed by Local Government Board's Provisional Order Confirmation (Poor Law) Act 1906 (6 Edw. 7. c. cvii))
Bromsgrove to Birmingham Roads Act 1747 (repealed)	21 Geo. 2. c. 22	13 May 1748
An Act for enlarging the Term and Powers granted by an Act passed in the Thirteenth Year of the Reign of His late Majesty King George the First, intituled, "An Act for repairing the Roads leading from the Town of Bromsgrave, to the Town of Dudley, in the County of Worcester, and from the said Town of Bromsgrove to the Town of Birmingham, in the County of Warwick," (Note: Bromsgrove and Birmingham Roads Act 1726 (13 Geo. 1. c. 15)) so far as the said Act relates to repairing the Roads leading from the Town of Birmingham to the Town of Bromsgrove, in the County of Worcester, and for making the same more effectual. (Repealed by Bromsgrove and Birmingham Road Act 1819 (59 Geo. 3. c. xlix))
Supply, etc. Act 1747 (repealed)	21 Geo. 2. c. 23	13 May 1748
An Act for granting to His Majesty the Sum of One Million, out of the Sinking Fund, for the Service of the Year One Thousand Seven Hundred and Forty-eight, and for applying a Sum of Money remaining in the Exchequer, arisen by the Rates and Duties on Houses which determined at Lady-day One Thousand Seven Hundred and Forty-seven, and for the further appropriating the Supplies granted in this Session of Parliament, and for applying a certain Sum of Money, for defraying the Charge of the Allowances for the Year One Thousand Seven Hundred and Forty-eight, to several Officers and Private Gentlemen of the Two Troops of Horse Guards and Three Regiments of House, lately reduced. (Repealed by Statute Law Revision Act 1867 (30 & 31 Vict. c. 59))
Liverpool Improvement Act 1747	21 Geo. 2. c. 24	13 May 1748
An Act for building a Church in the Town of Liverpool, in the County Palatine of Lancaster, and for enlightening and cleansing the Streets of the said Town, and for keeping and maintaining a Nightly Watch there.
Wolverhampton Roads Act 1747 (repealed)	21 Geo. 2. c. 25	13 May 1748
An Act for repairing the Roads leading from Sutton Colefield Common to the Town of Walsall, and from Sneals Green to Walsall, and from Walsall to Park Brook, which divides the Parishes of Wolverhampton and Walsall, and from Gibbet Lane to Wolverhampton, and from Compton to the End of the County of Stafford, and from Wolverhampton to The Wergs, and from thence to Shiffnal, and from The Wergs to Hales Heath, and from Wolverhampton to Cannock Wood, in the Road to Litchfield. (Repealed by Wolverhampton Roads in Staffordshire and Salop Act 1831 (1 & 2 Will. 4. c. xxv))
Cambrics Act 1747 (repealed)	21 Geo. 2. c. 26	13 May 1748
An Act for explaining, amending, and enforcing, an Act made in the Eighteenth Year of the Reign of His present Majesty, intituled, "An Act for prohibiting the Wearing and Importation of Cambricks and French Lawns." (Note: Cambrics Act 1744 (18 Geo. 2. c. 36)) (Repealed by Statute Law Revision Act 1867 (30 & 31 Vict. c. 59))
Durham Roads (No. 2) Act 1747 (repealed)	21 Geo. 2. c. 27	13 May 1748
An Act for repairing the High Road from Peirs Bridge, to Kirkmerrington, in the County of Durham, and from thence to the Turnpike Road at Tudhoe Lane End, in the said County. (Repealed by Durham Roads (No. 2) Act 1793 (33 Geo. 3. c. 161))
Highways Act 1747 (repealed)	21 Geo. 2. c. 28	13 May 1748
An Act to explain and amend an Act passed in the Fourteenth Year of His Majesty's Reign, intituled, "An Act for the Preservation of the Public Roads, in that Part of Great Britain called England," (Note: Preservation of Roads Act 1740 (14 Geo. 2. c. 42)) and so much of an Act passed in the Third Year of the Reign of King William and Queen Mary, intituled, "An Act for the better repairing and amending the Highways, and for settling the Rates of the Carriage of Goods," (Note: Highways, etc. Act 1691 (3 Will. & Mar. c. 12)) as relates to the settling the Rates of the Carriage of Goods. (Repealed by Turnpike Roads Act 1766 (7 Geo. 3. c. 40) and Rates of Carriage of Goods Act 1827 (7 & 8 Geo. 4. c. 39))
Orphans, London Act 1747 (repealed)	21 Geo. 2. c. 29	13 May 1748
An Act for the further Relief of the Orphans and other Creditors of the City of London, and for other Purposes therein mentioned. (Repealed by Statute Law (Repeals) Act 2013 (c. 2))
Importation of Indigo Act 1747 (repealed)	21 Geo. 2. c. 30	13 May 1748
An Act for encouraging the making of Indico in the British Plantations in America. (Repealed by Statute Law Revision Act 1867 (30 & 31 Vict. c. 59))
Insolvent Debtors Relief Act 1747 (repealed)	21 Geo. 2. c. 31	13 May 1748
An Act for Relief of Insolvent Debtors. (Repealed by Statute Law Revision Act 1867 (30 & 31 Vict. c. 59))
Mercers Company, London Act 1747	21 Geo. 2. c. 32	13 May 1748
An Act for the Relief of the Annuitants of the Wardens and Commonalty of the Mystery of Mercers of the City of London.
Insolvent Debtors Relief, etc. Act 1747 (repealed)	21 Geo. 2. c. 33	13 May 1748
An Act to continue and amend several Laws for the Relief of Debtors, with respect to the Imprisonment of their Persons, and to rectify a Mistake in an Act passed in the last Session of Parliament, (Note: Continuance of Laws Act 1746 (20 Geo. 2. c. 47)) for continuing several Laws therein mentioned, and to continue Two Acts, the One passed in the Nineteenth Year, (Note: Distemper Amongst Cattle Act 1745 (19 Geo. 2. c. 5)) the other in the Twentieth Year, (Note: Distemper Amongst Cattle Act 1746 (20 Geo. 2. c. 4)) of His present Majesty's Reign, to prevent the spreading of the Distemper amongst the Horned Cattle. (Repealed by Statute Law Revision Act 1867 (30 & 31 Vict. c. 59))
Cattle Theft (Scotland) Act 1747 or the Penal Act 1748 (repealed)	21 Geo. 2. c. 34	13 May 1748
An Act to amend and enforce so much of an Act made in the Nineteenth Year of His Majesty's Reign, (Note: Disarming the Highlands, etc. Act 1745 (19 Geo. 2. c. 39)) as relates to the more effectual disarming The Highlands in Scotland, and restraining the Use of the Highland Dress, and to Masters and Teachers of Private Schools, and Chaplains, and to explain a Clause in another Act, made in the same Year, (Note: Episcopal Meeting Houses (Scotland) Act 1745 (19 Geo. 2. c. 38)) relating to Letters of Orders of Episcopal Ministers in Scotland, and to oblige Persons allowed to carry Arms, and the Directors of the Banks there, and certain Persons belonging to, or practising in, the Courts of Session and Justiciary, to take the Oaths, and to repeal some Clauses in an Act made in the First Year of the Reign of His late Majesty King George the First, (Note: Treason in Scotland Act 1714 (1 Geo. 1. St. 2. c. 20)) whereby certain Encouragements are given to Landlords and Tenants in Scotland, who should continue in their Duty and Loyalty to His said late Majesty, and for other Purposes therein mentioned. (Repealed by Statute Law (Repeals) Act 1974 (c. 22))

=== Private acts ===
Short title	Citation	Royal assent
Long title
Naturalizing Caesar and Charles de Missy Act 1747	21 Geo. 2. c. 1 Pr.	16 December 1747
An Act for naturalizing Cæsar de Missy and Charles de Missy.
Earl Brooke's Estate Act 1747	21 Geo. 2. c. 2 Pr.	25 March 1748
An Act for vesting the settled Estate of the Right Honourable Francis Earl Brooke, in the County of Southampton, in Trustees, to be sold, and for laying out the Money arising thereby in the Purchase of other Hereditaments, of equal or greater Value, to be settled in Lieu thereof, and for other Purposes therein mentioned.
Lord Trentham's Marriage Settlement Act 1747	21 Geo. 2. c. 3 Pr.	25 March 1748
An Act for empowering Granville Leveson Gower, commonly called Lord Trentham, to raise Portions for Younger Children; and also to explain and amend certain Powers for making Jointures, in the Settlement made on his Marriage with Elizabeth his late Wife.
Stanley's Name Act 1747	21 Geo. 2. c. 4 Pr.	25 March 1748
An Act to enable James Stanley Esquire, commonly called Lord Strange, Eldest Son and Heir Apparent of Edward Earl of Derby, and his Issue by Lucy his Wife (late Lucy Smith), to take and use the Surname of Smith, and bear the Arms of Smith and Hertz.
Byng's Estate Act 1747	21 Geo. 2. c. 5 Pr.	25 March 1748
An Act for vesting the settled Estate late of the Honourable Robert Byng Esquire, deceased, and Elizabeth his Wife, in the County of Hertford, in Trustees, to be sold; and for applying the Money arising by such Sale for the Purposes therein mentioned.
Viscount Lanesborough's Will Act 1747	21 Geo. 2. c. 6 Pr.	25 March 1748
An Act for enroling the Will of George late Viscount Lanesborough, in the Kingdom of Ireland, and making the Exemplification thereof Evidence in all Courts in Great Britain and Ireland.
Badbury Inclosure Act 1747	21 Geo. 2. c. 7 Pr.	25 March 1748
An Act to confirm and establish an Agreement for enclosing and dividing certain Common Fields, in the Hamlet of Badbury, in the County of Wilts.
Burton's Name Act 1747	21 Geo. 2. c. 8 Pr.	25 March 1748
An Act to enable Robert Burton, lately called Robert Lingen, and the Heirs Male of his Body, to take and use the Surname of Burton only, pursuant to the Will of Thomas Burton Esquire, deceased.
Manors of Woking, Chobham and Bagshot Act 1747	21 Geo. 2. c. 9 Pr.	25 March 1748
An Act to enable His Majesty to grant the Inheritance of the Manors of Wookeing, Chabham, and Bagshott, and other Lands and Hereditaments, in the County of Surrey, to Abel Walter Esquire and his Heirs.
Naturalization of Anthony and David Andre and Others Act 1747	21 Geo. 2. c. 10 Pr.	25 March 1748
An Act for naturalizing Anthony Andrê, David André, and others.
Strode's Estate Act 1747	21 Geo. 2. c. 11 Pr.	13 May 1748
An Act for vesting a Morety of the late Sir George Strode's Estates, in the Counties of Dorset and Somerset, in the Right Honourable Francis Earl Brooke, as the same is now held and enjoyed by him, pursuant to Sir George Strode's Will, and the Partition of the said Estates made by virtue of a Decree of the Court of Chancery.
Humfreys' Estate Act 1747	21 Geo. 2. c. 12 Pr.	13 May 1748
An Act for the Sale of certain Lands, in the Parishes of Barking and Dagenham, in the County of Essex, Part of the Estate of the late Sir Orlando Humfreys Baronet, deceased, for the Purposes therein mentioned.
Carthew's Estate Act 1747	21 Geo. 2. c. 13 Pr.	13 May 1748
An Act for vesting divers Manors, Lands, and Hereditaments, in the County of Suffolk, late the Estate of Thomas Carthew Esquire, deceased, in his Executors, to enable them to convey the same, pursuant to Articles entered into for the Purchase thereof.
Fleetwood's Estate Act 1747	21 Geo. 2. c. 14 Pr.	13 May 1748
An Act for Sale of the Estate late of Henry Fleetwood Esquire, deceased, in the County of Lancaster, for raising Money, to discharge the Encumbrances affecting the same, and for laying out the Surplus of the Money arising by such Sale in the Purchase of other Lands and Hereditaments, to be settled to the Uses of a former Settlement.
Lloyd's Estate Act 1747	21 Geo. 2. c. 15 Pr.	13 May 1748
An Act for vesting certain Estates of Thomas Lloyd Esquire and Ann his Wife in Trustees, to be sold, for discharging Encumbrances affecting the same, and for settling other Estates to the Uses in their Marriage Settlement.
Dawson's Estate Act 1747	21 Geo. 2. c. 16 Pr.	13 May 1748
An Act for vesting the Equity of Redemption of divers Messuages, Lands, and Hereditaments, in Kingston upon Hull, and the County of York, late the Estate of George Dawson Esquire, deceased, in Roper Dawson his Eldest Son and Heir, upon his undertaking to discharge the several Encumbrances affecting the same, and to make a Provision for his Brothers and Sisters.
Confirmation and rendering more effectual an agreement between James Fox and John Bridges for exchanging lands in Cobham (Surrey).	21 Geo. 2. c. 17 Pr.	13 May 1748
An Act for confirming an Agreement between James Fox and John Bridges Esquires, for exchanging certain Lands, in the Parish of Cobham, in the County of Surrey, and for rendering the said Agreement more effectual for the Purposes thereby intended.
Chasin's Estate Act 1747	21 Geo. 2. c. 18 Pr.	13 May 1748
An Act for Sale of the settled Estate of George Chasin Esquire, in the Counties of Southampton and Surrey, for paying off and discharging several Debts and Encumbrances, and for settling Lands in the County of Somerset, in Lieu thereof, to the like Uses.
Bank's Estate Act 1747	21 Geo. 2. c. 19 Pr.	13 May 1748
An Act for vesting the settled Estate late of Joseph Banks the Elder Esquire, deceased, in the Parish of Saint James, within the Liberty of Westminster, in Trustees, in order to make Sale thereof, and for laying out the Money arising by such Sale in the Purchase of Lands, to be settled to the same Uses.
Naish's Estate Act 1747	21 Geo. 2. c. 20 Pr.	13 May 1748
An Act for confirming certain Articles of Agreement, between the Creditors of Hugh Naish Esquire and the Trustees named in an Act of Parliament of the Eleventh Year of His present Majesty, (Note: Estate of Hugh Naish Act 1737 (11 Geo. 2. c. 38)) for vesting the Real and Personal Estates of the said Hugh Naish in Trustees, for the Benefit of his Creditors, and for other Purposes therein mentioned.
Keck's Estate Act 1747	21 Geo. 2. c. 21 Pr.	13 May 1748
An Act for repealing of Part, and for explaining and amending other Parts, of an Act passed in the Eighteenth Year of the Reign of His present Majesty, intituled, "An Act for charging, selling, and applying, Part of the settled Estate of Anthony Keck Esquire, for raising Money, towards the Purchase of the Manors of Dalby and Broughton, in the County of Leicester, contracted for pursuant to the Will of Anthony Keck his Grandfather, and for other Purposes therein mentioned." (Note: Keck's Estate Act 1744 (18 Geo. 2. c. 20 Pr.))
Kynaston's Estate Act 1747	21 Geo. 2. c. 22 Pr.	13 May 1748
An Act for Sale of Part of the Estate late of Corbet Kynaston Esquire, deceased, for the Payment of Debts affecting the same, and for other Purposes therein mentioned.
Sheriff's Estate Act 1747	21 Geo. 2. c. 23 Pr.	13 May 1748
An Act for raising Money out of an Estate in the County of Middlesex, given by Lawrence Sheriff, for the founding and maintaining a School and Alms-houses at Rugby, in the County of Warwick, to be applied in re-building the said School, or purchasing One or more Messuage or Messuages, together with some Ground adjoining thereto, and for the Support of the said Charity.
Williams' Estates Act 1747	21 Geo. 2. c. 24 Pr.	13 May 1748
An Act for vesting the Estates of Richard Williams a Bankrupt (which were settled on his Marriage with Sarah Williams his present Wife) in the Assigness under the Commission of Bankruptcy awarded against him, to be sold, for Payment of his Debts, and for making a Provision for the said Sarah Williams and her Issue, in such Manner as therein is mentioned.
Faceby Inclosure Act 1747	21 Geo. 2. c. 25 Pr.	13 May 1748
An Act for enclosing, dividing, and exchanging, the Common Fields, Common Pastures, Common Meadows, and other Grounds, in the Manor and Township of Faceby, in Cleveland, in the North Riding of the County of York, and for providing certain Recompenses to the Impropriators and Vicar of Faceby, in Lieu of Tithes.
Drypool Inclosure Act 1747	21 Geo. 2. c. 26 Pr.	13 May 1748
An Act to confirm and establish an Agreement, for enclosing and dividing a large Open Common Pasture Ground, called Somergangs, otherwise Somergams, in the Parish of Drypool, in the County of York.
Holton Inclosure Act 1747	21 Geo. 2. c. 27 Pr.	13 May 1748
An Act for confirming and establishing Agreements, for enclosing and exchanging Lands in Holton, in the County of Lincoln, and for rendering the same more effectual for the Purposes thereby intended.
Langwith, Plesley, Stoney Houghton and Shirbrook (Derbyshire) inclosures.	21 Geo. 2. c. 28 Pr.	13 May 1748
An Act for enclosing certain Common Pasture Grounds, within the Manors and Parishes of Langwith and Plesley, and the Hamlets of Stoney Houghton and Shirbrook, in the said Parishes, in the County of Derby.
Weddell's Name Act 1747	21 Geo. 2. c. 29 Pr.	13 May 1748
An Act to enable Richard Weddell Esquire (lately called Richard Black) and his Issue to take and bear the Surname and Arms of Weddell, pursuant to the Will of Thomas Weddell Esquire, deceased, and for empowering the said Richard Weddell, and those in Remainder after him, to make Leases of the Estates devised to him and them by the said Will.
Thorbecke's Naturalization Act 1747	21 Geo. 2. c. 30 Pr.	13 May 1748
An Act for naturalizing John Thorbooke.
Neau's Naturalization Act 1747	21 Geo. 2. c. 31 Pr.	13 May 1748
An Act for naturalizing Peter Neau.

=== Sources ===
- Pickering, Danby, ed. (1765). The Statutes at Large. Vol. 19 - 20th to the 23rd Year of King George II. Printed by Joseph Bentham – via Internet Archive.
- Pickering, Danby, ed. (1765). The Statutes at Large. Vol. 19 - 20th to the 23rd Year of King George II – via Google Books.
- Journals of the House of Commons. Vol. 25. London: His Majesty's Stationery Office. 1803. pp. 416–660 – via Google Books.
- Chronological Table of and Index to the Statutes. Vol. 1: To the End of the Session 59 Vict. Sess. 2 (1895) (13th ed.). London: Her Majesty's Stationery Office. 1896. p. 111 – via Google Books.

== See also ==
- List of acts of the Parliament of Great Britain
