= Estate of Hugh Naish Act 1737 =

Act of the Parliament of Great Britain

- Act of Parliament
- Parliament of Great Britain
- Long title: An Act for vesting the Real and Personal Estate of Hugh Naish Esquire (who was late a Prisoner in His Majesty's Prison of The Fleet, and escaped out of the same) in Trustees, for the Benefit of his Creditors.
- Citation: 11 Geo. 2. c. 38
- Territorial extent: Great Britain

Dates
- Royal assent: 20 May 1738
- Commencement: 24 January 1738 (Note: Start of session.)
- Repealed: 30 July 1948
Other legislation
Amended by	Estate of Hugh Naish Act 1747
Repealed by	Statute Law Revision Act 1948

Status: Repealed

Text of statute as originally enacted

The Estate of Hugh Naish Act 1737 (11 Geo. 2. c. 38) was an act of the Parliament of Great Britain confirming articles of agreement between Hugh Naish and trustees (named in the act) concerning the real and personal estates of Hugh Naish.

His son Hugh, (Middle Temple, 1724) was committed to the Fleet Prison for debt on 29 June 1731 and found it best to stay there to avoid payment. An act was passed allowing creditors, from 1 January 1736, to obtain the release of prisoners who could pay. However, when the creditors required the Warden of the Fleet to produce Hugh junior (9 July 1737) he escaped ‘beyond seas’.

See also the Estate of Hugh Naish Act 1747 21 Geo. 2. c. 20 (1747), a private act allowing them to proceed against his estate, apart from an agreement of 6 December 1733 between Hugh senior's executors and creditor Edward Spelman.

== Subsequent developments ==
The whole act was repealed by section 1 of, and the first schedule to, the Statute Law Revision Act 1948 (11 & 12 Geo. 6. c. 62), which came into force on 30 July 1948.
