= Papists Act 1738 =

Act of the Parliament of Great Britain

- Act of Parliament
- Parliament of Great Britain
- Long title: An Act for allowing further time for Inrolment of Deeds and Wills made by Papists, and for Relief of Protestant Purchasers, Devisees and Lessees.
- Citation: 12 Geo. 2. c. 14
- Territorial extent: Great Britain

Dates
- Royal assent: 13 June 1739
- Commencement: 1 February 1739 (Note: Start of session.)
- Repealed: 15 July 1867
Other legislation
Repealed by	Statute Law Revision Act 1867
Relates to	Papists Act 1737

Status: Repealed

Text of statute as originally enacted

The Papists Act 1738 (12 Geo. 2. c. 14) was an act of the Parliament of Great Britain during the reign of George II. Its long title was "An Act for allowing further time for Inrolment of Deeds and Wills made by Papists, and for Relief of Protestant Purchasers, Devisees and Lessees".

== Subsequent developments ==
The whole act was repealed by section 1 of, and the schedule to, the Statute Law Revision Act 1867 (30 & 31 Vict. c. 59).
