= List of acts of the Parliament of Great Britain from 1738 =

This is a complete list of acts of the Parliament of Great Britain for the year 1738.

For acts passed until 1707, see the list of acts of the Parliament of England and the list of acts of the Parliament of Scotland. See also the list of acts of the Parliament of Ireland.

For acts passed from 1801 onwards, see the list of acts of the Parliament of the United Kingdom. For acts of the devolved parliaments and assemblies in the United Kingdom, see the list of acts of the Scottish Parliament, the list of acts of the Northern Ireland Assembly, and the list of acts and measures of Senedd Cymru; see also the list of acts of the Parliament of Northern Ireland.

The number shown after each act's title is its chapter number. Acts are cited using this number, preceded by the year(s) of the reign during which the relevant parliamentary session was held; thus the Union with Ireland Act 1800 is cited as "39 & 40 Geo. 3. c. 67", meaning the 67th act passed during the session that started in the 39th year of the reign of George III and which finished in the 40th year of that reign. Note that the modern convention is to use Arabic numerals in citations (thus "41 Geo. 3" rather than "41 Geo. III"). Acts of the last session of the Parliament of Great Britain and the first session of the Parliament of the United Kingdom are both cited as "41 Geo. 3".

Acts passed by the Parliament of Great Britain did not have a short title; however, some of these acts have subsequently been given a short title by acts of the Parliament of the United Kingdom (such as the Short Titles Act 1896).

Before the Acts of Parliament (Commencement) Act 1793 came into force on 8 April 1793, acts passed by the Parliament of Great Britain were deemed to have come into effect on the first day of the session in which they were passed. Because of this, the years given in the list below may in fact be the year before a particular act was passed.

== 12 Geo. 2 ==
The fifth session of the 8th Parliament of Great Britain, which met from 1 February 1739 until 14 June 1739.

This session was also traditionally cited as 12 G. 2.

=== Public acts ===
Short title	Citation	Royal assent
Long title
Taxation Act 1738 (repealed)	12 Geo. 2. c. 1	26 February 1739
An Act for continuing the Duties upon Malt, Mum, Cyder, and Perry, in that Part of Great Britain called England; and for granting to His Majesty certain Duties upon Malt, Mum, Cyder, and Perry, in that Part of Great Britain called Scotland, for the Service of the Year One Thousand Seven Hundred and Thirty-nine. (Repealed by Statute Law Revision Act 1867 (30 & 31 Vict. c. 59))
Mutiny Act 1738 (repealed)	12 Geo. 2. c. 2	15 March 1739
An Act for punishing Mutiny and Desertion, and for the better Payment of the Army and their Quarters. (Repealed by Statute Law Revision Act 1867 (30 & 31 Vict. c. 59))
Land Tax Act 1738 (repealed)	12 Geo. 2. c. 3	19 April 1739
An Act for granting an Aid to His Majesty, by a Land Tax, to be raised in Great Britain, for the Service of the Year One Thousand Seven Hundred and Thirty-nine. (Repealed by Statute Law Revision Act 1867 (30 & 31 Vict. c. 59))
Saint Nicholas, Worcester Act 1738 (repealed)	12 Geo. 2. c. 4	19 April 1739
An Act to enable the Inhabitants of the Parish of Saint Nicholas, in the City of Worcester, to raise Money, for discharging the Debts they have contracted in re-building their Parish Church. (Repealed by Statute Law (Repeals) Act 1998 (c. 43))
Coinage Duties Act 1738 (repealed)	12 Geo. 2. c. 5	19 April 1739
An Act to continue the Duties for Encouragement of the Coinage of Money. (Repealed by Statute Law Revision Act 1867 (30 & 31 Vict. c. 59))
Indemnity Act 1738 (repealed)	12 Geo. 2. c. 6	19 April 1739
An Act to indemnify Persons who have omitted to qualify themselves for Offices and Employments within the Time limited by Law; and for allowing further Time for that Purpose. (Repealed by Statute Law Revision Act 1867 (30 & 31 Vict. c. 59))
Ealing Church Act 1738 (repealed)	12 Geo. 2. c. 7	19 April 1739
An Act to enable the Parishioners of the Parish of Ealing, in the County of Middlesex, to raise Money, by Rates upon themselves, for finishing the Church of the said Parish. (Repealed by Statute Law (Repeals) Act 2013 (c. 2))
Stamford and Grantham Road Act 1738 (repealed)	12 Geo. 2. c. 8	19 April 1739
An Act for repairing the Road between Stamford and Grantham, in the County of Lincoln. (Repealed by Barnsley Canal Act 1808 (48 Geo. 3. c. xiii) and Road from Foston Bridge (Lincolnshire) Act 1808 (48 Geo. 3. c. lxiii))
Woolwich Church Act 1738 (repealed)	12 Geo. 2. c. 9	19 April 1739
An Act for applying a Sum of Money, given by the Will of Daniel Wiseman Esquire, deceased, for finishing the new Church at Woolwich, in the County of Kent; and for raising an Annuity, by an Assessment on the Parish of Woolwich, during the Lives of Mary Wiseman and Elizabeth Crouch, and the Life of the Survivor of them, pursuant to the said Will. (Repealed by Statute Law (Repeals) Act 2013 (c. 2))
Lincoln (City) Roads Act 1738 (repealed)	12 Geo. 2. c. 10	19 April 1739
An Act for repairing the Roads from the North West Parts of the County of Lincoln, through Nettlam Fields, Wraghy Lane, and Baumber Fields, to The Wolds, or North East Part of the said County. (Repealed by Roads in Lincoln Act 1806 (46 Geo. 3. c. lxx))
Berkshire Roads Act 1738 (repealed)	12 Geo. 2. c. 11	19 April 1739
An Act for enlarging the Term and Powers granted by an Act passed in the 6th Year of the Reign of His present Majesty, (Note: Fyfield and St. John's Bridge Road Act 1732 (6 Geo. 2. c. 16)) for repairing the Road from Fyfield, in the County of Berks, to Saint John's Bridge, in the County of Glocester; and for repairing the Roads from an Inn called The Hind's Head, in the Parish of Kingston Bagpuze, in the said County of Berks, to that Part of New Bridge which stands in the said County of Berks. (Repealed by Fyfield and St. John's Bridge, and Kingston Bagpuize and Newbridge Roads Act 1833 (3 & 4 Will. 4. c. xci))
Derbyshire Roads Act 1738	12 Geo. 2. c. 12	14 June 1739
An Act for repairing the Roads from Bakewell to Chesterfield, in the County of Derby; and from Chesterfield to Worksopp, in the County of Nottingham; and from Chesterfield, to the Place where the Northern Road meets the Chesterfield Road which leads to Mansfield, in the said County of Nottingham.
Price of Bread, etc. Act 1738 (repealed)	12 Geo. 2. c. 13	14 June 1739
An Act for continuing the Act made in the Eighth Year of the Reign of Her late Majesty Queen Anne, (Note: Price and Assise of Bread Act 1709 (8 Ann. c. 19)) to regulate the Price and Assize of Bread; and for continuing, explaining, and amending, the Act made in the Second Year of the Reign of His present Majesty, (Note: Attorneys and Solicitors Act 1728 (2 Geo. 2. c. 23)) for the better Regulation of Attornies and Solicitors. (Repealed by Statute Law Revision Act 1867 (30 & 31 Vict. c. 59))
Papists Act 1738 (repealed)	12 Geo. 2. c. 14	14 June 1739
An Act for allowing further Time for Enrolment of Deeds and Wills made by Papists; and for Relief of Protestant Purchasers, Devisees, and Lessees. (Repealed by Statute Law Revision Act 1867 (30 & 31 Vict. c. 59))
Provision for Duke of Cumberland, etc. Act 1738 (repealed)	12 Geo. 2. c. 15	14 June 1739
An Act to enable His Majesty to settle an Annuity of Fifteen Thousand Pounds on his Royal Highness the Duke of Cumberland and the Heirs of his Body; and also One other Annuity of Twenty-four Thousand Pounds on their Royal Highnesses the Princess Amelie, the Princess Caroline, the Princess Mary, and the Princess Lovisa. (Repealed by Statute Law Revision Act 1867 (30 & 31 Vict. c. 59))
Egham and Bagshot Road Act 1738 (repealed)	12 Geo. 2. c. 16	14 June 1739
An Act for enlarging the Term and Powers granted by an Act passed in the First Year of the Reign of His present Majesty, intituled, "An Act for repairing the Road from the Powder Mills on Hounslow Heath, (Note: The Gunpowder Mills were located in Bedfont on the north of the A315 Staines Road, on Hounslow Heath, to the east of the River Crane. 51°27′32″N 0°24′06″W) in the County of Middlesex, to a Place called Basingstone, (Note: The Basing Stone was located near the former Jolly Farmer public house, at the junction of the A30 and A325 roads.) near the Town of Bagshot; in the Parish of Windlesham, in the County of Surrey." (Note: Egham and Bagshot Road Act 1727 (1 Geo. 2. St. 2. c. 6)) (Repealed by Hounslow Heath and Egham Hill Road Act 1809 (49 Geo. 3. c. lviii) and Egham Hill and Bagshot Road Act 1816 (56 Geo. 3. c. xviii))
Saint Catherine Coleman Act 1738 (repealed)	12 Geo. 2. c. 17	14 June 1739
An Act to enable the Parishioners of the Parish of Saint Catherine Coleman, in Fenchurch Street, in the City of London, to re-build the Church of the said Parish. (Repealed by Statute Law (Repeals) Act 2013 (c. 2))
Warwick Roads Act 1738 (repealed)	12 Geo. 2. c. 18	14 June 1739
An Act for repairing the Road, or Highway, from The Dun Cow, (Note: The Dun Cow is located at the junction of the B4429 and the A426 in Dunchurch, Warwickshire. 52°20′14″N 1°17′23″W) in the Town of Dunchurch, through the Parish of Bilton, over Dunsmore Heath, to the Town of Hill Morton, in the County of Warwick; and from thence, through the several Parishes of Creek, West Haddon, and East Haddon, in the County of Northampton, to Saint James's End, in the Parish of Duston, in the said County of Northampton. (Repealed by Warwick and Northampton Roads Act 1781 (21 Geo. 3. c. 106))
Supply, etc. Act 1738 (repealed)	12 Geo. 2. c. 19	14 June 1739
An Act for granting to His Majesty the Sum of Five Hundred Thousand Pounds, out of the Sinking Fund, for the Service of the Year One Thousand Seven Hundred and Thirty-nine; and for enabling His Majesty to raise the further Sum of Five Hundred Thousand Pounds, out of the growing Produce of the said Fund; and for the further appropriating the Supplies granted in this Session of Parliament; and for giving Time for the Payment of Duties omitted to be paid for the Indentures and Contracts of Clerks and Apprentices. (Repealed by Statute Law Revision Act 1867 (30 & 31 Vict. c. 59))
Bath Roads, Streets, etc. Act 1738 (repealed)	12 Geo. 2. c. 20	14 June 1739
An Act for enlarging the Term and Powers granted by Two Acts of Parliament, one made in the Sixth Year of the Reign of Her late Majesty Queen Anne, (Note: Bath Highway, Streets, etc. Act 1707 (6 Ann. c. 42)) and the other in the Seventh Year of the Reign of His late Majesty King George the First, (Note: Bath Highways, Streets, etc. Act 1720 (7 Geo. 1. St. 1. c. 19)) for repairing and enlarging the Highways, between the Top of Kingsdown Hill (Note: Kingsdown Hill is adjacent to Kingsdown in Somerset. 51°24′10″N 2°16′12″W) and the City of Bath; and for amending several other Highways leading to the said City; and for cleansing, paving, and enlightening the Streets, and regulating the Chairmen there; and for keeping a regular Nightly Watch within the said City and Liberties thereof. (Repealed by Bath (Streets, Buildings, Watch, etc.) Act 1757 (30 Geo. 2. c. 65) and Bath Roads Act 1793 (33 Geo. 3. c. 144))
Wool Act 1738 (repealed)	12 Geo. 2. c. 21	14 June 1739
An Act for taking off the Duties upon Woollen and Bay Yarn imported from Ireland to England; and for the more effectual preventing the Exportation of Wool from Great Britain, and of Wool and Wool manufactured from Ireland to Foreign Parts. (Repealed by Statute Law Revision Act 1867 (30 & 31 Vict. c. 59))
Frauds in the Public Revenues, etc. Act 1738 (repealed)	12 Geo. 2. c. 22	14 June 1739
An Act to rectify a Mistake in an Act made in the Sixth Year of the Reign of His late Majesty King George, (Note: Excise Act 1719 (6 Geo. 1. c. 21)) for preventing Frauds and Abuses in the Public Revenues of Excise, Customs, Stamp Duties, Post-office, and House-money, relating to the Condition of Bonds taken from Masters of Ships; and to indemnify Persons who have acted under the said Mistake; and also to obviate a Doubt which has arisen, upon an Act made in the Seventh Year of His said late Majesty's Reign, for the further preventing His Majesty's Subjects from trading to The East Indies under Foreign Commissions; and for encouraging and further securing the lawful Trade thereto; with regard to Prosecutions in Ireland, in a summary Way, for the fraudulent Importation of East India Goods into that Kingdom. (Repealed by Statute Law Revision Act 1867 (30 & 31 Vict. c. 59))
Joanna Stephens' Reward (Cure for Stone) Act 1738 (repealed)	12 Geo. 2. c. 23	14 June 1739
An Act for providing a Reward to Joanna Stephens, upon a proper Discovery to be made by her, for the Use of the Public, of the Medicines prepared by her for the Cure of the Stone. (Repealed by Statute Law Revision Act 1948 (11 & 12 Geo. 6. c. 62))
Court of Chancery Act 1738 (repealed)	12 Geo. 2. c. 24	14 June 1739
An Act to empower the High Court of Chancery to lay out, upon proper Securities, any Monies, not exceeding a Sum therein limited, out of the common and general Cash in the Bank of England, belonging to the Suitors of the said Court, for the Ease of the said Suitors, by applying the Interest arising therefrom for answering the Charges of the Office of the Accomptant General of the said Court. (Repealed by Courts of Justice (Salaries and Funds) Act 1869 (32 & 33 Vict. c. 91))
Curriers, etc. Act 1738 (repealed)	12 Geo. 2. c. 25	14 June 1739
An Act to obviate some Doubts which have arisen, upon the construction of an Act, made in the First Year of the Reign of King William and Queen Mary, (Note: Leather Act 1688 (1 Will. & Mar. c. 33)) intituled, "An Act for explaining Part of an Act made in the First Year of the Reign of King James the First, (Note: Leather Act 1603 (1 Jas. 1. c. 22)) concerning Tanned Leather;" and for rendering more effectual a Clause in the said last mentioned Act, which obliges Curriers to curry Leather; and for repealing Two Clauses in the said last mentioned Act. (Repealed by Statute Law Revision Act 1867 (30 & 31 Vict. c. 59))
Plate (Offences) Act 1738 (repealed)	12 Geo. 2. c. 26	14 June 1739
An Act for the better preventing Frauds and Abuses in Gold and Silver Wares. (Repealed by Hallmarking Act 1973 (c. 43))
Justices of Assize Act 1738 (repealed)	12 Geo. 2. c. 27	14 June 1739
An Act for explaining and amending an Act, made in the Eighth Year of the Reign of King Richard the Second, intituled, "No Man of Law shall be Justice of Assize or Gaol Delivery in his own Country;" (Note: Justices of Assize, etc. Act 1384 (8 Ric. 2. c. 2)) and another Act, made in the Thirty-third Year of the Reign of King Henry the Eighth, intituled, "An Act that none shall be Justice of Assize in his own Country, &c." (Note: Justices of Assize, etc. Act 1541 (33 Hen. 8. c. 24)) (Repealed by Statute Law Revision and Civil Procedure Act 1881 (44 & 45 Vict. c. 59))
Gaming Act 1738 (repealed)	12 Geo. 2. c. 28	14 June 1739
An Act for the more effectual preventing of excessive and deceitful Gaming. (Repealed by Gambling Act 2005 (c. 19))
County Rates Act 1738 or the County Rate Act 1739 (repealed)	12 Geo. 2. c. 29	14 June 1739
An Act for the more easy assessing, collecting, and levying, of County Rates. (Repealed by Middlesex County Rates Act 1831 (1 & 2 Will. 4. c. xlviii), Highways Act 1959 (7 & 8 Eliz. 2. c. 25) and London Government Act 1963 (c. 33))
Colonial Trade Act 1738 (repealed)	12 Geo. 2. c. 30	14 June 1739
An Act for granting a Liberty to carry Sugars, of the Growth, Produce, or Manufacture, of any of His Majesty's Sugar Colonies in America, from the said Colonies directly to Foreign Parts, in Ships built in Great Britain, and navigated according to Law. (Repealed by Prize Act 1794 (34 Geo. 3. c. 42))
Bath Hospital Act 1738	12 Geo. 2. c. 31	14 June 1739
An Act for establishing and well-governing an Hospital, or Infirmary, in the City of Bath.
River Lee Navigation Act 1738 or the Lee Navigation Improvement Act 1738	12 Geo. 2. c. 32	14 June 1739
An Act for ascertaining, preserving, and improving, the Navigation of the River Lee, from the Town of Hertford, to the Town of Ware, in the County of Hertford; and for preserving and improving the said River, from the said Town of Ware, to the new Cut, or River, made by the Mayor, Commonalty, and Citizens of London; and for enabling the Governor and Company of The New River the better to supply the Cities of London and Westminster, and the Liberties and Suburbs thereof, with good and wholesome Water.
Westminster Bridge Act 1738 (repealed)	12 Geo. 2. c. 33	14 June 1739
An Act to enlarge the Powers of the Commissioners for building a Bridge cross the River Thames, from The Woolstaple, or thereabouts, in the Parish of Saint Margaret, in the City of Westminster, to the opposite Shore, in the County of Surrey; and to enable them, by a Lottery, to raise Money, for the several Purposes therein mentioned; and to enlarge the Time for exchanging Tickets unclaimed in the last Lottery for the said Bridge; and to make Provision for Tickets in the said Lottery, lost, burnt, or otherwise destroyed. (Repealed by Westminster Bridge Act 1853 (16 & 17 Vict. c. 46))
Lincoln and Nottinghamshire Roads Act 1738 (repealed)	12 Geo. 2. c. 34	14 June 1739
An Act for enlarging the Term and Powers granted by an Act passed in the Twelfth Year of the Reign of His late Majesty King George the First, (Note: Foston Bridge and Witham Common Road Act 1725 (12 Geo. 1. c. 16)) for repairing the Road from Spittlegate Hill, near Grantham, in the County of Lincoln, to Little Drayton, in the County of Nottingham. (Repealed by Foston Bridge and Little Drayton Road Act 1799 (39 Geo. 3 c. xxvi) and Road from Foston Bridge (Lincolnshire) Act 1808 (48 Geo. 3. c. lxiii))
Northamptonshire Roads Act 1738 (repealed)	12 Geo. 2. c. 35	14 June 1739
An Act for enlarging the Term and Powers granted by an Act passed in the Eighth Year of the Reign of His late Majesty King George the First, (Note: Nottingham and Leicester Highways Act 1721 (8 Geo. 1. c. 13)) for amending the Highways leading from Brampton Bridge to Welford Bridge, in the County of Northampton; and also the great Post Road from Morter-Pitt Hill, in the said County, through Brixworth, Lamport, Maidwell, Kelmarsh, and Oxenden-Magna, to Chain Bridge, leading into Market Harborough, in the County of Leicester. (Repealed by Northampton Roads Act 1778 (18 Geo. 3. c 112))
Importation Act 1738 (repealed)	12 Geo. 2. c. 36	14 June 1739
An Act for prohibiting the Importation of Books re-printed Abroad, and first composed, or written, and printed, in Great Britain; and for repealing so much of an Act, made in the Eighth Year of the Reign of Her late Majesty Queen Anne, (Note: Copyright Act 1709 (8 Ann. c. 21)) as empowers the limiting the Prices of Books. (Repealed by Statute Law Revision Act 1867 (30 & 31 Vict. c. 59) (Note: Incorrectly cited as "Statute Law Revision Act 1967" in the Chronological Table of the Statutes.))

=== Private acts ===
Short title	Citation	Royal assent
Long title
Naturalization of Murison, Voogd, Cley and Others Act 1738	12 Geo. 2. c. 1 Pr.	15 March 1739
An Act for naturalizing Jacob Hoffham Murison, Nathaniel Voogd, Samuel Cley, and others.
Naturalization of James Nadal, William Morin and Charles Delon Act 1738	12 Geo. 2. c. 2 Pr.	15 March 1739
An Act for naturalizing James Nadal, William Rene Morin, and Charles Delon.
Berney's Estate Act 1738	12 Geo. 2. c. 3 Pr.	19 April 1739
An Act for Sale of Part of the Estate late of Richard Berney Esquire, deceased, for discharging Encumbrances thereupon.
Townshend's Estate Act 1738	12 Geo. 2. c. 4 Pr.	19 April 1739
An Act for vesting a Messuage and Lands, in Twickenham, late the Estate of the Honourable William Townshend Esquire, deceased, in Trustees, in Trust, to sell the same, pursuant to an Article entered into by the said William Townshend in his Life-time; and for applying the Money arising by such Sale for the Benefit of Charles Townshend, his only Son and Heir, an Infant.
Vesting in Lord Archibald Hamilton and his heirs lands, tenements and hereditaments in Berkshire, in trust, to convey them to Sir William Irby, and laying out purchase money for lands, tenements and hereditaments to be settled on certain trusts.	12 Geo. 2. c. 5 Pr.	19 April 1739
An Act for vesting in Archibald Hamilton Esquire, commonly called Lord Archibald Hamilton, and his Heirs, the Lands, Tenements, and Hereditaments, in the County of Berks, therein mentioned, in Trust, to convey the same to Sir William Irby Baronet, and his Heirs; and for laying out the Purchase-money in the Purchase of Lands, Tenements, and Hereditaments, to be settled to the Uses, and upon the Trusts, therein mentioned.
Sherwin's Estate Act 1738	12 Geo. 2. c. 6 Pr.	19 April 1739
An Act for discharging the Estate of John Sherwin Esquire, in the County of Hertford, from the Uses, Trusts, and Covenants, in his Marriage Settlement; and for settling an Estate, in the County of Nottingham, and Town and County of the Town of Nottingham, of greater Value, in Lieu thereof, to the like Uses.
Mackenzie's Estate Act 1738	12 Geo. 2. c. 7 Pr.	19 April 1739
An Act to enable Sir James McKenzie, of Royston, to sell Lands and Hereditaments, in the Sheriffdom of Edinburgh, for Payment of Debts and Encumbrances charged upon and affecting the same.
Brooksbank's Estate Act 1738	12 Geo. 2. c. 8 Pr.	19 April 1739
An Act for vesting the settled Estate of Stamp Brooksbank Esquire, in the Counties of Suffolk and Cambridge, in him and his Heirs; and for settling the Manor of Helaugh, and divers Lands and Hereditaments in Helaugh, in the County of the City of York, of greater Value, in Lieu thereof.
Worth's Estate Act 1738	12 Geo. 2. c. 9 Pr.	19 April 1739
An Act for selling and disposing of Part of the Estate of John Worth Esquire, a Lunatic, for discharging the Debts, Portions, and Encumbrances, charged upon and affecting the same.
Hunmanby Inclosure Act 1738	12 Geo. 2. c. 10 Pr.	19 April 1739
An Act for confirming certain Articles of Agreement, between the Lord of the Manor of Hunmanby and the Vicar and Freeholders of Hunmanby, in the County of York, for enclosing Part of the Moor in Hunmanby aforesaid.
Mould's Name Act 1738	12 Geo. 2. c. 11 Pr.	19 April 1739
An Act to enable John Mould Esquire, and his Issue Male, to take and use the Surname and Arms of Moore, pursuant to the Will of John Moore Esquire, deceased.
Crouch's Name Act 1738	12 Geo. 2. c. 12 Pr.	19 April 1739
An Act to enable John Crouch Esquire, Eldest Son of Pyke Crouch Esquire, deceased, and the Heirs Male of his Body, to take and use the Surname of Pyke, pursuant to the Will of John Pyke Esquire, deceased.
Gregory's Name Act 1738	12 Geo. 2. c. 13 Pr.	19 April 1739
An Act to enable Charles Gregory Esquire, now called Charles Gregory Wade, and his Issue Male, to use the Surname of Wade.
Brewer's Name Act 1738	12 Geo. 2. c. 14 Pr.	19 April 1739
An Act to enable Risley Brewer and his Heirs to take and use the Surname and Arms of Risley, pursuant to the Will of Paul Risley Esquire, deceased.
Naturalization of Tracy, Reyhlen, Nieman and Hubert Act 1738	12 Geo. 2. c. 15 Pr.	19 April 1739
An Act for naturalizing James Tracy, Christian Burckhard, Reyhlen Zacharias Nieman, and Susanna Hubert.
Duke of Norfolk's Estate Act 1738	12 Geo. 2. c. 16 Pr.	14 June 1739
An Act to enable Edward Duke of Norfolk to grant Building Leases, for Ninety-nine Years, of all or any Part of his Lands, in or near the Township of Sheffield, in the County of York.
Confirming and establishing an exchange between Thomas Duke of Newcastle and Sir Miles Stapleton of their estates in Yorkshire.	12 Geo. 2. c. 17 Pr.	14 June 1739
An Act for confirming and establishing an Exchange agreed to be made, between Thomas Holles Duke of Newcastle and Sir Miles Stapylton Baronet, of their settled Estates in the County of York; and for settling the Lands given in Exchange to each Party to such Uses as the Lands for which the same were exchanged stood settled.
Duke of Portland's Estate Act 1738	12 Geo. 2. c. 18 Pr.	14 June 1739
An Act to enable the most Noble William Duke of Portland to grant Building Leases of certain Messuages, Pieces, and Parcels of Ground, in Soho Fields, in the County of Middlesex, for a further Term than he is empowered to grant by his Marriage Settlement.
Earl of Chesterfield's Estate Act 1738	12 Geo. 2. c. 19 Pr.	14 June 1739
An Act for discharging several Lands in Noseley, in the County of Leicester, purchased by the Executors of Philip Earl of Chesterfield, deceased, from the Uses and Limitations contained in the Will of the said Earl; and for vesting the same Lands in Trustees, to be sold; and, with the Money arising thereby, to purchase other Lands, to be settled to the same Uses.
Earl Cowper's Estate Act 1738	12 Geo. 2. c. 20 Pr.	14 June 1739
An Act for discharging Part of the settled Estate of William Earl Cowper, in the County of Hertford, from the Uses and Limitations of a former Settlement; and for settling and securing an Equivalent for the same, to the like Uses.
Earl of Inchiquin's Estate Act 1738	12 Geo. 2. c. 21 Pr.	14 June 1739
An Act for Sale of Part of the Estate of William Earl of Inchiquin, in the Kingdom of Ireland, for Payment of the Debts and Encumbrances charged thereupon; and for settling such Part thereof as shall remain unsold, according to his Marriage Agreement.
Confirming, establishing and rendering effectual an agreement between Sir William Courtnay and his brother, Henry Reginald Courtnay.	12 Geo. 2. c. 22 Pr.	14 June 1739
An Act to establish and confirm an Agreement made between Sir William Courtenay Baronet, and his Brother Henry Reginald Courtenay Esquire; and to render the same effectual, for the several Uses and Purposes therein mentioned.
Establishing Dame Elizabeth Dashwood's jointure, and other provisions.	12 Geo. 2. c. 23 Pr.	14 June 1739
An Act to establish a Jointure on Dame Elizabeth Dashwood, Wife of Sir James Dashwood Baronet; and for other Purposes therein mentioned.
Exchange of lands in Wroughton and Liddyard Treagooze (Wiltshire) between governors of Charterhouse hospital and Thomas Benet.	12 Geo. 2. c. 24 Pr.	14 June 1739
An Act for the Exchange of certain Lands, in the several Parishes of Wroughton and Liddyard Treagooze, in the County of Wilts, between the Governors of the Hospital commonly called The Charter-house, and Thomas Benet, of Salthrop, in the said County of Wilts, Esquire.
Edward Warren's Estate Act 1738	12 Geo. 2. c. 25 Pr.	14 June 1739
An Act to enable the acting Executors and Testamentary Guardians named in the Will of Edward Warren, late of Pointon, in the County of Chester, Esquire, deceased, by selling Part, and leasing other Parts, of his settled Estate, to raise Money, for discharging the Encumbrances thereon; and to provide a sufficient Maintenance for his Son, during his Minority, in Ease of an Estate directed to be sold by the Will of John Warren Esquire, deceased.
Confirming articles of agreement between Edward Westall, his wife, Robert Corr and others and enabling Robert Corr to contract for sale of lands mentioned.	12 Geo. 2. c. 26 Pr.	14 June 1739
An Act for confirming certain Articles of Agreement, made between Edward Westall and his Wife, and Robert Corr an Infant, and others; and to enable the said Robert Corr to perform a Contract, for Sale of certain Lands therein mentioned.
Langdale's Estate Act 1738	12 Geo. 2. c. 27 Pr.	14 June 1739
An Act for Sale of Part of the Estate of Jordan Langdale Esquire, in the County of York, for Payment of Debts and Encumbrances affecting the same.
Lear's Estate Act 1738	12 Geo. 2. c. 28 Pr.	14 June 1739
An Act for Sale of Part of the Estate late of Sir John Lear Baronet, deceased, in the County of Devon, for Payment of his Debts; and for other Purposes therein mentioned.
Fownes' Estate Act 1738	12 Geo. 2. c. 29 Pr.	14 June 1739
An Act for vesting divers Lands and Hereditaments, in the County of Somerset, being Part of the settled Estate of Thomas Fownes Esquire, in Trust, to be sold; and for settling other Lands, in the County of Devon, of greater Value, to the same Uses, in Lieu thereof.
Pailton Inclosure Act 1738	12 Geo. 2. c. 30 Pr.	14 June 1739
An Act for enclosing Part of certain Common Fields, in the Township of Pailton, in the County of Warwick.
Odiham Inclosure Act 1738	12 Geo. 2. c. 31 Pr.	14 June 1739
An Act for enclosing Part of a Common, or Waste Grounds, called Hill-side, otherwise Lambden Common, in the Manor and Parish of Odiham, and County of Southampton.
Shipton Moyne and Dovel Inclosure Act 1738	12 Geo. 2. c. 32 Pr.	14 June 1739
An Act for dividing and enclosing the Common Fields, lying in the Manor of Shipton Moyne, within the Parish of Shipton Moyne and Dovel, in the County of Glocester, commonly called The North and South Common Fields.
Bell's Name Act 1738	12 Geo. 2. c. 33 Pr.	14 June 1739
An Act to enable John Bell Esquire and his Issue to take and use the Surname of Lane, and the Arms of James Lord Viscount Lanesborough, deceased, pursuant to his Will.
Ducarel's Naturalization Act 1738	12 Geo. 2. c. 34 Pr.	14 June 1739
An Act for naturalizing Adrian Colteé Ducarel.
Deshons' Naturalization Act 1738	12 Geo. 2. c. 35 Pr.	14 June 1739
An Act for naturalizing John Deshons.

=== Sources ===
- Pickering, Danby, ed. (1765). The Statutes at Large. Vol. 17: From the Ninth to the 15th Year of King George II – via Internet Archive.
- Pickering, Danby, ed. (1765). The Statutes at Large. Vol. 17: From the Ninth to the 15th Year of King George II – via Google Books.
- Journals of the House of Commons. Vol. 23. London: His Majesty's Stationery Office. 1803. pp. 206–381 – via Google Books.
- Chronological Table of and Index to the Statutes. Vol. 1: To the End of the Session 59 Vict. Sess. 2 (1895) (13th ed.). London: Her Majesty's Stationery Office. 1896. p. 105 – via Google Books.
- "Acts of the Parliament of Great Britain from 1738". legislation.gov.uk. The National Archives.

== See also ==
- List of acts of the Parliament of Great Britain
