= List of acts of the Parliament of Great Britain from 1737 =

This is a complete list of acts of the Parliament of Great Britain for the year 1737.

For acts passed until 1707, see the list of acts of the Parliament of England and the list of acts of the Parliament of Scotland. See also the list of acts of the Parliament of Ireland.

For acts passed from 1801 onwards, see the list of acts of the Parliament of the United Kingdom. For acts of the devolved parliaments and assemblies in the United Kingdom, see the list of acts of the Scottish Parliament, the list of acts of the Northern Ireland Assembly, and the list of acts and measures of Senedd Cymru; see also the list of acts of the Parliament of Northern Ireland.

The number shown after each act's title is its chapter number. Acts are cited using this number, preceded by the year(s) of the reign during which the relevant parliamentary session was held; thus the Union with Ireland Act 1800 is cited as "39 & 40 Geo. 3. c. 67", meaning the 67th act passed during the session that started in the 39th year of the reign of George III and which finished in the 40th year of that reign. Note that the modern convention is to use Arabic numerals in citations (thus "41 Geo. 3" rather than "41 Geo. III"). Acts of the last session of the Parliament of Great Britain and the first session of the Parliament of the United Kingdom are both cited as "41 Geo. 3".

Acts passed by the Parliament of Great Britain did not have a short title; however, some of these acts have subsequently been given a short title by acts of the Parliament of the United Kingdom (such as the Short Titles Act 1896).

Before the Acts of Parliament (Commencement) Act 1793 came into force on 8 April 1793, acts passed by the Parliament of Great Britain were deemed to have come into effect on the first day of the session in which they were passed. Because of this, the years given in the list below may in fact be the year before a particular act was passed.

== 11 Geo. 2 ==
The fourth session of the 8th Parliament of Great Britain, which met from 24 January 1738 until 20 May 1738.

This session was also traditionally cited as 11 G. 2.

=== Public acts ===
Short title	Citation	Royal assent
Long title
Taxation Act 1737 (repealed)	11 Geo. 2. c. 1	7 March 1738
An Act for continuing the Duties upon Malt, Mum, Cyder, and Perry, in that Part of Great Britain called England; and for granting to His Majesty certain Duties upon Malt, Mum, Cyder, and Perry, in that Part of Great Britain called Scotland; for the Service of the Year One Thousand Seven Hundred and Thirty-eight. (Repealed by Statute Law Revision Act 1867 (30 & 31 Vict. c. 59))
Mutiny Act 1737 (repealed)	11 Geo. 2. c. 2	21 March 1738
An Act for punishing Mutiny and Desertion; and for the better Payment of the Army and their Quarters. (Repealed by Statute Law Revision Act 1867 (30 & 31 Vict. c. 59))
Nottinghamshire and Leicester Roads Act 1737 (repealed)	11 Geo. 2. c. 3	21 March 1738
An Act for repairing the Road leading from the Trent Bridge, (Note: Trent Bridge in Nottingham. 52°56′18″N 1°08′11″W) in the County of the Town of Nottingham (through Costock otherwise Cortlingstock Lane) (Note: Costock in Nottinghamshire. 52°49′55″N 1°08′43″W) to the Bridges commonly known by the Name of Cotes Bridges, (Note: Cotes Bridge takes the A60 across the River Soar near Cotes in Leicestershire. 52°46′49″N 1°10′49″W) in the County of Leicester. (Repealed by Trent Bridge to Cotes Bridge Road Act 1780 (20 Geo. 3. c. 87))
Aberbrothock Beer Duties Act 1737 (repealed)	11 Geo. 2. c. 4	21 March 1738
An Act for laying a Duty of Two Pennies Scots, or One Sixth Part of a Penny Sterling, upon every Scots Pint of Ale and Beer which shall be brewed for Sale, brought into, vended, tapped, or sold, within the Town of Aberbrothock, and Liberties thereof. (Repealed by Statute Law Revision Act 1948 (11 & 12 Geo. 6. c. 62))
Church of All Saints Worcester Act 1737 (repealed)	11 Geo. 2. c. 5	20 May 1738
An Act for taking down and re-building the Church of the Parish of All Saints, in the City of Worcester. (Repealed by Statute Law (Repeals) Act 1998 (c. 43))
Middlesex Roads Act 1737 (repealed)	11 Geo. 2. c. 6	20 May 1738
An Act for enlarging the Term and Powers granted by Two Acts of Parliament, One of the Third, (Note: Kensington, Staines and Cranford Bridge Roads Act 1716 (3 Geo. 1. c. 14 Pr.)) and the other of the Tenth, (Note: Middlesex Highways Act 1723 (10 Geo. 1. c. 6)) Year of the Reign of His late Majesty King George the First, for repairing the Highways from that Part of Counters Bridge which lies in the Parish of Kensington, in the County of Middlesex (leading through the Towns of Brentford and Hounslow), to the Powder Mills, in the Road to Staines, and to Cranford Bridge, in the said County, in the Road to Colnbrooke. (Repealed by Middlesex Roads Act 1766 (7 Geo. 3. c. 88) and Metropolis Roads Act 1826 (7 Geo. 4. c. cxlii))
Dover Harbour Act 1737 (repealed)	11 Geo. 2. c. 7	20 May 1738
An Act for continuing the Term and Powers granted and given by the Acts passed in the Eleventh and Twelfth Year of the Reign of King William the Third, (Note: Dover Harbour Act 1698 (11 Will. 3. c. 5)) and in the Ninth (Note: Dover Harbour Act 1722 (9 Geo. 1. c. 30)) and Tenth (Note: Rye Harbour Act 1723 (10 Geo. 1. c. 7)) Years of the Reign of His late Majesty King George, for repairing the Harbour of Dover, in the County of Kent; and for restoring the Harbour of Rye, in the County of Sussex, to its ancient Goodness. (Repealed by Rye Harbour Act 1797 (37 Geo. 3. c. 130) and Dover Harbour Act 1828 (9 Geo. 4. c. xxxi))
Minehead Harbour Act 1737 (repealed)	11 Geo. 2. c. 8	20 May 1738
An Act for continuing the Terms and Powers granted and given by the Acts passed in the Twelfth and Thirteenth Year of the Reign of His late Majesty King William, (Note: Minehead Harbour Act 1700 (12 & 13 Will. 3. c. 9)) and the Tenth Year of Her late Majesty Queen Anne, (Note: Minehead Harbour Act 1711 (10 Ann. c. 32)) for recovering, securing, and keeping in Repair, the Harbour of Minehead, in the County of Somerset. (Repealed by Minehead Pier and Harbour Act 1823 (4 Geo. 4. c. cxiii))
Insolvent Debtors Relief Act 1737 (repealed)	11 Geo. 2. c. 9	20 May 1738
An Act for Relief of such Prisoners for Debt, as have by unavoidable Accidents lost the Benefit of an Act, passed in the last Session of Parliament, intituled, "An Act for Relief of Insolvent Debtors;" (Note: Insolvent Debtors Relief Act 1736 (10 Geo. 2. c. 26)) and for the Indemnity of such Sheriffs and Gaolers as have incurred any Penalties on account of such Prisoners not being discharged; and for extending the Benefit of the said Act to Creditors, whose Debtors were committed to Prison since the First Day of January One Thousand Seven Hundred and Thirty, and were detained there upon the First Day of January One Thousand Seven Hundred and Thirty-six, and have chose to continue there. (Repealed by Statute Law Revision Act 1867 (30 & 31 Vict. c. 59))
Hertfordshire Roads Act 1737 (repealed)	11 Geo. 2. c. 10	20 May 1738
An Act for enlarging the Term and Powers granted and given by an Act passed in the Twelfth Year of the Reign of His late Majesty King George, (Note: Hertfordshire Roads Act 1725 (12 Geo. 1. c. 10)) for repairing the Road from Lemsford Mill, in the County of Hertford, to Welwyn, and from thence to Gory's Mill, and from Welwyn (through Codicot) to Hitchin, in the said County; and also for repairing the Roads from Cory's Mill to Hitchin aforesaid. (Repealed by Bishop's Hatfield and Hitchin, and Welwyn and Hitchin Roads Act 1831 (1 Will. 4 c. xxxvi))
Papists Act 1737 (repealed)	11 Geo. 2. c. 11	20 May 1738
An Act for allowing further Time for Enrolment of Deeds and Wills made by Papists; and for Relief of Protestant Purchasers, Devisees, and Lessees. (Repealed by Statute Law Revision Act 1867 (30 & 31 Vict. c. 59))
River Thames (Lastage and Ballastage) Act 1737 (repealed)	11 Geo. 2. c. 12	20 May 1738
An Act for continuing of an Act made in the Sixth Year of the Reign of His present Majesty, intituled, "An Act for the better Regulation of Lastage and Ballastage in the River Thames." (Note: River Thames (Lastage and Ballastage) Act 1732 (6 Geo. 2. c. 29)) (Repealed by Thames Lastage and Ballastage Act 1805 (45 Geo. 3. c. xcviii))
Rotherhithe Church Act 1737	11 Geo. 2. c. 13	20 May 1738
An Act to enlarge the Term and Powers granted by an Act of Parliament made and passed in the Third Year of the Reign of His late Majesty King George, intituled, "An Act to enable the Parishioners of the Parish of Saint Mary, Rotherhith, in the County of Surrey, by certain Funeral Rates therein mentioned, to finish the said Parish Church;" (Note: St. Mary Rotherhithe Act 1716 (3 Geo. 1. c. 5 Pr.)) and to enable the said Parishioners to raise such further Sums of Money as shall be necessary for purchasing a convenient Piece of Ground, for an additional Burial Ground; and for other Purposes therein mentioned.
Land Tax Act 1737 (repealed)	11 Geo. 2. c. 14	20 May 1738
An Act for granting an Aid to His Majesty, by a Land Tax to be raised in Great Britain, for the Service of the Year One Thousand Seven Hundred and Thirty-eight. (Repealed by Statute Law Revision Act 1867 (30 & 31 Vict. c. 59))
Sale of Coal (London and Newcastle) Act 1737 (repealed)	11 Geo. 2. c. 15	20 May 1738
An Act to empower the Court of Lord Mayor and Aldermen of the City of London to set the Price upon all Coals, commonly called Sea Coals, imported into the Port of London, from Newcastle, and the Ports adjacent thereunto, for the Space of One Year; and to oblige, for the Term therein mentioned, Fitters and others vending and loading Ships with Sea Coals at Newcastle, and the Ports adjacent thereunto, to deliver such Coals to any Masters of Ships applying for the same; and for further obliging Buyers and Sellers of Sea Coals at Billingsgate, or other Place of Sale within the Bills of Mortality, to sign their Contracts for Coals; and for the Admeasurement of all Carriages whatsoever, used in loading Ships with Coals in the Port of Newcastle, and Members thereunto belonging. (Repealed by London, Westminster, Middlesex, Surrey, Kent and Essex Coal Trade Act 1807 (47 Geo. 3. Sess. 2. c. lxviii) and Statute Law Revision Act 1948 (11 & 12 Geo. 6. c. 62))
Inverness Beer Duties Act 1737 (repealed)	11 Geo. 2. c. 16	20 May 1738
An Act for continuing the Duty of Two Pennies Scots, or One Sixth Part of a Penny Sterling, on each Pint of Ale and Beer that shall be vended or sold within the Town of Inverness and Privileges thereof, for paying the Debts of the said Town; and other Purposes therein mentioned. (Repealed by Statute Law Revision Act 1948 (11 & 12 Geo. 6. c. 62))
Church Patronage Act 1737 (repealed)	11 Geo. 2. c. 17	20 May 1738
An Act for securing the Estates of Papists, conforming to the Protestant Religion, against the Disabilities created by several Acts of Parliament relating to Papists; and for rendering more effectual the several Acts of Parliament made for vesting in the Two Universities, in that Part of Great Britain called England, the Presentations of Benefices belonging to Papists. (Repealed by Patronage (Benefices) Measure 1986 (No. 3))
Continuance of Laws Act 1737 (repealed)	11 Geo. 2. c. 18	20 May 1738
An Act to continue Two several Acts therein mentioned; one, (Note: Growth of Coffee Act 1731 (5 Geo. 2. c. 24)) for encouraging the Growth of Coffee in His Majesty's Plantations in America; and the other, (Note: Trade of Sugar Colonies Act 1732 (6 Geo. 2. c. 13)) for the better securing and encouraging the Trade of His Majesty's Sugar Colonies in America. (Repealed by Statute Law Revision Act 1867 (30 & 31 Vict. c. 59))
Distress for Rent Act 1737	11 Geo. 2. c. 19	20 May 1738
An Act for the more effectual securing the Payment of Rents, and preventing Frauds by Tenants.
Poor Prisoners Relief Act 1737 (repealed)	11 Geo. 2. c. 20	20 May 1738
An Act for the more effectual securing the Payments of certain Sums of Money, directed, by an Act made in the Forty-third Year of the Reign of Queen Elizabeth, intituled, "An Act for Relief of the Poor," (Note: Poor Relief Act 1601 (43 Eliz. 1. c. 2)) to be paid by the respective Treasurers of every County in England and Wales, for the Relief of the poor Prisoners of The King's Bench and Marshalsea Prisons. (Repealed by Poor Prisoners Relief Act 1813 (53 Geo. 3. c. 113))
Christ Church Southwark Act 1737 (repealed)	11 Geo. 2. c. 21	20 May 1738
An Act to empower the present Trustees under the last Will and Testament of John Marshall Gentleman, deceased, to lay out a certain Sum of Money now in their Hands, for pulling down and re-building the Parish Church of Christ Church, in the County of Surrey; and for enclosing a Piece of Ground, lately purchased, for an additional Church Yard to the said Church. (Repealed by Christchurch, Middlesex Act 1772 (12 Geo. 3. c. 38))
Corn Exportation Act 1737 (repealed)	11 Geo. 2. c. 22	20 May 1738
An Act for punishing such Persons as shall do Injuries and Violences to the Persons or Properties of His Majesty's Subjects, with Intent to hinder the Exportation of Corn. (Repealed by Criminal Statutes Repeal Act 1827 (7 & 8 Geo. 4. c. 27), Offences Against the Person Act 1828 (9 Geo. 4. c. 31), Criminal Statutes (Ireland) Repeal Act 1828 (9 Geo. 4. c. 53), Criminal Law (India) Act 1828 (9 Geo. 4. c. 74), Statute Law Revision Act 1867 (30 & 31 Vict. c. 59) and Statute Law Revision Act 1948 (11 & 12 Geo. 6. c. 62))
Saint Leonards, Shoreditch Act 1737	11 Geo. 2. c. 23	20 May 1738
An Act to explain and amend an Act passed in the Eighth Year of His present Majesty's Reign, intituled, "An Act for re-building the Parish Church of Saint Leonard Shoreditch, in the County of Middlesex." (Note: Church of Saint Leonard, Shoreditch Act 1734 (8 Geo. 2. c. 27))
Parliamentary Privilege Act 1737	11 Geo. 2. c. 24	20 May 1738
An Act to amend an Act passed in the Twelfth and Thirteenth Year of the Reign of King William the Third, intituled "An Act for preventing any Inconveniences that may happen by Privilege of Parliament." (Note: Privilege of Parliament Act 1700 (12 & 13 Will. 3. c. 3))
Westminster Bridge Act 1737 (repealed)	11 Geo. 2. c. 25	20 May 1738
An Act for building a Bridge cross the River Thames, from the Woolstaple, or thereabouts, in the Parish of Saint Margaret, in the City of Westminster, to the opposite Shore, in the County of Surrey. (Repealed by Westminster Bridge Act 1853 (16 & 17 Vict. c. 46))
Retailers of Spirits Act 1737 (repealed)	11 Geo. 2. c. 26	20 May 1738
An Act for enforcing the Execution of an Act, made in the Ninth Year of His present Majesty's Reign, intituled, "An Act for laying a Duty upon the Retailers of Spirituous Liquors, and for licensing the Retailers thereof." (Note: Spirit Duties Act 1735 (9 Geo. 2. c. 23)) (Repealed by Statute Law Revision Act 1867 (30 & 31 Vict. c. 59))
National Debt Act 1737 (repealed)	11 Geo. 2. c. 27	20 May 1738
An Act for granting to His Majesty the Sum of Two Millions, for the Service of the Year One Thousand Seven Hundred and Thirty-eight; and for paying to the Governor and Company of the Bank of England One Million, for redeeming an Annuity of Forty Thousand Pounds payable to them; and for the further appropriating the Supplies granted in this Session of Parliament. (Repealed by Statute Law Revision Act 1870 (33 & 34 Vict. c. 69))
Cloth Manufacture Act 1737 (repealed)	11 Geo. 2. c. 28	20 May 1738
An Act for the better regulating the Manufacture of Narrow Woollen Cloths, in the West Riding of the County of York. (Repealed by Repeal of Obsolete Statutes Act 1856 (19 & 20 Vict. c. 64))
Shoreditch to Stamford Hill Road Act 1737 (repealed)	11 Geo. 2. c. 29	20 May 1738
An Act for repairing the Road from Shoreditch Church, through Hackney, to Stanford Hill, and cross Cambridge Heath, over Bethnall Green, to the Turnpike at Mile End, in the County of Middlesex. (Repealed by Road from Shoreditch Church through Hackney Act 1821 (1 & 2 Geo. 4 c. cxii))
Crown Lands (Forfeited Estates) (Greenwich Hospital) Act 1737 (repealed)	11 Geo. 2. c. 30	20 May 1738
An Act for explaining and amending an Act of the Eighth Year of His present Majesty's Reign, intituled, "An Act for the Application of the Rents and Profits of the Estates forfeited by the Attainders of James late Earl of Derwentwater and Charles Radcliffe." (Note: Forfeited Estates (Greenwich Hospital) Act 1734 (8 Geo. 2. c. 29)) (Repealed by Statute Law Revision Act 1948 (11 & 12 Geo. 6. c. 62))
Indemnity Act 1737 (repealed)	11 Geo. 2. c. 31	20 May 1738
An Act to indemnify Persons who have omitted to qualify themselves for Offices, or to read the Prayers, and make the Declarations and Subscriptions required, within the respective Times limited by Law; and for allowing further Time for those Purposes. (Repealed by Statute Law Revision Act 1867 (30 & 31 Vict. c. 59))
Liverpool Dock Act 1737 (repealed)	11 Geo. 2. c. 32	20 May 1738
An Act for enlarging the Time granted by an Act passed in the Third Year of the Reign of His late Majesty King George, (Note: Liverpool Docks Act 1716 (3 Geo. 1. c. 1 Pr.)) intituled, "An Act for enlarging the Time granted by an Act passed in the Eighth Year of the Reign of Her late Majesty Queen Anne, (Note: Liverpool Docks Act 1709 (8 Ann. c. 8)) intituled, 'An Act for making a convenient Dock, or Bason, at Liverpoole, for the Security of all Ships trading to and from the said Port of Liverpoole;'" and for enlarging the same, by making an additional Dock, and building a Pier in the open Harbour there; and for enlightening the said Dock. (Repealed by Mersey Dock Acts Consolidation Act 1858 (21 & 22 Vict. c. xcii))
Derby Roads Act 1737 (repealed)	11 Geo. 2. c. 33	20 May 1738
An Act for repairing the Roads from the Town of Loughborough, in the County of Leicester, to the Town of Derby, in the County of Derby; and from the said Town of Derby, to the Town of Brassington, in the said County of Derby; and from the said Town of Derby, through the Town of Ashborne, in the said County of Derby, to Hurdloe House, in the Parish of Hartingdon, in the said County. (Repealed by Road from Cavendish Bridge to Hulland Ward (Derbyshire) Act 1827 (7 & 8 Geo. 4. c. l))
Cawdle Fen, etc., Drainage Act 1737	11 Geo. 2. c. 34	20 May 1738
An Act for the more effectual Draining and Preservation of certain Fens, called Cawdle Fen, Waterden, and Redmore, and One Piece of Fen Ground, called The Holts, in the Isle of Ely, in the County of Cambridge.
Christchurch, Middlesex (Lights and Watch) Act 1737 (repealed)	11 Geo. 2. c. 35	20 May 1738
An Act for the better enlightening the open Places, Streets, Lanes, Passages, and Courts, and for the better regulating the Nightly Watch and Beadles, within the Parish of Christ Church, in the County of Middlesex. (Repealed by Christchurch, Middlesex Act 1772 (12 Geo. 3. c. 38))
Surrey and Kent Roads Act 1737 (repealed)	11 Geo. 2. c. 36	20 May 1738
An Act for enlarging the Term and Powers granted by Two Acts of Parliament, one of the Fourth, (Note: Southwark, Greenwich and Lewisham Roads Act 1717 (4 Geo. 1. c. 5 Pr.)) and the other of the Sixth, (Note: Surrey and Kent Roads Act 1719 (6 Geo. 1. c. 26)) Year of the Reign of His late Majesty King George the First, for repairing the Roads from The Stones End, in Kent Street, in the Parish of St. George, in Southwark, in the County of Surrey (leading to The Lime Kilns in East Greenwich) to the First Mill Pond at South End, in the Parish of Lewisham, in the County of Kent; and for amending the Road from Westminster Ferry, at Lambeth, in the said County of Surrey, to New Cross, in Deptford, in the said County of Kent; and for amending and making the said Acts more effectual; and for amending the Roads from The Lime Kilns aforesaid, to the Town of Dartford, in the said County; and from a Place called Saint Thomas a Waterings, in the said Parish of Saint George, to The Stones End, in Bermondsey-street, in the said County of Surrey. (Repealed by Statute Law (Repeals) Act 2013 (c. 2))
Kent Roads Act 1737 (repealed)	11 Geo. 2. c. 37	20 May 1738
An Act for enlarging the Term and Powers granted in and by an Act, made in the Tenth Year of Her late Majesty Queen Anne, (Note: Kent Roads Act 1711 (10 Ann. c. 16)) for enlarging, amending, and maintaining, the Road between Northfleet, Gravesend, and Rochester, in the County of Kent; and also another Act, made in the Eleventh Year of His late Majesty King George the First, (Note: Kent Roads Act 1724 (11 Geo. 1. c. 5)) for enlarging the Term granted by the said former Act; and for other Purposes therein mentioned; and for explaining and amending the said Acts; and also for repairing the Highway from Northfleet aforesaid to Dartford, in the said County. (Repealed by Road from Dartford to Strood Act 1822 (3 Geo. 4. c. lxx))
Estate of Hugh Naish Act 1737 (repealed)	11 Geo. 2. c. 38	20 May 1738
An Act for vesting the Real and Personal Estate of Hugh Naish Esquire (who was late a Prisoner in His Majesty's Prison of The Fleet, and escaped out of the same) in Trustees, for the Benefit of his Creditors. (Repealed by Statute Law Revision Act 1948 (11 & 12 Geo. 6. c. 62))
Deeping Fen Drainage Act 1737 (repealed)	11 Geo. 2. c. 39	20 May 1738
An Act to enable the Adventurers, Owners, and Proprietors, of the Taxable Lands, and the Owners and Proprietors of the Free Lands, in Deeping Fens, and other Fens, in the County of Lincoln, therein mentioned, to raise a competent Sum of Money, for the effectual Draining and future Preservation of all the said Fens, according to their Agreement in that Behalf, and to carry the said Agreement into Execution; and for other Purposes therein mentioned. (Repealed by Deeping Fen Drainage Act 1856 (19 & 20 Vict. c. lxv))

=== Private acts ===
Short title	Citation	Royal assent
Long title
Blydesteyn's Naturalization Act 1737	11 Geo. 2. c. 1 Pr.	21 March 1738
An Act for naturalizing Abraham Blydesteyn.
Duke of Devonshire's Estate Act 1737	11 Geo. 2. c. 2 Pr.	20 May 1738
An Act for vesting the Manor of Goldborn, Part of the settled Estate of William Duke of Devonshire, in the County of Lancaster, in the said Duke and his Heirs; and for settling the Manor of Black Wall, in the County of Derby, in Lieu thereof, to the like Uses.
Vesting lands in Kent, Sussex, Essex, Herefordshire, Monmouthshire and London entailed by Elizabeth Duchess of Bedford's will, in John Duke of Bedford and settling other estates in Buckinghamshire and Hertfordshire.	11 Geo. 2. c. 3 Pr.	20 May 1738
An Act for vesting divers Lands and Hereditaments, in the Counties of Kent, Suffolk, Essex, Hereford, and Monmouth, and the City of London, entailed by the Will of Elizabeth late Dutchess of Bedford, in John Duke of Bedford, in Fee Simple; and for settling other Estates, in the Counties of Bucks and Hertford, of greater Value, to the like Uses, in Lieu thereof.
Earl of Burlington and Corke's Estate Act 1737	11 Geo. 2. c. 4 Pr.	20 May 1738
An Act for vesting certain Lands and Hereditaments in the Kingdom of Ireland, Part of the settled Estate of Richard Earl of Burlington and Corke, in Trustees, to be sold, for Payment of Debts; and for settling other Lands and Hereditaments, of greater Value, to the same Uses.
Explaining and amending a trust and power contained in Richard Viscount Molyneux's marriage settlement, for raising, better ascertaining and more effectually securing portions for his daughters.	11 Geo. 2. c. 5 Pr.	20 May 1738
An Act for explaining and amending a certain Trust and Power contained in the Settlement made on the Marriage of Richard Lord Viscount Molyneux, of the Kingdom of Ireland, with Mary Lady Molyneux, his now Wife, for raising Portions for the Daughters of the said Marriage; and for the better ascertaining and more effectually securing the said Portions.
Morice's Divorce Act 1737	11 Geo. 2. c. 6 Pr.	20 May 1738
An Act to dissolve the Marriage of Sir William Morice Baronet with Lady Lucy Wharton; and to enable him to marry again; and for other Purposes therein mentioned.
Enabling Sir Bryan Broughton to enter into marriage articles despite his infancy.	11 Geo. 2. c. 7 Pr.	20 May 1738
An Act to enable Sir Brian Broughton Baronet, an Infant, to enter into Marriage Articles, notwithstanding his Infancy.
Exchange of part of the glebe belonging to the rector of Stratford Toney (Wiltshire) for lands belonging to the lord of the manor.	11 Geo. 2. c. 8 Pr.	20 May 1738
An Act for exchanging Part of the Glebe Lands and Hereditaments belonging to the Rector of Stratford Toney, in the County of Wilts, for other Lands belonging to the Lord of the Manor.
May's Estate Act 1737	11 Geo. 2. c. 9 Pr.	20 May 1738
An Act to enable Trustees to grant Building Leases of certain Messuages, in the Parishes of Saint Martin in the Fields and Saint Clement Danes, in the County of Middlesex, late the Estate of Henry May Esquire, deceased.
Coles's Estate Act 1737	11 Geo. 2. c. 10 Pr.	20 May 1738
An Act for confirming the Sale of the Leasehold Estate late of Barnaby Coles, Gentleman, deceased; and for vesting his Freehold Estates in Trustees, to be sold, for Payment of his Debts.
Enabling the guardians of Amy and Catherine Symes to join in making leases of lands in Somerset and Devon during their minorities.	11 Geo. 2. c. 11 Pr.	20 May 1738
An Act to enable the Guardian of Amy Symes and Catherine Symes, Infants, to join in making Leases of Lands, in the Counties of Somerset and Devon, with the other Owners thereof, during the Minority of the said Infants.
Confirming and establishing an agreement between William Studholm and Cuthbert Hodgson concerning Michael Studholm's will and estate.	11 Geo. 2. c. 12 Pr.	20 May 1738
An Act for confirming and establishing an Agreement between William Studholm Gentleman and Cuthbert Hodgson Gentleman, in relation to the Will and Estate of Michael Studholm Esquire, deceased.
Packer's Estate Act 1737	11 Geo. 2. c. 13 Pr.	20 May 1738
An Act for Sale of Part of the Estate late of Robert Packer Esquire, deceased, in the County of Berks, for discharging Encumbrances thereupon.
Byde's Estate Act 1737	11 Geo. 2. c. 14 Pr.	20 May 1738
An Act for vesting certain Mills, Lands, and Hereditaments, in the Parishes of Ware and Great Amwell, in the County of Hertford (being Part of the Estate of Thomas Plummer Byde Esquire, an Infant, and comprized in his Grandfather's Marriage Settlement) in the Governor and Company of The New River, brought from Chadwell and Amwell to London, and their Successors; and for securing a perpetual Rent Charge in Lieu thereof, for the Benefit of the Persons claiming under the said Settlement.
Sowton's Estate Act 1737	11 Geo. 2. c. 15 Pr.	20 May 1738
An Act for enabling John Sowton to make a Lease or Leases of certain Messuages and Tenements, and a Wharf, therein mentioned, situate in the Parish of St. Andrew Wardrobe, in the City of London.
Clark's Estate Act 1737	11 Geo. 2. c. 16 Pr.	20 May 1738
An Act to enable Dorothea Clerk to sell Lands in the County of Dumfries, for Payment of Debts charged thereupon; and to purchase other Lands, to be settled to the same Uses as the Estate to be sold, is settled.
Restitution of John Nairn Act 1737	11 Geo. 2. c. 17 Pr.	20 May 1738
An Act to enable John Nairne to sue, or maintain any Action or Suit, notwithstanding his Attainder; and to remove any Disability in him, by reason of his said Attainder, to take or inherit any Real or Personal Estate that may or shall hereafter descend or come to him.
Restitution of William Douglas Act 1737	11 Geo. 2. c. 18 Pr.	20 May 1738
An Act to enable William Douglas, Eldest lawful Son to Sir Robert Douglas of Glenbervie Baronet, to sue or maintain any Action or Suit, notwithstanding his Attainder, and to remove any Disability in him, by reason of his said Attainder, to take or inherit any Real or Personal Estate that may have descended or come to him since His late Majesty's most Gracious Pardon, dated the Sixth Day of February, in the Sixth Year of His Reign, or that shall hereafter descend or come to him.
Reducing the stint of the horse and beast pastures and sheep commons in Castle Donington (Leicestershire).	11 Geo. 2. c. 19 Pr.	20 May 1738
An Act for reducing the Stint of the Horse or Beast Pastures, and Sheep Commons, within the Manor, Town, and Parish, of Castle Donington, in the County of Leicester.
Ashenden Inclosure Act 1737	11 Geo. 2. c. 20 Pr.	20 May 1738
An Act for enclosing and dividing the Common Fields, Wastes, and Unenclosed Grounds, within the Manor, Township, or Hamlet, of Ashenden, in the County of Bucks; and for the making effectual certain Exchanges therein mentioned.
Speen Mead or Speen Moor (Berkshire) Inclosure Act 1737	11 Geo. 2. c. 21 Pr.	20 May 1738
An Act for enclosing and dividing the Common Mead, or Moor, called Speen Mead, or Speen Moor, in the County of Berks.
Binbrooke Inclosure Act 1737	11 Geo. 2. c. 22 Pr.	20 May 1738
An Act for enclosing and dividing the Common Fields and Common Grounds, in the Manor and Parish of Binbroke, in the County of Lincoln.
Meux's Name Act 1737	11 Geo. 2. c. 23 Pr.	20 May 1738
An Act to enable William Massingberd Esquire, heretofore called William Meux, and the Heirs Male of his Body, to take and use the Surname of Massingberd, pursuant to a Settlement made by Sir William Massingberd Baronet, deceased.
May's Name Act 1737	11 Geo. 2. c. 24 Pr.	20 May 1738
An Act to enable Thomas May Esquire and his Sons, and the Heirs Male of their Bodies, to take and use the Surname of Knight, pursuant to the Will of Elizabeth Knight, deceased.
Naturalization of John Bruning, Peter Untzellman, Henry Klencke and Others Act 1737	11 Geo. 2. c. 25 Pr.	20 May 1738
An Act for naturalizing John Justin Bruningk, Peter Untzellman, Henry Klencke, and others.
Rigail's Naturalization Act 1737	11 Geo. 2. c. 26 Pr.	20 May 1738
An Act for naturalizing Philip Rigail.
Naturalization of Herman Bernard and John Bosquain Act 1737	11 Geo. 2. c. 27 Pr.	20 May 1738
An Act to naturalize Herman Bernard and John Bosquain.
Naturalization of Frederick Vander Meulen Act 1737	11 Geo. 2. c. 28 Pr.	20 May 1738
An Act to naturalize Frederick Vander Meulen.

=== Sources ===
- Pickering, Danby, ed. (1765). The Statutes at Large. Vol. 17: From the Ninth to the 15th Year of King George II. pp. 169–244 – via Internet Archive.
- Pickering, Danby, ed. (1765). The Statutes at Large. Vol. 17: From the Ninth to the 15th Year of King George II. pp. 169–244 – via Google Books.
- Journals of the House of Commons. Vol. 23. London: His Majesty's Stationery Office. 1803. pp. 3–205 – via Google Books.
- Chronological Table of and Index to the Statutes. Vol. 1: To the End of the Session 59 Vict. Sess. 2 (1895) (13th ed.). London: Her Majesty's Stationery Office. 1896. pp. 104–105 – via Google Books.
- "Acts of the Parliament of Great Britain from 1737". legislation.gov.uk. The National Archives.

== See also ==
- List of acts of the Parliament of Great Britain
