= Frederick W. Cole =

British stained-glass artist

Frederick W. Cole MA, RF, FMGP (1908-1998) was a British Stained-glass artist and designer.

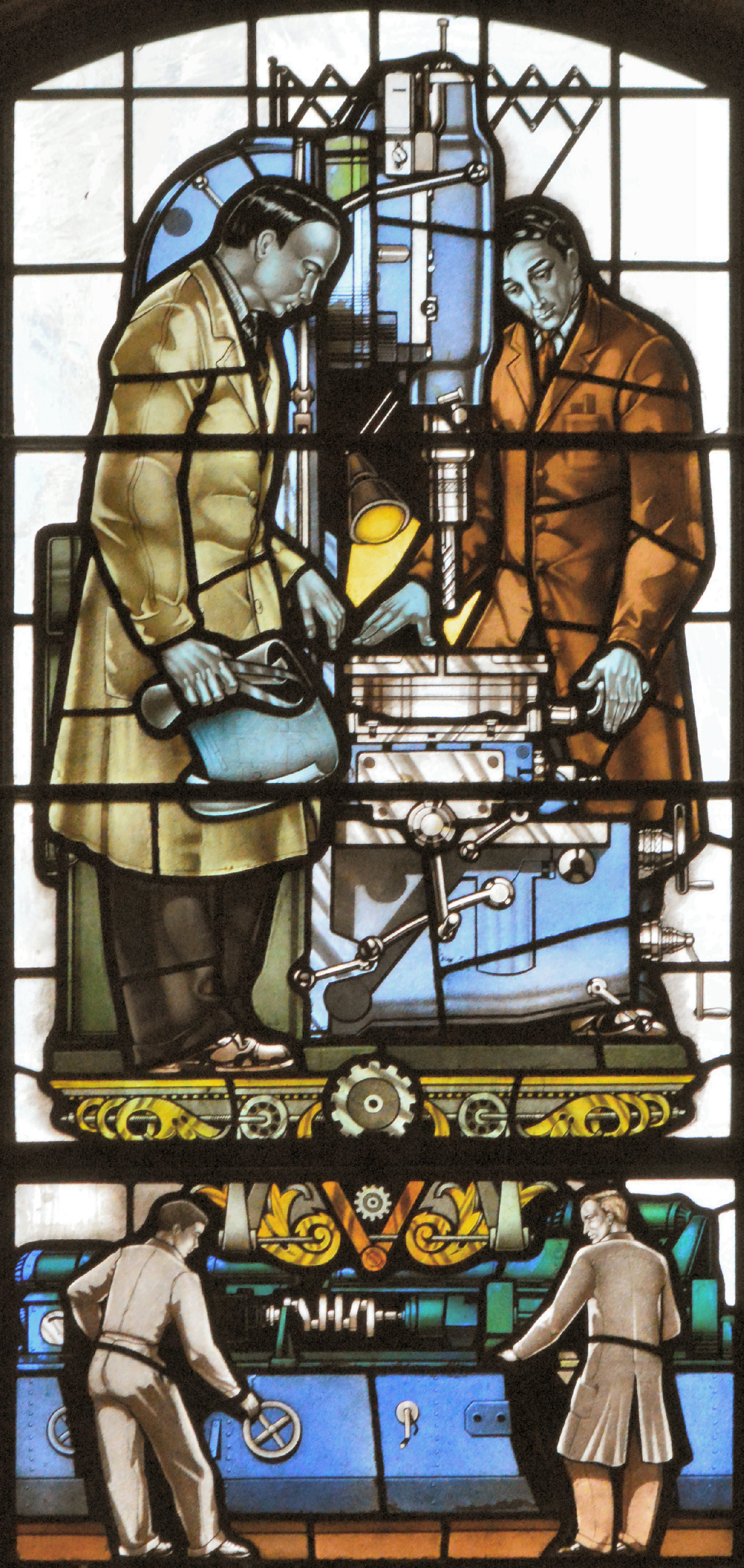
Southwark, Christ Church, Stained glass window

== Career ==
He was born in Lewisham and trained at the Camberwell School of Art. He joined William Morris & Co., Westminster in 1926 where he designed stained-glass for them up to the war. His work was exhibited at the Royal Academy. During the war he served in the army. In 1946 after the company was re-established at Great Peter Street, London, he was invited to equip and train new staff, becoming their chief designer; the firm finally closed in 1958. He was elected a fellow of the British Society of Master Glass Painters. He also attended the Lambeth School of Sculpture and was awarded the Sir Edward Lutyens Medal for Sculpture in 1952. He worked for J. Wippell & Co. of Exeter until 1961, after which he ran his own studio in Fulham until 1971.
