= List of acts of the 1st session of the 4th Parliament of the United Kingdom =

This is a complete list of acts of the 1st session of the 4th Parliament of the United Kingdom which had regnal year 47 Geo. 3. Sess. 2. This session met from 22 June 1807 until 14 August 1807.

== 1807 ==
The first session of the 4th Parliament of the United Kingdom, which met from 22 June 1807 until 14 August 1807.

This session was also traditionally cited as 47 Geo. 3. sess. 2, 47 G. 3. Sess. 2 or 47 G. 3. sess. 2.

=== Public general acts ===
Short title	Citation	Royal assent
Long title
Importation and Exportation (Ireland) Act 1807 (repealed)	47 Geo. 3 Sess. 2. c. 1	7 July 1807
An Act to continue until the Fifth Day of July One thousand eight hundred and eight, several Acts for granting certain Rates and Duties, and for allowing certain Drawbacks and Bounties on Goods, Wares, and Merchandize, imported into and exported from Ireland. (Repealed by Statute Law Revision Act 1872 (No. 2) (35 & 36 Vict. c. 97))
Treaty of Commerce, etc., with America Act 1807 (repealed)	47 Geo. 3 Sess. 2. c. 2	17 July 1807
An Act to revive and continue, until the Expiration of Six Weeks after the Commencement of the next Session of Parliament, Three Acts passed in the Thirty-seventh, (Note: Treaty with United States Act 1797 (37 Geo. 3. c. 97)) Forty-fifth, (Note: Treaty of Commerce, etc., with America Act 1805 (45 Geo. 3. c. 35)) and Forty-sixth (Note: Treaty of Commerce, etc., with America Act 1806 (46 Geo. 3. c. 16)) Years of His Majesty's Reign, for carrying into Execution the Treaty of Amity, Commerce, and Navigation, (Note: The 'Treaty of Amity, Commerce, and Navigation' was the Jay Treaty.) between His Majesty and the United States of America; and for empowering His Majesty to suspend, before the First Day of March One thousand eight hundred and eight, the Provisions of the said Acts for such Period as His Majesty may deem expedient. (Repealed by Statute Law Revision Act 1872 (No. 2) (35 & 36 Vict. c. 97))
Indemnity (No. 2) Act 1807 (repealed)	47 Geo. 3 Sess. 2. c. 3	17 July 1807
An Act to indemnify Persons who have advised or acted under an Order of Council for making Regulations with respect to the Navigation and Commerce between His Majesty's Subjects and the Subjects of the United States of America. (Repealed by Statute Law Revision Act 1872 (No. 2) (35 & 36 Vict. c. 97))
Annuity to Major-General Sir John Stuart Act 1807 (repealed)	47 Geo. 3 Sess. 2. c. 4	17 July 1807
An Act to enable His Majesty to grant a certain Annuity to Major General Sir John Stuart, Knight of the most Honourable Order of the Bath, in Consideration of the eminent Services which he has rendered to His Majesty and the Publick. (Repealed by Statute Law Revision Act 1872 (No. 2) (35 & 36 Vict. c. 97))
Kilmainham Hospital Pensions Act 1807 (repealed)	47 Geo. 3 Sess. 2. c. 5	17 July 1807
An Act for empowering the Commissioners of Kilmainham Hospital to make Rules and Regulations for the Payment of Pensions to Soldiers on the Establishment of that Hospital. (Repealed by Chelsea and Kilmainham Hospitals Act 1826 (7 Geo. 4]. c. 16))
Loans or Exchequer Bills (No. 2) Act 1807 (repealed)	47 Geo. 3 Sess. 2. c. 6	17 July 1807
An Act for raising the Sum of Three Millions by Loans or Exchequer Bills, for the Service of Great Britain for the Year One thousand eight hundred and seven. (Repealed by Statute Law Revision Act 1872 (No. 2) (35 & 36 Vict. c. 97))
Loans or Exchequer Bills (No. 3) Act 1807 (repealed)	47 Geo. 3 Sess. 2. c. 7	17 July 1807
An Act for raising the Sum of One Million five hundred thousand Pounds, by Loans or Exchequer Bills for the Service of Great Britain for the Year One thousand eight hundred and seven. (Repealed by Statute Law Revision Act 1872 (No. 2) (35 & 36 Vict. c. 97))
Recoveries in Copyhold, etc., Courts Act 1807 (repealed)	47 Geo. 3 Sess. 2. c. 8	17 July 1807
An Act concerning Common Recoveries suffered in Copyhold or Customary Courts by Attorney. (Repealed by Infants' Property Act 1830 (11 Geo. 4 & 1 Will. 4. c. 65))
Lotteries Act 1807 (repealed)	47 Geo. 3 Sess. 2. c. 9	25 July 1807
An Act for granting to His Majesty a Sum of Money to be raised by Lotteries. (Repealed by Statute Law Revision Act 1872 (No. 2) (35 & 36 Vict. c. 97))
Export of Salted Beef, etc. (Ireland) Act 1807 (repealed)	47 Geo. 3 Sess. 2. c. 10	25 July 1807
An Act for encouraging the Export of salted Beef and Pork from Ireland. (Repealed by Statute Law Revision Act 1861 (24 & 25 Vict. c. 101))
Assessed Taxes, etc. (Ireland) Act 1807 (repealed)	47 Geo. 3 Sess. 2. c. 11	25 July 1807
An Act to provide for the Recovery of Penalties under certain Acts, made in the Forty-seventh Year of His present Majesty, for securing the Rates and Duties in Ireland in respect of Dwelling Houses, Fire Hearths, Windows, Male Servants, Horses, Dogs, and Carriages; and on Licences to Persons dealing in Exciseable Commodities; and on Paper and Paper Hangings; and to alter the Condition of certain Bonds to be given by Brewers in Ireland. (Repealed by Statute Law Revision Act 1861 (24 & 25 Vict. c. 101))
Sale of Liquors by Retail (Ireland) Act 1807	47 Geo. 3 Sess. 2. c. 12	25 July 1807
An Act to make further Regulations with respect to Licences for the Sale of Spirituous and other Liquors by Retail in Ireland.
Insurrection and Disturbances (Ireland) Act 1807	47 Geo. 3 Sess. 2. c. 13	1 August 1807
An Act to suppress Insurrections, and prevent the Disturbance of the Public Peace in Ireland.
Excise and Stamps (Ireland) Act 1807 (repealed)	47 Geo. 3 Sess. 2. c. 14	1 August 1807
An Act to repeal certain Duties of Excise, and also certain Stamp Duties in Ireland, and to grant certain new Stamp Duties in lieu thereof; and to amend the Laws relating to the Stamp Duties in Ireland. (Repealed by Statute Law Revision Act 1861 (24 & 25 Vict. c. 101))
Plate Assay (Ireland) Act 1807	47 Geo. 3 Sess. 2. c. 15	1 August 1807
An Act to provide for the regulating and securing the Collection of the Duty on Gold and Silver Plate wrought or manufactured in Ireland.
Importation and Exportation (Ireland) (No. 2) Act 1807 (repealed)	47 Geo. 3 Sess. 2. c. 16	1 August 1807
An Act to grant to His Majesty until the Fifth Day of July One thousand eight hundred and eight certain Duties on the Importation, and to allow Drawbacks on the Exportation of certain Goods, Wares, and Merchandize, into and from Ireland. (Repealed by Statute Law Revision Act 1861 (24 & 25 Vict. c. 101))
Duties on Spirits (Ireland) Act 1807	47 Geo. 3 Sess. 2. c. 17	1 August 1807
An Act to amend an Act made in the Forty-sixth Year of His present Majesty, (Note: Duties on Spirits (Ireland) (No. 2) Act 1806 (46 Geo. 3. c. 88)) for the regulating and securing the Collection of the Duties on Spirits distilled in Ireland.
Countervailing Duties (Ireland) Act 1807 (repealed)	47 Geo. 3 Sess. 2. c. 18	1 August 1807
An Act to provide for the Decrease and Suspension, in certain Cases, of Part of the Countervailing Duties on British Refined Sugar imported into Ireland. (Repealed by Statute Law Revision Act 1872 (No. 2) (35 & 36 Vict. c. 97))
Rectifying of Spirits (Ireland) Act 1807 (repealed)	47 Geo. 3 Sess. 2. c. 19	1 August 1807
An Act to continue, until the Twenty-ninth Day of September One thousand eight hundred and eight, and to amend, Two Acts made in the Parliament of Ireland, (Note: Rectifying of Spirits Act 1798 (38 Geo. 3. c. 52 (I))) (Note: Rectifying of Spirits Act 1799 (39 Geo. 3. c. 58 (I))) to regulate the Trade of Rectifying Spirits. (Repealed by Statute Law Revision Act 1861 (24 & 25 Vict. c. 101))
Commissioners of the Treasury Act 1807 (repealed)	47 Geo. 3 Sess. 2. c. 20	1 August 1807
An Act to enable His Majesty to appoint the Chancellor of the Exchequer, for the Time being in Ireland, One of the Commissioners for executing the Office of Lord High Treasurer in England, without Salary. (Repealed by Statute Law Revision Act 1861 (24 & 25 Vict. c. 101))
Annuities (Ireland) Act 1807 (repealed)	47 Geo. 3 Sess. 2. c. 21	1 August 1807
An Act to continue until the Twenty-ninth Day of September One thousand eight hundred and seventeen, an Act, passed in Ireland in the Thirteenth and Fourteenth Years of His present Majesty, (Note: Annuities (No. 2) Act 1773 (13 & 14 Geo. 3. c. 7 (I))) respecting certain Annuities. (Repealed by Statute Law Revision Act 1872 (No. 2) (35 & 36 Vict. c. 97))
Fisheries (Ireland) Act 1807 (repealed)	47 Geo. 3 Sess. 2. c. 22	1 August 1807
An Act to continue until the Twenty-ninth Day of September One thousand eight hundred and seventeen, an Act, passed in Ireland in the Thirty-sixth Year of His present Majesty, (Note: Sea Fisheries Act 1796 (36 Geo. 3. c. 52 (I))) for the Improvement and Extension of the Fisheries on the Coasts of Ireland. (Repealed by Statute Law Revision Act 1872 (No. 2) (35 & 36 Vict. c. 97))
Grants for Glebe Houses (Ireland) Act 1807 (repealed)	47 Geo. 3 Sess. 2. c. 23	1 August 1807
An Act to amend an Act, passed in the Forty-third Year of His present Majesty, (Note: Glebe Houses (Ireland) Act 1803 (43 Geo. 3. c. 158)) for granting to His Majesty the Sum of Fifty thousand Pounds for building Glebe Houses in Ireland. (Repealed by Statute Law Revision Act 1861 (24 & 25 Vict. c. 101))
Crown Lands, Escheats Act 1807 (repealed)	47 Geo. 3 Sess. 2. c. 24	1 August 1807
An Act to explain and amend an Act, passed in the Thirty-ninth and Fortieth Year of His present Majesty, (Note: Crown Private Estate Act 1800 (39 & 40 Geo. 3. c. 88)) concerning the Disposition of certain Real and Personal Property of His Majesty, His Heirs and Successors, and also of the Real and Personal Property of Her Majesty, and of the Queen Consort for the Time being. (Repealed by Statute Law Revision Act 1872 (No. 2) (35 & 36 Vict. c. 97))
Half-pay and Pensions Act 1807 (repealed)	47 Geo. 3 Sess. 2. c. 25	1 August 1807
An Act for the more convenient Payment of Half Pay and Pensions, and other Allowances to Officers and Widows of Officers, and to Persons upon the Compassionate List. (Repealed by Army Act 1881 (44 & 45 Vict. c. 58))
Militia Pay, etc. (Ireland) Act 1807 (repealed)	47 Geo. 3 Sess. 2. c. 26	1 August 1807
An Act for defraying until the Twenty-fifth Day of March One thousand eight hundred and eight, the Charge of the Pay and Cloathing of the Militia of Ireland; for holding Courts Martial on Serjeant Majors, Serjeants, Corporals, and Drummers, for Offences committed during the Time such Militia shall not be embodied; and for making Allowances in certain Cases to Subaltern Officers of the said Militia during Peace. (Repealed by Statute Law Revision Act 1872 (No. 2) (35 & 36 Vict. c. 97))
Importation (No. 4) Act 1807 (repealed)	47 Geo. 3 Sess. 2. c. 27	1 August 1807
An Act to authorize His Majesty to permit the Importation of Naval Stores from any Place in Ships belonging to States in Amity with His Majesty, and navigated in any Manner whatever. (Repealed by Customs Law Repeal Act 1825 (6 Geo. 4. c. 105))
Exchequer Bills Act 1807 (repealed)	47 Geo. 3 Sess. 2. c. 28	1 August 1807
An Act to enable the Lords Commissioners of His Majesty's Treasury to issue Exchequer Bills, on the Credit of such Aids or Supplies as have been or shall be granted by Parliament for the Service of Great Britain, for the Year One thousand eight hundred and seven. (Repealed by Statute Law Revision Act 1872 (No. 2) (35 & 36 Vict. c. 97))
Militia Pay (Great Britain) Act 1807 (repealed)	47 Geo. 3 Sess. 2. c. 29	1 August 1807
An Act for defraying the Charge of the Pay and Clothing of the Militia in Great Britain for the Year One thousand eight hundred and seven. (Repealed by Statute Law Revision Act 1872 (No. 2) (35 & 36 Vict. c. 97))
Excise, etc. (Great Britain) Act 1807 (repealed)	47 Geo. 3 Sess. 2. c. 30	1 August 1807
An Act to amend several Laws of Excise in Great Britain relating to the Duties on Salt, Sope, Paper, Coffee, Cocoa Nuts, Spirits, and Glass, and for restoring Seizures in certain Cases. (Repealed by Statute Law Revision Act 1861 (24 & 25 Vict. c. 101))
Militia Allowances Act 1807 (repealed)	47 Geo. 3 Sess. 2. c. 31	1 August 1807
An Act for defraying the Charge of the Pay and Clothing of the Militia in Great Britain for the Year One thousand eight hundred and seven. (Repealed by Statute Law Revision Act 1872 (No. 2) (35 & 36 Vict. c. 97))
Militia Allowances (No. 2) Act 1807 (repealed)	47 Geo. 3 Sess. 2. c. 32	1 August 1807
An Act for making Allowances in certain Cases to Subaltern Officers of the Militia in Great Britain, while disembodied. (Repealed by Statute Law Revision Act 1872 (No. 2) (35 & 36 Vict. c. 97))
Inquiry into Military Departments Act 1807 (repealed)	47 Geo. 3 Sess. 2. c. 33	1 August 1807
An Act to continue until the First Day of June One thousand eight hundred and eight, an Act of the Forty-fifth Year of His present Majesty, (Note: Inquiry into Military Departments Act 1805 (45 Geo. 3. c. 47)) for appointing Commissioners to enquire into the Public Expenditure, and the Conduct of the Public Business in the Military Departments therein mentioned. (Repealed by Statute Law Revision Act 1872 (No. 2) (35 & 36 Vict. c. 97))
Importation and Exportation Act 1807	47 Geo. 3 Sess. 2. c. 34	1 August 1807
An Act to make the Port of Amsterdam, in the Island of Curaçoa, a free Port.
Indemnity (No. 3) Act 1807 (repealed)	47 Geo. 3 Sess. 2. c. 35	1 August 1807
An Act to indemnify such Persons in the United Kingdom as have omitted to qualify themselves for Offices and Employments; and for extending the Times limited for those Purposes respectively, until the Twenty-fifth Day of March One thousand eight hundred and eight; and to permit such Persons in Great Britain as have omitted to make and file Affidavits of the Execution of Indentures of Clerks to Attornies and Solicitors, to make and file the same on or before the First Day of Hilary Term One thousand eight hundred and eight. (Repealed by Promissory Oaths Act 1871 (34 & 35 Vict. c. 48))
British Museum Act 1807 (repealed)	47 Geo. 3 Sess. 2. c. 36	8 August 1807
An Act to enable the Trustees of the British Museum to exchange, sell or dispose of such parts of the Collections, and under such Restrictions, as are therein specified. (Repealed by British Museum Act 1963 (c. 24))
Excise (No. 2) Act 1807 (repealed)	47 Geo. 3 Sess. 2. c. 37	8 August 1807
An Act to revive and continue, until the Twenty-fifth Day of March One thousand eight hundred and eight, an Act of the Forty-sixth Year of His present Majesty, (Note: Malt Duties (No. 2) Act 1806 (46 Geo. 3. c. 139)) for altering and amending several Laws relating to the Duties of Excise upon Malt. (Repealed by Statute Law Revision Act 1872 (No. 2) (35 & 36 Vict. c. 97))
Trade Act 1807 (repealed)	47 Geo. 3 Sess. 2. c. 38	8 August 1807
An Act for permitting, until the Twenty-fifth Day of March One thousand eight hundred and nine, and from thence to the End of the then next Session of Parliament, the Importation of certain enumerated Articles into the British Colonies on the Continent of North America, from the United States of America, and the Exportation of other enumerated Articles from the same Colonies, to the said States. (Repealed by Statute Law Revision Act 1872 (No. 2) (35 & 36 Vict. c. 97))
Public Accountants, etc. Act 1807	47 Geo. 3 Sess. 2. c. 39	8 August 1807
An Act for more effectually charging Publick Accountants with Interest upon Balances; and for other Purposes relating to the passing of Publick Accounts.
Practice in Court of Chancery Act 1807 (repealed)	47 Geo. 3 Sess. 2. c. 40	8 August 1807
An Act to alter the Practice of Courts of Equity in Suits in which Members of Parliament are Defendants. (Repealed by Statute Law Revision Act 1872 (No. 2) (35 & 36 Vict. c. 97))
East India Company Act 1807 (repealed)	47 Geo. 3 Sess. 2. c. 41	8 August 1807
An Act to enable the East India Company to raise Money upon Bond instead of increasing their Capital Stock. (Repealed by Statute Law Revision Act 1873 (36 & 37 Vict. c. 91))
Police Magistrates, Metropolis Act 1807	47 Geo. 3 Sess. 2. c. 42	8 August 1807
An Act to continue until the First Day of June One thousand eight hundred and ten, and from thence to the End of the then next Session of Parliament, and amend an Act of the Forty-second Year of His present Majesty, (Note: Metropolitan Police Magistrates Act 1802 (42 Geo. 3. c. 76)) for more effectual Administration of the Office of a Justice of the Peace in such Parts of the Counties of Middlesex and Surrey as lie in and near the Metropolis; and for the more effectual Prevention of Felonies.
Woollen Manufacture Act 1807 (repealed)	47 Geo. 3 Sess. 2. c. 43	8 August 1807
An Act to revive and continue, until the End of the next Session of Parliament, an Act of the Forty-sixth Year of His present Majesty, (Note: Woollen Manufacture Act 1806 (46 Geo. 3. c. 18)) for suspending Proceedings in Actions and other Proceedings relating to the Woollen Manufacture. (Repealed by Statute Law Revision Act 1872 (No. 2) (35 & 36 Vict. c. 97))
Sierra Leone Company Act 1807 (repealed)	47 Geo. 3 Sess. 2. c. 44	8 August 1807
An Act for transferring to His Majesty, certain Possessions and Rights vested in the Sierra Leone Company, and for shortening the Duration of the said Company; and for preventing any dealing or trafficking in the buying or felling of Slaves within the Colony of Sierra Leone. (Repealed by Statute Law Revision Act 1872 (No. 2) (35 & 36 Vict. c. 97))
Grant of Frogmore, etc. Act 1807	47 Geo. 3 Sess. 2. c. 45	8 August 1807
An Act to enable His Majesty to grant to Her Majesty the Queen a Capital Messuage called Frogmore, and divers Lands and Hereditaments in the Parishes of New Windsor and Old Windsor, in the County of Berks, and a Piece of Land in Wyrothsbury, in the County of Bucks, for a Term of Ninety-nine Years, if Her Majesty and the Princesses, Her Five younger Daughters, or any of them, shall so long live, for and in lieu of Her Majesty's present Terms and Interest therein; and also to make Exchanges.
Windsor Forest Boundary Commission Act 1807 (repealed)	47 Geo. 3 Sess. 2. c. 46	8 August 1807
An Act to repeal certain Provisions of an Act, passed in the Forty-sixth Year of His present Majesty, (Note: Windsor Forest Act 1806 (46 Geo. 3. c. 143)) for inquiring into the State of Windsor Forest, in the County of Berks, and for ascertaining the Boundaries of the said Forest, and of the Lands of the Crown within the same; and to amend the said Act. (Repealed by Statute Law Revision Act 1872 (No. 2) (35 & 36 Vict. c. 97))
Duties on Calicoes, etc. Act 1807 (repealed)	47 Geo. 3 Sess. 2. c. 47	8 August 1807
An Act to grant certain Duties on Callicoes, Muslins, Cotton Yarn, and Cotton Twist, of the Manufacture of Great Britain or Ireland respectively, on their Importation into either Country from the other, according to the Regulations contained in the Acts for the Union of Great Britain and Ireland. (Repealed by Statute Law Revision Act 1872 (No. 2) (35 & 36 Vict. c. 97))
Customs and Excise (Ireland) Act 1807 (repealed)	47 Geo. 3 Sess. 2. c. 48	8 August 1807
An Act to continue until the Twenty-ninth Day of September One thousand eight hundred and eight, several Acts for the better Collection and Security of the Revenues of Customs and Excise in Ireland, and for preventing Frauds therein. (Repealed by Statute Law Revision Act 1872 (No. 2) (35 & 36 Vict. c. 97))
Drawback Act 1807 (repealed)	47 Geo. 3 Sess. 2. c. 49	8 August 1807
An Act for allowing a Drawback on certain Linens exported from Great Britain to the West Indies. (Repealed by Statute Law Revision Act 1872 (No. 2) (35 & 36 Vict. c. 97))
County Infirmaries (Ireland) Act 1807	47 Geo. 3 Sess. 2. c. 50	8 August 1807
An Act to amend an Act made in the Parliament of Ireland in the Fifth Year of his present Majesty’s Reign, for erecting and establishing Publick Infirmaries or Hospitals in Ireland.
British Fisheries Act 1807	47 Geo. 3 Sess. 2. c. 51	8 August 1807
An Act to revive and continue until the Twenty-fifth Day March One thousand eight hundred and eight, an Act of Thirty-ninth Year of His present Majesty, (Note: British Fisheries Society Act 1799 (39 Geo. 3. c. 100)) for the more effectual Encouragement of the British Fisheries.
Duty on Coffee, etc., Warehoused Act 1807 (repealed)	47 Geo. 3 Sess. 2. c. 52	8 August 1807
An Act to repeal so much of an Act of the last Session of Parliament, (Note: Bonding of Coffee, etc. Act 1807 (47 Geo. 3 Sess. 1. c. 48)) as relates to the Payment of Duty on Coffee and Cocoa Nuts when exported from the Warehouse in which the same shall have been secured. (Repealed by Statute Law Revision Act 1872 (No. 2) (35 & 36 Vict. c. 97))
Post Office Act 1807 (repealed)	47 Geo. 3 Sess. 2. c. 53	8 August 1807
An Act to enable His Majesty's Postmaster General to open and return Letters directed to Hamburgh or other Places Abroad, and which have been or shall have been returned or not sent. (Repealed by Statute Law Revision Act 1861 (24 & 25 Vict. c. 101))
Possession of Arms (Ireland) Act 1807	47 Geo. 3 Sess. 2. c. 54	13 August 1807
An Act to prevent improper Persons from having Arms in Ireland.
Militia (Ireland) Act 1807 (repealed)	47 Geo. 3 Sess. 2. c. 55	13 August 1807
An Act for allowing a certain Proportion of the Militia in Ireland, voluntarily to enlist into His Majesty's Regular Forces. (Repealed by Statute Law Revision Act 1872 (No. 2) (35 & 36 Vict. c. 97))
Militia (Ireland) (No. 2) Act 1807 (repealed)	47 Geo. 3 Sess. 2. c. 56	13 August 1807
An Act for increasing the Militia of Ireland, under certain Limitations and Restrictions. (Repealed by Statute Law Revision Act 1861 (24 & 25 Vict. c. 101))
Militia (Great Britain) Act 1807 (repealed)	47 Geo. 3 Sess. 2. c. 57	13 August 1807
An Act for allowing a certain Proportion of the Militia in Britain voluntarily to enlist into His Majesty's Regular Forces. (Repealed by Statute Law Revision Act 1872 (No. 2) (35 & 36 Vict. c. 97))
Exportation (Ireland) Act 1807 (repealed)	47 Geo. 3 Sess. 2. c. 58	13 August 1807
An Act for encouraging the Exportation of Salt from Ireland. (Repealed by Customs Law Repeal Act 1825 (6 Geo. 4. c. 105))
Post Office (No. 2) Act 1807	47 Geo. 3 Sess. 2. c. 59	13 August 1807
An Act to amend an Act of the Forty-sixth Year of His Majesty, for the better Regulation of the Office of Receiver General of the Post Office in England.
Purchase of Quays in Port of London Act 1807	47 Geo. 3 Sess. 2. c. 60	13 August 1807
An Act to give further Time for purchasing the Legal Quays and Warehouses, in the Port of London.
Customs (No. 2) Act 1807 (repealed)	47 Geo. 3 Sess. 2. c. 61	13 August 1807
An Act to repeal certain Duties on Foreign Goods, Wares, and Merchandize exported from Great Britain to Ireland. (Repealed by Customs Law Repeal Act 1825 (6 Geo. 4. c. 105))
Drawbacks (No. 2) Act 1807 (repealed)	47 Geo. 3 Sess. 2. c. 62	13 August 1807
An Act to suspend, until the First Day of May One thousand eight hundred and eight, the Payment of all Drawbacks on Spirits made or distilled in Great Britain or Ireland, and exported from either Country to the other respectively. (Repealed by Statute Law Revision Act 1872 (No. 2) (35 & 36 Vict. c. 97))
Excise Duties and Drawbacks Act 1807 (repealed)	47 Geo. 3 Sess. 2. c. 63	13 August 1807
An Act for repealing the Duties and Drawback payable on Silks and for granting other Duties and another Drawback in lieu thereof. (Repealed by Statute Law Revision Act 1861 (24 & 25 Vict. c. 101))
Bounty on British Calicoes Act 1807 (repealed)	47 Geo. 3 Sess. 2. c. 64	13 August 1807
An Act to allow the Bounty now payable on British Callicoes and Cottons exported to Gibraltar to be paid on the same when exported to Malta. (Repealed by Customs Law Repeal Act 1825 (6 Geo. 4. c. 105))
Auction Duty Act 1807 (repealed)	47 Geo. 3 Sess. 2. c. 65	13 August 1807
An Act to exempt Sales of West India Produce, by the West India Dock Company, for Payment of Duties and Charges, from the Auction Duty. (Repealed by Statute Law Revision Act 1861 (24 & 25 Vict. c. 101))
Smuggling Act 1807 (repealed)	47 Geo. 3 Sess. 2. c. 66	13 August 1807
An Act to make more effectual Provision for the Prevention of Smuggling. (Repealed by Customs Law Repeal Act 1825 (6 Geo. 4. c. 105))
Importation (No. 5) Act 1807	47 Geo. 3 Sess. 2. c. 67	13 August 1807
An Act to permit until the End of the next Session of Parliament, the Importation of Swedish Herrings into Great Britain.
India Government, etc. Act 1807 (repealed)	47 Geo. 3 Sess. 2. c. 68	13 August 1807
An Act for the better Government of the Settlements of Fort Saint George and Bombay; for the Regulation of Publick Banks; and for amending so much of an Act, passed in the Thirty-third Year of His present Majesty, (Note: East India Company Act 1793 (33 Geo. 3. c. 52)) as relates to the Periods at which the Civil Servants of the East India Company may be employed in their Service Abroad. (Repealed by Statute Law Revision Act 1890 (53 & 54 Vict. c. 33))
General de Lancey (Crown Claims) Act 1807	47 Geo. 3 Sess. 2. c. 69	13 August 1807
An Act for discharging from the Claims of the Crown certain Real and Personal Estates belonging to General De Lancey, late Barrack Master General, and vested in Trustees for Sale.
Royal Military Canal Act 1807	47 Geo. 3 Sess. 2. c. 70	13 August 1807
An Act for maintaining and preserving a Military Canal and Road, made from Shorncliff in the County of Kent, to Cliff End in the County of Sussex, and for regulating the taking of Rates and Tolls thereon.
Militia (Great Britain) (No. 2) Act 1807	47 Geo. 3 Sess. 2. c. 71	14 August 1807
An Act for the speedily completing the Militia of Great Britain, and increasing the same, under certain Limitations and Restrictions.
Treasury Bills (Ireland) (No. 2) Act 1807 (repealed)	47 Geo. 3 Sess. 2. c. 72	14 August 1807
An Act for raising the Sum of Five hundred thousand Pounds by Treasury Bills for the Service of Ireland for the Year One thousand eight hundred and seven. (Repealed by Statute Law Revision Act 1872 (No. 2) (35 & 36 Vict. c. 97))
Loans or Exchequer Bills (No. 4) Act 1807 (repealed)	47 Geo. 3 Sess. 2. c. 73	14 August 1807
An Act for enabling His Majesty to raise the Sum of Four millions five hundred thousand Pounds for the Service of Great Britain. (Repealed by Statute Law Revision Act 1872 (No. 2) (35 & 36 Vict. c. 97))
Debts of Traders Act 1807	47 Geo. 3 Sess. 2. c. 74	14 August 1807
An Act for more effectually securing the Payment of the Debts of Traders.
Benefices Act 1807	47 Geo. 3 Sess. 2. c. 75	14 August 1807
An Act for suspending the Operation of an Act of the Thirty-sixth Year of His present Majesty, (Note: Curates, etc. Act 1796 (36 Geo. 3. c. 83)) for the further Support and Maintenance of Curates within the Church of England, and for other Purposes in the said Act mentioned, so far as relates to the Avoidance of Benefices by the Incumbents thereof having accepted augmented Curacies.
Appropriation Act 1807 (repealed)	47 Geo. 3 Sess. 2. c. 76	14 August 1807
An Act for granting to His Majesty a certain Sum of Money out of the Consolidated Fund of Great Britain, and for applying certain Monies therein mentioned for the Service of the Year One thousand eight hundred and seven, and for further appropriating the Supplies granted in this Session of Parliament. (Repealed by Statute Law Revision Act 1872 (No. 2) (35 & 36 Vict. c. 97))
Crown Lands at Egham, Exchange King and David Jebb Act 1807 (repealed)	47 Geo. 3 Sess. 2. c. 77	14 August 1807
An Act for confirming Articles of Agreement for an Exchange of Lands between His Majesty and David Jebb Esquire, (Note: David Jebb.) in the Parish of Egham in the County of Surrey. (Repealed by Statute Law (Repeals) Act 1978 (c. 45))
Lord Powerscourt's Mansion Act 1807	47 Geo. 3 Sess. 2. c. 78	14 August 1807
An Act for vesting the capital Messuage, with the Appurtenances situate in William Street, in the City of Dublin, now or lately inhabited by the Right Honourable Lord Powerscourt, in His Majesty, His Heirs and Successors, and for applying the Purchase Money in Manner therein mentioned.

=== Local acts ===
Short title	Citation	Royal assent
Long title
Boston (Lincolnshire) Court of Requests Act 1807 (repealed)	47 Geo. 3 Sess. 2. c. i	25 July 1807
An Act for the more speedy and easy Recovery of Small Debts in the Borough and Parish of Boston and the Hundreds of Skirkbeck and Kirton (except the Parishes of Gosberton and Surfleet) in the County of Lincoln. (Repealed by County Courts Act 1846 (9 & 10 Vict. c. 95))
Folkestone Pier and Harbour Act 1807	47 Geo. 3 Sess. 2. c. ii	25 July 1807
An Act for constructing a Pier and Harbour at or near the Town of Folkestone in the County of Kent.
Leith Harbour Act 1807 (repealed)	47 Geo. 3 Sess. 2. c. iii	25 July 1807
An Act for enlarging the Powers of an Act, of the Thirty-ninth Year of His present Majesty, (Note: Leith Harbour Act 1799 (39 Geo. 3. c. xliv)) for amending Two Acts, of the Twenty-eighth (Note: Leith Harbour Act 1788 (28 Geo. 3. c. 58)) and Thirty-eighth (Note: Leith Harbour Act 1798 (38 Geo. 3. c. xix)) Years of His present Majesty, for enlarging and improving the Harbour of Leith, for making certain new Streets and Roads, and widening others adjacent to and connected with the said Harbour 25th July 1807 (Repealed by Leith Harbour and Docks Act 1875 (38 & 39 Vict. c. clx))
Perth County Offices Act 1807	47 Geo. 3 Sess. 2. c. iv	25 July 1807
An Act for creating a County Hall, and other Offices, for the County of Perth.
London Dock Company Act 1807 (repealed)	47 Geo. 3 Sess. 2. c. v	25 July 1807
An Act to enable the London Dock Company to purchase certain Water Works in the Parishes of Stratford, Westham, Bow, Bromley, Mile End, and Stepney, and other Parishes adjacent; and to amend the several Acts for making Wet Docks and other Works for the Accommodation of Shipping, Commerce, and Revenue, within the Port of London. (Repealed by London Docks Act 1828 (9 Geo. 4. c. cxvi))
Chester Castle Gaol and other Buildings Act 1807 (repealed)	47 Geo. 3 Sess. 2. c. vi	25 July 1807
An Act for amending and enlarging the Powers of an Act, passed in the Twenty-eighth Year of His present Majesty, (Note: Chester Improvement Act 1788 (28 Geo. 3. c. 82)) for taking down and rebuilding the Gaol of the Castle of Chester, the Prothonotary's Office, the Exchequer Record Rooms, and other Offices and Buildings adjoining or near to the said Gaol. (Repealed by Statute Law (Repeals) Act 2008 (c. 12))
Isle of Thanet Court of Requests Act 1807 (repealed)	47 Geo. 3 Sess. 2. c. vii	25 July 1807
An Act for the more easy and speedy Recovery of Small Debts within the Parishes of Saint John the Baptist, Saint Peter the Apostle and Birchington, and the Vill of Wood, in the Isle of Thanet, and County of Kent. (Repealed by County Courts Act 1846 (9 & 10 Vict. c. 95))
Windsor Improvement Act 1807 (repealed)	47 Geo. 3 Sess. 2. c. viii	25 July 1807
An Act to amend and enlarge the Powers of an Act, passed in the Ninth Year of His present Majesty, (Note: Streets (New Windsor) Act 1769 (9 Geo. 3. c. 10)) for the better paving, cleansing, lighting, and watching the Streets and Lanes in the Parish and Borough of New Windsor, in the County of Berks, and for preventing Nuisances therein. (Repealed by Ministry of Health Provisional Order Confirmation (New Windsor Extension) Act 1920 (10 & 11 Geo. 5. c. cxxxv))
Coventry and Oxford Canal Act 1807 (repealed)	47 Geo. 3 Sess. 2. c. ix	25 July 1807
An Act for amending several Acts, (Note: Oxford Canal Act 1769 (9 Geo. 3. c. 70)) (Note: Oxford Canal Act 1775 (15 Geo. 3. c. 9)) (Note: Oxford Canal Act 1786 (26 Geo. 3. c. 20)) (Note: Warwick and Napton Canal Act 1794 (34 Geo. 3. c. 38)) (Note: Coventry to Oxford Canal Act 1794 (34 Geo. 3. c. 103)) (Note: Warwick and Napton Canal Act 1796 (36 Geo. 3. c. 95)) (Note: Oxford Canal Act 1799 (39 Geo. 3. c. 5)) for making and maintaining a Navigable Canal from the Coventry Canal Navigation, to the City of Oxford. (Repealed by Oxford Canal Navigation Act 1829 (10 Geo. 4. c. xlviii))
Birmingham and Shenstone Road Act 1807 (repealed)	47 Geo. 3 Sess. 2. c. x	25 July 1807
An Act or making and maintaining a Road from Birmingham, in the County of Warwick, to join the Lichfield Turnpike Road, in the Parish of Shenstone, in the County of Stafford, and for making a Branch of Road to communicate therewith. (Repealed by Birmingham and Watford Gap Road Act 1826 (7 Geo. 4. c. xxii))
Roads and Bridges in Dumbarton Act 1807 (repealed)	47 Geo. 3 Sess. 2. c. xi	25 July 1807
An Act for repairing and maintaining certain Roads in the County of Dumbarton, and building Bridges thereon. (Repealed by Dumbarton Roads and Bridges Act 1828 (9 Geo. 4. c. lxxxii))
Roads in Salop., Denbigh and Merioneth Act 1807 (repealed)	47 Geo. 3 Sess. 2. c. xii	25 July 1807
An Act for the more effectually repairing certain Roads in the Counties of Salop, Denbigh, and Merioneth. (Repealed by Pool, Oswestry and Wrexham Roads Act 1820 (1 Geo. 4. c. xlv))
Roads from Percy's Cross and from Wooler (Northumberland) Act 1807 (repealed)	47 Geo. 3 Sess. 2. c. xiii	25 July 1807
An Act for making and maintaining Roads from Percy's Cross to Milfield Burn, and from Wooler to Bowsdon Burn, in the County of Northumberland. (Repealed by Roads from Percy's Cross and from Wooler (Northumberland) Act 1829 (10 Geo. 4. c. xxviii))
Beverley and Kexby Bridge Road (Yorkshire) Act 1807 (repealed)	47 Geo. 3 Sess. 2. c. xiv	25 July 1807
An Act for continuing the Term, and altering and enlarging the Powers of Two Acts, passed in the Fourth (Note: Beverley and Kexby Bridge Road Act 1764 (4 Geo. 3. c. 76)) and Twenty-fifth (Note: Beverley to Kexby Bridge Road Act 1785 (25 Geo. 3. c. 110)) Years of His present Majesty, for repairing and widening the Road from Beverley to Kexby Bridge, in the County of York. (Repealed by Beverley and Kexby Bridge Road (Yorkshire) Act 1828 (9 Geo. 4. c. lxxviii))
Road from Brampton to Longtown (Cumberland) Act 1807 (repealed)	47 Geo. 3 Sess. 2. c. xv	25 July 1807
An Act for amending and keeping in Repair the Road from Brampton to Longtown, in the County of Cumberland, and for erecting a Bridge over the River Line upon the said Road. (Repealed by Road from Brampton to Longtown Act 1829 (10 Geo. 4. c. lxxxii))
Chester Roads Act 1807 (repealed)	47 Geo. 3 Sess. 2. c. xvi	25 July 1807
An Act for continuing the Term, and altering and enlarging the Powers of an Act, passed in the Twenty-sixth Year of His present Majesty, (Note: Cheshire Roads Act 1786 (26 Geo. 3. c. 139)) for amending the Road from Flookersbrook Bridge to the South End of Wilderspool Causeway, and from the Town of Frodsham to Ashton Lane End, in the County of Chester, so far as respects the Chester District of the said Roads, and for extending the same from the present Termination thereof at Flookersbrook Bridge aforesaid, to the North End of Cow Lane Bridge, in the City of Chester, and for making a new Road from such proposed Extension of the said Road to the North End of Queen Street, in the same City. (Repealed by Chester and Ashton Lane End Road Act 1828 (9 Geo. 4. c. lxxi))
Road from Newton (Cheshire) and from Frodsham Act 1807 (repealed)	47 Geo. 3 Sess. 2. c. xvii	25 July 1807
An Act for continuing the Term, and altering and enlarging the Powers of an Act, passed in the Twenty-sixth Year of His present Majesty, for amending the Road from Flookersbrook Bridge, in the Township of Newton near Chester, to the South End of Wilderspool Causeway, and from Frodsham to Ashton Lane End, in the County of Chester, so far as relates to the Frodsham District of the same Road. (Repealed by Road from Frodsham to Appleton (Cheshire) Act 1827 (7 & 8 Geo. 4. c. lxii))
Road from Kipping's Cross, Goudhurst Gore and Underden Green Act 1807 (repealed)	47 Geo. 3 Sess. 2. c. xviii	25 July 1807
An Act for continuing the Term, and altering and enlarging the Powers of Two Acts, passed in the Fifth (Note: Kent Roads Act 1765 (5 Geo. 3. c. 63)) and Twenty-sixth (Note: Kent Roads (No. 2) Act 1786 (26 Geo. 3. c. 134)) Years of His present Majesty, for repairing the Roads from Kipping's Cross, in the Parish of Brenchley, in the County of Kent, to Wilsley Green, in the Parish of Cranbrooke, and from a Place near Goudhurst Gore to Stilebridge, and from Underden Green to Wanshutt's Green, in the County of Kent. (Repealed by Roads from Kipping's Cross, Goudhurst Gore and Underden Green Act 1828 (9 Geo. 4. c. xvi))
Road from Loughborough to Derby Bridge and Cavendish Bridge Act 1807 (repealed)	47 Geo. 3 Sess. 2. c. xix	25 July 1807
An Act for reviving, continuing, and enlarging the Powers of an Act, of the Seventeenth Year of His present Majesty, (Note: Leicester Roads Act 1777 (17 Geo. 3. c. 108)) for amending the Road from the South-east End of Loughborough, in the County of Leicester, to Derby Bridge, near the Rushes, and from thence to the South End of Cavendish Bridge, in the same County. (Repealed by Road from Loughborough to Cavendish Bridge Act 1827 (7 & 8 Geo. 4. c. lxxiv))
Perth Roads Act 1807 (repealed)	47 Geo. 3 Sess. 2. c. xx	25 July 1807
An Act for repairing, and keeping in Repair, several Roads in the County of Perth. (Repealed by Roads and Bridges in Perthshire Act 1811 (51 Geo. 3. c. cxcviii))
Tonbridge and Maidstone Road Act 1807	47 Geo. 3 Sess. 2. c. xxi	25 July 1807
An Act for continuing the Term, and altering and enlarging the Powers of several Acts, passed in the Fifth, (Note: Kent Roads (No. 2) Act 1765 (5 Geo. 3. c. 71)) Sixth, (Note: Kent Roads Act 1766 (6 Geo. 3. c. 91)) and Twenty-sixth (Note: Tonbridge to Maidstone Road Act 1786 (26 Geo. 3. c. 154)) Years of His present Majesty, for repairing and widening the Road from Tonbridge to Maidstone, and from Watt's Cross to Cowden, in the County of Kent, so far as they relate to the Road from Tonbridge to Maidstone.
Road from Wadhurst and from Pullen's Hill Act 1807 (repealed)	47 Geo. 3 Sess. 2. c. xxii	25 July 1807
An Act for continuing the Term, and altering and enlarging the Powers, of Two Acts, of the Fifth (Note: Sussex and Kent Roads Act 1765 (5 Geo. 3. c. 54)) and Twenty-sixth (Note: Sussex and Kent Roads Act 1786 (26 Geo. 3. c. 157)) Years of His present Majesty, for repairing the Road leading from Wadhurst, in the County of Sussex to the Turnpike Road at Lamberhurst Pound and Pallen's Hill, in the County of Kent, and from thence to West Farley Street, in the County of Kent. (Repealed by Road from Wadhurst and from Pullen's Hill Act 1828 (9 Geo. 4. c. xvii))
Stibbington-cum-Wandsford and Sibson Inclosures Act 1807	47 Geo. 3 Sess. 2. c. xxiii	25 July 1807
An Act for inclosing Lands in the Parish of Stibbington-cum-Wandesford, otherwise Wandsford, and the Hamlet of Sinfon, within the said Parish, in the Counties of Huntingdon and Northampton.
Longhoughton Inclosure Act 1807	47 Geo. 3 Sess. 2. c. xxiv	25 July 1807
An Act for inclosing Lands in the Parish of Longhoughton, in the County of Northumberland
Hunton Inclosure Act 1807	47 Geo. 3 Sess. 2. c. xxv	25 July 1807
An Act for inclosing Lands in the Manors and Township of Hunton, in the North Riding of the County of York.
Chew Moor Inclosure Act 1807	47 Geo. 3 Sess. 2. c. xxvi	25 July 1807
An Act for inclosing Chew Moor, in the Township of Lostock, in the Parish of Bolton in the Moors, in the County Palatine of Lancaster.
Warkworth and Lesbury Inclosures Act 1807	47 Geo. 3 Sess. 2. c. xxvii	25 July 1807
An Act for inclosing Lands in the Parishes of Warkworth and Lesbury, in the County of Northumberland.
Great Staughton and Graffham Inclosures Act 1807	47 Geo. 3 Sess. 2. c. xxviii	25 July 1807
An Act for inclosing Lands in the Parishes of Great Staughton and Graffham, in the County of Huntingdon.
Glasgow City Extension and Improvement Act 1807	47 Geo. 3 Sess. 2. c. xxix	1 August 1807
An Act for amending, rendering more effectual, and continuing Parts of an Act, of the Thirty-ninth and Fortieth Year of His present Majesty, (Note: Glasgow City Extension and Improvement Act 1800 (39 & 40 Geo. 3. c. lxxxviii)) for extending the Royalty of the City of Glasgow over certain adjacent Lands, for paving, lighting, and cleansing the Streets, and other Purposes in the said Act mentioned.
Christchurch (Middlesex) Poor Relief Act 1807 (repealed)	47 Geo. 3 Sess. 2. c. xxx	1 August 1807
An Act for the better Relief of the Poor of the Parish of Christchurch, in the County of Middlesex. (Repealed by London Government (Borough of Stepney) Order in Council 1901 (SR&O 1901/276))
Port of London Improvement and City Canal Act 1807 (repealed)	47 Geo. 3 Sess. 2. c. xxxi	1 August 1807
An Act to authorize the Advancement of further Sums of Money out of the Consolidated Fund to be applied in completing the Canal across the Isle of Dogs, and erecting other Works there, and for effecting other Improvements of the Port of London, in Execution of certain Acts already passed for those Purposes. (Repealed by Thames Conservancy Act 1894 (57 & 58 Vict. c. clxxxvii))
Cumberland County Court Act 1807 (repealed)	47 Geo. 3 Sess. 2. c. xxxii	1 August 1807
An Act to enable His Majesty to grant the Citadel and Walls of the City of Carlisle, and certain Grounds adjoining thereto, to the Justices of the Peace for the County of Cumberland, for building Courts of Justice for the said County, and for other Purposes relating thereto. (Repealed by Statute Law (Repeals) Act 2013 (c. 2))
Bristol Wharfage Act 1807	47 Geo. 3 Sess. 2. c. xxxiii	1 August 1807
An Act for ascertaining and establishing the Rates of Wharfage, Cranage, Plankage, Anchorage, and Moorage, to be received at the lawful Quays in the Port of Bristol; for the Regulation of the Cranekeepers in the said Port; and for the better Regulation of Pilots and Pilotage of Vessels navigating the Bristol Channel.
Kent County Rates, &c. Act 1807 (repealed)	47 Geo. 3 Sess. 2. c. xxxiv	1 August 1807
An Act for empowering the Justices of the Peace for the County of Kent, to make a fair and equal County Rate for the said County, and provide convenient Court Houses for holding the Assizes and General Quarter Sessions of the Peace, and other Publick Meetings, within the said County. (Repealed by County of Kent Act 1981 (c. xviii))
Aberayron Harbour Act 1807 (repealed)	47 Geo. 3 Sess. 2. c. xxxv	1 August 1807
An Act to enable the Reverend Alban Thomas Jones Gwynne, his Heirs and Assigns, to repair and enlarge, or rebuild the Quay or Pier within the Harbour or Port of Aberayron, in the County of Cardigan, and to improve the said Harbour, and to regulate the Moorings of Ships and Vessels therein. (Repealed by Aberayron Harbour Order 1956 (SI 1956/2114))
Madocks' Estate Act 1807	47 Geo. 3 Sess. 2. c. xxxvi	1 August 1807
An Act to enable His Majesty to vest the Sands of Traeth Mawr, dividing the Counties of Carnarvon and Merioneth, in William Alexander Madocks Esquire.
Loyne or Lune River Navigation and Lancaster Quay Act 1807 (repealed)	47 Geo. 3 Sess. 2. c. xxxvii	1 August 1807
An Act to explain, amend, and render more effectual, several Acts, (Note: River Lune Navigation Act 1749 (23 Geo. 2. c. 12)) (Note: River Lune Navigation Act 1772 (12 Geo. 3. c. 81)) (Note: River Lune Navigation Act 1789 (29 Geo. 3. c. 39)) for improving the Navigation of the River Loyne, otherwise Lune, and for building a Quay or Wharf near Lancaster, in the County Palatine of Lancaster. (Repealed by Lancaster Port Commission Revision Order 1967 (SI 1968/532))
St. Botolph Aldgate and East Smithfield Improvement Act 1807 (repealed)	47 Geo. 3 Sess. 2. c. xxxviii	1 August 1807
An Act for more effectually paving the Streets, and other Places, within that Part of the Parish of Saint Botolph Aldgate, which lies in the County of Middlesex, and Part of a Street called East Smithfield, in the Precinct of Saint Catherine, and for cleansing, lighting, and watching the same, and for preventing Annoyances therein. (Repealed by London Government (Borough of Stepney) Order in Council 1901 (SR&O 1901/276))
Bradford (Wiltshire), &c. Court of Requests Act 1807 (repealed)	47 Geo. 3 Sess. 2. c. xxxix	1 August 1807
An Act to amend an Act, of the Third Year of His present Majesty, (Note: Small Debts (Wiltshire) Act 1763 (3 Geo. 3. c. 19)) for the more easy and speedy Recovery of Small Debts, in the Hundreds of Bradford, Melksham, and Whorlsdown, in the County of Wilts, and for extending the Powers of the said Act to other Places in the said County. (Repealed by County Courts Act 1846 (9 & 10 Vict. c. 95))
Gravesend, &c. Court of Requests Act 1807 (repealed)	47 Geo. 3 Sess. 2. c. xl	1 August 1807
An Act for the more easy and speedy Recovery of Small Debts within the Town of Gravesend and the Hundreds of Toltingtrough, Dartford, Wilmington, and Axtane, in the County of Kent. (Repealed by County Courts Act 1846 (9 & 10 Vict. c. 95))
Burntisland Two Pennies Scots Act 1807 (repealed)	47 Geo. 3 Sess. 2. c. xli	1 August 1807
An Act for continuing Three Acts, of the Sixth Year of King George the First, (Note: Bruntisland Beer Duties Act 1719 (6 Geo. 1. c. 8)) in the Twentieth Year of King George the Second, (Note: Bruntisland Beer Duties Act 1746 (20 Geo. 2. c. 26)) and in the Seventeenth Year of His present Majesty, (Note: Burntisland Beer Duties Act 1776 (17 Geo. 3. c. 20)) for laying a Duty of Two Pennies Scots, or One sixth Fart of a Penny Sterling, upon every Scots Pint of Beer or Ale vended or sold within the Town of Burntisland, and Liberties thereof, in the County of Fife, and for increasing the Publick Revenue of the said Town. (Repealed by Statute Law (Repeals) Act 2013 (c. 2))
Kinghorn Two Pennies Scots Act 1807 (repealed)	47 Geo. 3 Sess. 2. c. xlii	1 August 1807
An Act to revive and continue the Term and enlarge the Powers of Two Acts, of the Twenty-second Year of His late Majesty, (Note: Kinghorn Beer Duties Act 1748 (22 Geo. 2. c. 13)) and the Fourteenth Year of His present Majesty, (Note: Kinghorn Beer Duties Act 1774 (14 Geo. 3. c. 28)) for laying a Duty of Two Pennies Scots, or One sixth Part of a Penny Sterling, upon every Scots Pint of Ale or Beer brewed for Sale, brought into, tapped, or sold in the Burgh of Kinghorn, in the County of Fife. (Repealed by Statute Law (Repeals) Act 2013 (c. 2))
Culham Bridge Act 1807	47 Geo. 3 Sess. 2. c. xliii	1 August 1807
An Act for building a Bridge over the River Thames, from the Parish of Sutton Courtney, in the County of Berks, to the Parish of Culham, in the County of Oxford.
Birmingham Theatre Act 1807	47 Geo. 3 Sess. 2. c. xliv	1 August 1807
An Act to enable His Majesty, His Heirs and Successors, to grant Letters Patent for establishing a Theatre or Play-house, under certain Restrictions, in the Town of Birmingham, in the County of Warwick.
Lanarkshire Roads and Statute Labour and Clyde Bridge at Howford Act 1807	47 Geo. 3 Sess. 2. c. xlv	1 August 1807
An Act for amending an Act of the Twelfth Year of His present Majesty, (Note: Lanark Roads Act 1772 (12 Geo. 3. c. 82)) for repairing and widening several Roads through the County of Lanark, and for building a Bridge over the River Clyde, at or near a Place called The Howford, in the said County; and for making more effectual, and converting, the Statute Labour within the said County; and for repairing and regulating the Roads within the same.
Heage and Tibshelf Roads and Higham Branch (Derbyshire) Act 1807 (repealed)	47 Geo. 3 Sess. 2. c. xlvi	1 August 1807
An Act to continue the Term, and alter and enlarge the Powers of an Act of the Twenty-sixth Year of His present Majesty, for repairing and widening the Road from Heage, in the County of Derby, through Alfreton to Tibshelf, and a Branch from the same Road, at or near Shirland Lodge, to Higham, in the same County. (Repealed by Alfreton and Higham and Tibshelf Roads (Derbyshire) Act 1829 (10 Geo. 4. c. lxv))
Roads from Brighton to Lovell Heath Act 1807 (repealed)	47 Geo. 3 Sess. 2. c. xlvii	1 August 1807
An Act for continuing the Term, and enlarging the Powers of Two Acts of the Tenth (Note: Roads from Brighton to Lovell Heath Act 1770 (10 Geo. 3. c. 95)) and Thirty-first (Note: Roads from Brighton to Lovell Heath Act 1791 (31 Geo. 3. c. 118)) Years of His present Majesty, for repairing the Roads from Brighthelmston (Note: Brighthelmston is now known as Brighton.) to Lovell Heath, in the County of Sussex, and for amending a certain Piece of Road to communicate therewith. (Repealed by Roads from Brighton and from Austy Cross Act 1825 (6 Geo. 4. c. xxxix))
Road from Great Grimsby Haven Act 1807 (repealed)	47 Geo. 3 Sess. 2. c. xlviii	1 August 1807
An Act for continuing and amending Two Acts of the Fifth (Note: Lincoln Roads Act 1765 (5 Geo. 3. c. 73)) and Twenty-sixth (Note: Lincoln Roads Act 1786 (26 Geo. 3. c. 137)) Years of His present Majesty, for repairing the Road from Great Grimsby Haven, at or near Upper Sand End, to Wold Newton Church, and from Nun's Farm to the Mill Field, in the Parish of Irby, in the County of Lincoln. (Repealed by Road from Great Grimsby Haven to Irby Act 1828 (9 Geo. 4. c. lxviii))
Ipswich to South Town Road Act 1807 (repealed)	47 Geo. 3 Sess. 2. c. xlix	1 August 1807
An Act to revive and continue the Term and Powers of an Act of the Twenty-fifth Year of His present Majesty, (Note: Ipswich to South Town Road Act 1785 (25 Geo. 3. c. 116)) for amending the Road from Ipswich to South Town, and from the said Road at Beech Lane, in the Parish of Darsham, to Bungay, in the County of Suffolk. (Repealed by Road from Ipswich to Southtown and to Bungay Act 1828 (9 Geo. 4. c. xlv))
Bedford Level (Mildenhall River) Drainage Act 1807	47 Geo. 3 Sess. 2. c. l	1 August 1807
An Act to amend, and render more effectual, so much of an Act of the Thirty-third Year of His late Majesty, (Note: Isle of Ely, Suffolk, Norfolk Drainage Act 1759 (33 Geo. 2. c. 32)) for draining certain Fen Lands in the Isle of Ely, and Counties of Suffolk and Norfolk, near Mildenhall River, and empowering the Conservators of Bedford Level to sell certain Fen Lands, as relates to the Lands in the Second District described in the said Act.
Rochdale, Bamford, Birtle and Bury Road Act 1807 (repealed)	47 Geo. 3 Sess. 2. c. li	1 August 1807
An Act to continue the Term, and alter and enlarge the Powers of an Act of the Thirty-seventh Year of His present Majesty, (Note: Rochdale and Bury Road Act 1797 (37 Geo. 3. c. 145)) for amending and keeping in Repair the Road from Rochdale through Bamford and Birtle to Bury, and for making Three Branches of Road therefrom, in the County of Lancaster. (Repealed by Rochdale, Bamford, Birtle and Bury Road Act 1827 (7 & 8 Geo. 4. c. lxiii))
Roads from Chatteris Ferry to Wisbech Act 1807 (repealed)	47 Geo. 3 Sess. 2. c. lii	1 August 1807
An Act to continue and amend Three Acts, passed in the Fifth, (Note: Norfolk Roads Act 1765 (5 Geo. 3. c. 83)) Seventh, (Note: Isle of Ely and Norfolk Roads Act 1766 (7 Geo. 3. c. 100)) and Twenty-sixth (Note: Wisbeach Roads Act 1786 (26 Geo. 3. c. 133)) Years of His present Majesty, for repairing certain Roads therein mentioned, leading from Chatteris Ferry (Note: Chatteris Ferry, on the Chatteris Road. 52°25′47″N 0°01′59″E) to the Town of Wisbech Saint Peter's, (Note: Wisbech, Cambridgeshire.) in the Isle of Ely, and other Places in the said Acts mentioned. (Repealed by Chatteris Ferry and Downham Bridge Road Act 1828 (9 Geo. 4. c. lxxiii))
Penryn and Redruth Roads Act 1807 (repealed)	47 Geo. 3 Sess. 2. c. liii	1 August 1807
An Act to revive and continue the Term and Powers of Two Acts, of the Third (Note: Penryn and Redruth Roads Act 1763 (3 Geo. 3. c. 52)) and Twenty-fifth (Note: Penryn and Redruth Roads Act 1785 (25 Geo. 3. c. 114)) Years of His present Majesty, for amending the Roads from Penryn, in the County of Cornwall, to Redruth, in the same County. (Repealed by Penryn and Redruth Roads Act 1827 (7 & 8 Geo. 4. c. xviii))
Roads from Cambridge to Long Leys and to Royston Act 1807 (repealed)	47 Geo. 3 Sess. 2. c. liv	1 August 1807
An Act for continuing the Term, and altering and enlarging the Powers of an Act of the Thirty-third Year of His present Majesty, (Note: Cambridge to Royston Road Act 1793 (33 Geo. 3. c. 130)) for repairing the Roads from Cambridge to a Place called Long Leys, and from Cambridge to Royston, in the Counties of Cambridge and Essex. (Repealed by Roads from Cambridge to Chishill and to Royston Act 1828 (9 Geo. 4. c. xxxvi))
Hursley, Newbury and Chilton Road Act 1807 (repealed)	47 Geo. 3 Sess. 2. c. lv	1 August 1807
An Act to continue the Term, and alter and enlarge the Powers of Two Acts, of the Sixth (Note: Hants and Berkshire Roads Act 1766 (6 Geo. 3. c. 86)) and Twenty-seventh (Note: Southampton and Berkshire Roads Act 1787 (27 Geo. 3. c. 94)) Years of His present Majesty, for repairing and amending the Road from the present Turnpike Road, in the Parish of Hurley, in the County of Southampton, through the Borough of Andover to the Town of Newbury in the County of Berks, and from Newbury to Chilton Pond and Newtown River. (Repealed by Hursley and Chilton Pond Turnpike Road Act 1828 (9 Geo. 4. c. xlvii))
Swathling, Botley and Sherril Heath Road (Hampshire) Act 1807 (repealed)	47 Geo. 3 Sess. 2. c. lvi	1 August 1807
An Act for continuing the Term, and altering and enlarging Powers of Two Acts, of the Fifth (Note: Hants Roads Act 1765 (5 Geo. 3. c. 95)) and Twenty-sixth (Note: Southampton Roads Act 1786 (26 Geo. 3. c. 158)) Years of present Majesty, so far as the same relate to the Road leading the River at Swathling, through Botley, to the Turnpike Road Sherril Heath, in the County of Southampton. (Repealed by Swathling, Botley and Sherril Heath Road (Hampshire) Act 1829 (10 Geo. 4. c. lxxxi))
Earl of Bristol's Estate Act 1807	47 Geo. 3 Sess. 2. c. lvii	1 August 1807
An Act for vesting several Manors and Hereditaments in the Counties of Lincoln, Suffolk, and Essex, Parts of the Settled Estates of the Right Honourable Frederick William Earl of Bristol in Trustees, upon Trust to sell, and for laying out the Monies arising from such Sales in the Purchase of more convenient Estates, and for other Purposes therein mentioned.
Earl of Chesterfield's Estate Act 1807	47 Geo. 3 Sess. 2. c. lviii	1 August 1807
An Act for vesting Part of the Settled Estates of the Right Honourable Philip Earl of Chesterfield, in Trustees, in Trust to be sold, and for laying out the Monies arising from such Sales in the Purchase of other Estates, to be settled to the same Uses.
West's Estate Act 1807	47 Geo. 3 Sess. 2. c. lix	1 August 1807
An Act to enable Henrietta West Spinster, and James West Esquire, and their Lessee for the Time being, to grant Building Leases of certain Lands (devised by the Will of Sarah West deceased) in the Parish of Saint Mary Magdalen Bermondsey, in the County of Surrey.
Foster and Graham Estates Act 1807	47 Geo. 3 Sess. 2. c. lx	1 August 1807
An Act for vesting certain Estates of Mary Foster and George Edward Graham Esquire, and Mary his Wife, in King's Lynn and South Lynn, in the County of Norfolk, in Trustees, upon Trust to sell the same and to stand possessed of the Monies arising from the Sale thereof, upon the Trusts therein mentioned.
Shireoaks Chapel, Worksop, Right of Patronage Act 1807	47 Geo. 3 Sess. 2. c. lxi	1 August 1807
An Act for settling the Right of Patronage or Presentation of or to a Chapel, to be called Shireoaks Chapel, in the Parish of Worksop, in the County of Nottingham.
Rhûddlan, St. Asaph, Diserth and Cwn Inclosures Act 1807	47 Geo. 3 Sess. 2. c. lxii	1 August 1807
An Act for inclosing Lands in the Parishes of Rhûddlan, Saint Asaph, Diserth, and Cwm in the County of Flint.
Thorpe Inclosure Act 1807	47 Geo. 3 Sess. 2. c. lxiii	1 August 1807
An Act for inclosing the Lands of Thorpe in the County of Surrey.
Wheston and Tideswell Inclosures Act 1807	47 Geo. 3 Sess. 2. c. lxiv	1 August 1807
An Act for inclosing Lands in the Townships of Wheston and Tideswell, and in the Manor of Tideswell, in the County of Derby.
Bramham Inclosure Act 1807	47 Geo. 3 Sess. 2. c. lxv	1 August 1807
An Act for inclosing Lands in the Manor and Township of Bramham, in the West Riding of the County of York.
Shipdham Inclosure Act 1807	47 Geo. 3 Sess. 2. c. lxvi	1 August 1807
An Act for inclosing Lands in the Parish of Shipdham, in the County of Norfolk.
Westminster Court House Act 1807 (repealed)	47 Geo. 3 Sess. 2. c. lxvii	8 August 1807
An Act to amend Three Acts of the Eighteenth, (Note: Westminster (Improvement) Act 1778 (18 Geo. 3. c. 72)) Thirty-ninth, (Note: Westminster Court House Act 1799 (39 Geo. 3. c. lxxxii)) and Forty-fourth (Note: Sessions Houses, Westminster, etc. Act 1804 (44 Geo. 3. c. 61)) Years of His present Majesty for erecting a Court House, for the holding of Sessions of the Peace in the City of Westminster. (Repealed by Statute Law (Repeals) Act 2008 (c. 12))
London, Westminster, Middlesex, Surrey, Kent and Essex Coal Trade Act 1807	47 Geo. 3 Sess. 2. c. lxviii	8 August 1807
An Act for repealing the several Acts for regulating the Vend and Delivery of Coals within the Cities of London and Westminster and Liberties thereof, and in certain Parts of the Counties of Middlesex, Surry, Kent, and Essex; and for making better Provision for the same.
Dover Harbour Act 1807 (repealed)	47 Geo. 3 Sess. 2. c. lxix	8 August 1807
An Act for enlarging the Term and altering the Powers of several Acts (Note: Dover Harbour Act 1698 (11 Will. 3. c. 5)) (Note: Dover Harbour Act 1703 (2 & 3 Ann. c. 7)) (Note: Dover Harbour Act 1717 (4 Geo. 1. c. 13)) (Note: Dover Harbour Act 1722 (9 Geo. 1. c. 30)) (Note: Dover Harbour Act 1757 (31 Geo. 2. c. 8)) (Note: Dover Harbour Act 1786 (26 Geo. 3. c. 11)) for the Maintenance and Repair of the Harbour of Dover, in the County of Kent. (Repealed by Dover Harbour Act 1828 (9 Geo. 4. c. xxxi))
Thames and Medway Rivers Pilotage Act 1807	47 Geo. 3 Sess. 2. c. lxx	8 August 1807
An Act to revive and continue for Seven Years, and from thence to the End of the then next Session of Parliament, so much of several Acts (Note: Pilotage Act 1716 (3 Geo. 1. c. 13)) (Note: Trade to East Indies, etc. Act 1720 (7 Geo. 1. St. 1. c. 21)) (Note: Continuance of Laws, etc. Act 1723 (10 Geo. 1. c. 17)) (Note: Continuance of Laws (No. 2) Act 1734 (8 Geo. 2. c. 21)) (Note: Continuance of Laws, etc. Act 1749 (23 Geo. 2. c. 26)) (Note: Continuance of Laws (No. 2) Act 1763 (4 Geo. 3. c. 12)) (Note: Continuance of Laws Act 1778 (18 Geo. 3. c. 45)) (Note: Continuance of Laws Act 1792 (32 Geo. 3. c. 36)) passed as relate to the better regulating of Pilots for conducting Ships and Vessels from Dover, Deal, and the Isle of Thanet, up the Rivers of Thames and Medway.
Ynys Congor Harbour Act 1807	47 Geo. 3 Sess. 2. c. lxxi	8 August 1807
An Act for the Improvement of the Harbour of Ynys Congor, situated on the Coast of Efionedd in the County of Carnarvon.
East London Waterworks Act 1807	47 Geo. 3 Sess. 2. c. lxxii	8 August 1807
An Act for better supplying with Water the Inhabitants of the Parishes of Stratford Bow, otherwise Stratford le Bow, Saint John Hackney, Saint Mary Islington, Saint Matthew Bethnell Green, and several other Parishes, Hamlets, Townships, and Places adjacent or near thereunto, in the Counties of Middlesex and Essex.
Cosford and Polstead Poor Relief Act 1807 (repealed)	47 Geo. 3 Sess. 2. c. lxxiii	8 August 1807
An Act to alter, amend, and render more effectual, an Act, passed in the Nineteenth Year of His present Majesty, (Note: Cosford, Suffolk (Poor Relief) Act 1779 (19 Geo. 3. c. 30)) for the better Relief and Employment of the Poor of the several Parishes with the Hundred of Cosford, except the Parish of Hadleigh, and also the Parish of Polstead, within the Hundred of Babergh, in the County of Suffolk. (Repealed by Statute Law (Repeals) Act 2013 (c. 2))
Dublin (South and West) Improvement Act 1807	47 Geo. 3 Sess. 2. c. lxxiv	8 August 1807
An Act for improving, and rendering more commodious, such Part of the County and County of the City of Dublin, as is situate on the South Side of the River Anna Liffey and West of His Majesty's Castle of Dublin and for the Appointment of an Inspector of the Presentments and other Accounts of the County of the City aforesaid.
Limerick Improvement Act 1807 (repealed)	47 Geo. 3 Sess. 2. c. lxxv	8 August 1807
An Act for paving, cleansing, lighting, and watching the Parish of Saint Michael in the Liberties of the City of Limerick, and adjoining the said City, and for preventing and removing the Nuisances therein. (Repealed by Limerick Improvement Act 1853 (16 & 17 Vict. c. cxciv))
Wallsend Parish Church Act 1807	47 Geo. 3 Sess. 2. c. lxxvi	8 August 1807
An Act for taking down the present Church, and providing a new Church and Church-yard, in the Parish of Wallsend, in the County of Northumberland, and for rendering valid certain Marriages solemnized in the said Parish while the present Church has been in a State of Decay.
Standard Hill, Nottingham, Chapel Act 1807	47 Geo. 3 Sess. 2. c. lxxvii	8 August 1807
An Act for erecting a Chapel on certain extra parochial Land called Standard Hill, near the Town of Nottingham.
Bolingbroke, &c. Court of Requests Act 1807 (repealed)	47 Geo. 3 Sess. 2. c. lxxviii	8 August 1807
An Act for the more speedy and easy Recovery of Small Debts in the Soakes of Bolingbrooke and Horncastle and other Places in the County of Lincoln. (Repealed by County Courts Act 1846 (9 & 10 Vict. c. 95))
Ipswich Court of Requests Act 1807 (repealed)	47 Geo. 3 Sess. 2. c. lxxix	8 August 1807
An Act for the more easy and speedy Recovery of Small Debts in the Town and Borough of Ipswich, in the County of Suffolk. (Repealed by County Courts Act 1846 (9 & 10 Vict. c. 95))
Grand Surrey Canal Act 1807 (repealed)	47 Geo. 3 Sess. 2. c. lxxx	8 August 1807
An Act to enable the Company of Proprietors of the Grand Surrey Canal to complete the same. (Repealed by Grand Surrey Docks and Canal Act 1855 (18 & 19 Vict. c. cxxxiv))
Rochdale Canal Act 1807	47 Geo. 3 Sess. 2. c. lxxxi	8 August 1807
An Act to alter amend explain and enlarge the Powers of the Acts passed for making and maintaining the Rochdale Canal Navigation.
Weaver Navigation Act 1807	47 Geo. 3 Sess. 2. c. lxxxii	8 August 1807
An Act to authorize the Trustees of the River Weaver Navigation to open a more convenient Communication between the said River near Frodsham Bridge and the River Mersey, near Weston Point, in the Township of Weston in the County of Chester, and to amend Two Acts (Note: River Weaver Navigation Act 1720 (7 Geo. 1. St. 1. c. 10)) (Note: River Weaver Navigation Act 1759 (33 Geo. 2. c. 49)) relative to the said River.
Isle of Ely (Mildenhall River) Drainage Act 1807	47 Geo. 3 Sess. 2. c. lxxxiii	8 August 1807
An Act for repealing several Acts, of the Thirty-third Year of King George the Second, and the Thirteenth (Note: Isle of Ely, etc. (Drainage) (No. 2) Act 1772 (13 Geo. 3. c. 20)) and Thirty-seventh (Note: Burnt Fen (Northampton) Drainage Act 1797 (37 Geo. 3. c. 89)) Years of His present Majesty, for draining certain Fen Lands in the Isle of Ely, and Counties of Suffolk and Norfolk, near Mildenhall River, so far as relates to the several Lands in the First District therein described, and for making better Provision for draining and preserving the said Lands.
Chichester Improvements and Markets Act 1807	47 Geo. 3 Sess. 2. c. lxxxiv	8 August 1807
An Act to regulate and improve the Cattle Market, to provide a Market House, and establish a Market for the Sale of Butcher's Meat and other Articles, and to make other Improvements, within the City of Chichester, in the County of Sussex.
Burgh and Parochial Schoolmasters' (Scotland) Fund Act 1807 (repealed)	47 Geo. 3 Sess. 2. c. lxxxv	8 August 1807
An Act for raising and securing a Fund for the Relief of Widows Children of Burgh and Parochial School-masters in Scotland. (Repealed by Schoolmasters' Widows' and Children's Relief Fund (Scotland) Act 1843 (6 & 7 Vict. c. xxv))
Albion Fire and Life Insurance Company (No. 2) Act 1807	47 Geo. 3 Sess. 2. c. lxxxvi	8 August 1807
An Act to explain an Act, of the Forty-seventh Year of His present Majesty, (Note: Albion Fire and Life Insurance Company Act 1807 (47 Geo. 3 Sess. 1. c. xxxi)) for enabling the Albion Fire and Life Insurance Company to sue in the Name of their Secretary, and to inrol Annuities.
Globe Insurance Company (No. 2) Act 1807	47 Geo. 3 Sess. 2. c. lxxxvii	8 August 1807
An Act to explain an Act, of the Forty-seventh Year of His present Majesty, (Note: Globe Insurance Company Act 1807 (47 Geo. 3 Sess. 1. c. xxx)) for enabling the Globe Insurance Company to sue in the Name of their Treasurer, and to inrol Annuities.
Pelican Life Insurance Company (No. 2) Act 1807 (repealed)	47 Geo. 3 Sess. 2. c. lxxxviii	8 August 1807
An Act to explain an Act, of the Forty-seventh Year of His present Majesty, (Note: Pelican Life Insurance Company Act 1807 (47 Geo. 3 Sess. 1. c. xxxiii)) for enabling the Pelican Life Insurance Company to sue in the Name of their Secretary, and to inrol Annuities. (Repealed by Pelican Life Insurance Company's Act 1891 (54 & 55 Vict. c. lxxx))
Llandilo to Lampeter Roads Act 1807 (repealed)	47 Geo. 3 Sess. 2. c. lxxxix	8 August 1807
An Act to continue and amend Two Acts, of the Fifth (Note: Carmarthen Roads Act 1765 (5 Geo. 3. c. 76)) and Twenty-sixth (Note: Carmarthen Roads Act 1786 (26 Geo. 3. c. 150)) Years of His present Majesty, for repairing several Roads leading from Llandilo to Lampeter, and other Places in the County of Carmarthen. (Repealed by Roads in Carmarthen Act 1828 (9 Geo. 4. c. lxxxi))
Whitby and Middleton Road Act 1807 (repealed)	47 Geo. 3 Sess. 2. c. xc	8 August 1807
An Act for continuing the Term, and altering and enlarging the Powers of Two Acts of the Fourth (Note: Yorkshire Roads (No. 2) Act 1764 (4 Geo. 3. c. 69)) and Twenty-fifth (Note: Whitby Roads Act 1785 (25 Geo. 3. c. 111)) Years of His present Majesty, for repairing and widening the Road from Whitby to Middleton, in the County of York. (Repealed by Whitby and Middleton Road Act 1827 (7 & 8 Geo. 4. c. liii))
Banbury and Lutterworth Road Act 1807 (repealed)	47 Geo. 3 Sess. 2. c. xci	8 August 1807
An Act for enlarging the Term and Powers of Two Acts, of the Fifth (Note: Banbury to Lutterworth Road Act 1765 (5 Geo. 3. c. 105)) and Twenty-fifth (Note: Banbury to Lutterworth Road Act 1785 (25 Geo. 3. c. 128)) Years of His present Majesty, for repairing the Road from Banbury, in the County of Oxford, through Daventry and Cottesbach, to Lutterworth, in the County of Leicester. (Repealed by Banbury and Lutterworth Road Act 1828 (9 Geo. 4. c. lxxxvi))
Wednesbury and Darlaston Lane Road Act 1807 (repealed)	47 Geo. 3 Sess. 2. c. xcii	8 August 1807
An Act for continuing the Term, and altering and enlarging the Powers, of Two Acts, of the Sixth (Note: Stafford Roads (No. 3) Act 1766 (6 Geo. 3. c. 95)) and Twenty-seventh (Note: Warwick Worcester and Stafford Roads Act 1787 (27 Geo. 3. c. 73)) Years of His present Majesty, for repairing the Road from High Bullen, in Wednesbury, to the further End of Darlaston Lane, and other Places therein named, in the County of Stafford. (Repealed by Bilston Turnpike Roads (Staffordshire) Act 1829 (10 Geo. 4. c. lxxvi))
Road from Birstall to Nunbrook and from Bradley Lane to Huddersfield Act 1807 (repealed)	47 Geo. 3 Sess. 2. c. xciii	8 August 1807
An Act for continuing the Term, and altering and enlarging the Powers, of Two Acts, of the Fifth (Note: Yorks Roads Act 1765 (5 Geo. 3. c. 72)) and Twenty-sixth (Note: Birstal to Huddersfield Roads Act 1786 (26 Geo. 3. c. 140)) Years of His present Majesty, for repairing the Road from Birstall (Note: Birstall, West Yorkshire.) to Nunbrook, (Note: The meeting point of the A62 and the A644 roads (the Dewsbury to Elland Turnpike), where the roads cross the Nun Brook. 53°41′10″N 1°43′35″W) and from Bradley Lane (Note: Bradley, Huddersfield.) to Huddersfield, (Note: Huddersfield, West Yorkshire.) in the County of York. (Repealed by Birstal and Huddersfield Roads Act 1828 (9 Geo. 4. c. lxxxiii))
Roads from Cranbrooke to Appledore Heath Act 1807 (repealed)	47 Geo. 3 Sess. 2. c. xciv	8 August 1807
An Act for continuing the Term, and altering and enlarging the Powers of several Acts (Note: Kent Roads Act 1762 (2 Geo. 3. c. 65)) (Note: Kent Roads (No. 3) Act 1769 (9 Geo. 3. c. 76)) (Note: Kent Roads (No. 2) Act 1785 (25 Geo. 3. c. 112)) for repairing the Roads from the Parish of Cranbrooke to Appledore Heath, and other Roads in the County of Kent. (Repealed by Road from Cranbrooke to Appledore Heath and Branches (Kent) Act 1829 (10 Geo. 4. c. lxxxviii))
Roads from Watt's Cross and from Sevenoaks Common Act 1807 (repealed)	47 Geo. 3 Sess. 2. c. xcv	8 August 1807
An Act to continue the Term, and alter and enlarge the Powers of so much of Three Acts of the Fifth, (Note: Kent Roads (No. 2) Act 1765 (5 Geo. 3. c. 71)) Ninth, (Note: Kent Roads (No. 5) Act 1769 (9 Geo. 3. c. 92)) and Twenty-sixth (Note: Kent Roads Act 1786 (26 Geo. 3. c. 132)) Years of His present Majesty, as relate to the Repair of the Road from Wat's Cross to Cowden, and the Roads from Sevenoaks Common to Crockhurst Hatch Corner, and Penshurst Town to Southborough, in the County of Kent. (Repealed by Roads from Watts Cross and from Sevenoaks Common Act 1828 (9 Geo. 4. c. cviii))
Newcastle-upon-Tyne to Carlisle Road Act 1807 (repealed)	47 Geo. 3 Sess. 2. c. xcvi	8 August 1807
An Act for continuing the Term, and altering and enlarging the Powers, of an Act, of the Twenty-sixth Year of His present Majesty, (Note: Newcastle to Carlisle Road Act 1786 (26 Geo. 3. c. 160)) for repairing so much of the Road from the Town of Newcastle-upon-Tyne to the City of Carlisle, as lies within the County of Northumberland. (Repealed by Newcastle-upon-Tyne and Carlisle Road (Northumberland District) Act 1828 (9 Geo. 4. c. lxxii))
Great Torrington Roads Act 1807 (repealed)	47 Geo. 3 Sess. 2. c. xcvii	8 August 1807
An Act for continuing the Term, and altering and enlarging the Powers, of Two Acts, of the Fifth (Note: Great Torrington Roads Act 1765 (5 Geo. 3. c. 58)) and Twenty-sixth (Note: Great Torrington Roads Act 1786 (26 Geo. 3. c. 128)) Years of His present Majesty, for repairing several Roads in and near Great Torrington, in the County of Devon. (Repealed by Great Torrington Roads Act 1824 (5 Geo. 4. c. lxxxi))
Earl of Abingdon's Estate Act 1807	47 Geo. 3 Sess. 2. c. xcviii	8 August 1807
An Act for vesting in new Trustees the Estates late of the Right Honourable Willoughby Earl of Abingdon, deceased, in the Counties of Wilts and Somerset, which have not been sold by virtue of certain Indentures of Lease and Release, dated respectively the Seventeenth and Eighteenth Days of July One thousand seven hundred and seventy-five.
Bentinck's Estate Act 1807	47 Geo. 3 Sess. 2. c. xcix	8 August 1807
An Act for enabling Rear Admiral Bentinck, Tenant for Life under the Will of his late Father John Albert Bentinck Esquire, deceased, to charge his Estates in the County of Norfolk with the Sums therein mentioned, for the embanking, improving, and increasing the same Estates by the Means therein mentioned.
Champneys' Estate Act 1807	47 Geo. 3 Sess. 2. c. c	8 August 1807
An Act for effecting the Sale of certain Real Estates, late of Henry Champneys Esquire, deceased, devised by his Will, or purchased in pursuance thereof, and for laying out the Money arising from the Sale thereof, under the Directions of the High Court of Chancery, in the Purchase of other Estates to be settled to the same Uses as the Estates so sold.
Harrison's Estate Act 1807	47 Geo. 3 Sess. 2. c. ci	8 August 1807
An Act for vesting certain Estates devised by the Will of James Harrison Esquire, deceased, situate in the Counties of Lancaster and Chester, in Trustees, in Trust to be sold for the Payment of Debts and Legacies affecting the same; and after Payment thereof, for the Investment of the Residue of the Monies to arise by such Sale in the Purchase of other Estates, to be settled to the same Uses as the Estates so fold
Riners' Estate Act 1807	47 Geo. 3 Sess. 2. c. cii	8 August 1807
An Act for enabling Francis Riners Esquire to grant Building and Repairing Leases of certain Lands in the Parish of Stebunheath, otherwise Stepney, in the County of Middlesex, devised by the Will of Francis Peete Esquire.
Hall's Estate Act 1807	47 Geo. 3 Sess. 2. c. ciii	8 August 1807
An Act for vesting certain Estates in the Parishes of Drypool and Sutton, in Holderness, in the County of York (Part of the Estates devised by the Will of Ann Hall, deceased), in Trustees in Trust to sell the same, and for laying out the Money arising from the Sale thereof in the Purchase of other Estates, to be settled to the same Uses as the Estates so sold.
Morden College and Bonar's Estate Act 1807	47 Geo. 3 Sess. 2. c. civ	8 August 1807
An Act for effecting an Exchange between the Trustees and Visitors of Morden College, in the Parish of Charlton, in the County of Kent, and Thompson Bonar, Esquire, of certain Lands and Hereditaments in the same County.
Ossett Inclosure Act 1807	47 Geo. 3 Sess. 2. c. cv	8 August 1807
An Act for inclosing Lands in the Township of Ossett, in the Parish of Dewsbury in the West Riding of the County of York.
Hurst Inclosure Act 1807	47 Geo. 3 Sess. 2. c. cvi	8 August 1807
An Act for inclosing Lands in the Parish of Hurst, in the Counties of Berks and Wilts.
Llanelly Inclosure and Town and Port Improvement Act 1807	47 Geo. 3 Sess. 2. c. cvii	8 August 1807
An Act for inclosing Lands in Llanelley, in the County of Caermarthen, and for leasing Part of the said Lands, and applying the Rents thereof in improving the Town and Port of Llanelly, in the said County.
Davers' Devisees' Annuity Act 1807	47 Geo. 3 Sess. 2. c. cviii	8 August 1807
An Act to enable His Majesty to release to the Devisees in Fee, in Trust of the Estates of Sir Charles Davers Baronet, deceased, an Annuity or Yearly Sum of Eight hundred Pounds, given by the Will of Mary Davers Spinster, to Francis Alexander Frederick de la Rochefoucauld de Liancourt, an Alien, and the Arrears thereof
Dublin Improvement Act 1807	47 Geo. 3 Sess. 2. c. cix	13 August 1807
An Act for the more effectual Improvement of the City of Dublin, and the Environs thereof.
Peterhead Harbour Act 1807 (repealed)	47 Geo. 3 Sess. 2. c. cx	13 August 1807
An Act for deepening, enlarging, maintaining, and improving the Harbour of Peterhead, in the County of Aberdeen. (Repealed by Peterhead Harbours Act 1827 (7 & 8 Geo. 4. c. xxxiv))
Woolwich Improvement Act 1807	47 Geo. 3 Sess. 2. c. cxi	13 August 1807
An Act for paving, cleansing, lighting, and watching the Town and Parish of Woolwich, in the County of Kent, and removing and preventing Nuisances therein, for the better Relief and Employment of the Poor, for providing an additional Burial Ground, and for regulating the Market of the said Town and Parish.
Galway County Gaol and Sessions House Act 1807	47 Geo. 3 Sess. 2. c. cxii	13 August 1807
Act to amend an Act, of the Forty-second Year of His present Majesty, (Note: Galway County Gaol Act 1802 (42 Geo. 3. c. xviii)) for building a new Gaol for the County of Galway, and other Purposes relating thereto; and for providing a new Sessions House for the said County.
Lancaster Canal Navigation Act 1807	47 Geo. 3 Sess. 2. c. cxiii	13 August 1807
An Act to enable the Company of Proprietors of the Lancaster Canal Navigation to vary the Course of the said Canal, and to make Railways or Roads, and to amend and render more effectual Two Acts relating to the said Navigation.
Newcastle-under-Lyme, Burslem, Whitmore, Bucknall and Bagnall, Norton-in-the-Moors and Stoke-upon-Trent Parish Churches Act 1807	47 Geo. 3 Sess. 2. c. cxiv	13 August 1807
An Act for separating the Chapelries and Chapels of Newcastle-under-Lyme, Burslem, Whitmore, Bucknall and Bagnall, and Norton in the Moors, from the Rectory and Parish Church of Stoke-upon-Trent, in the County of Stafford, and for making them Five distinct Rectories and Parish Churches; and for enabling the Rector of the said Parish Church of Stoke-upon-Trent for the Time being to grant Building Leases of certain Glebe Lands belonging to the said Rectory.
Surrey Roads Act 1807 (repealed)	47 Geo. 3 Sess. 2. c. cxv	13 August 1807
An Act for enlarging the Powers of an Act, of the Twenty-sixth Year of His present Majesty, (Note: South London Roads Act 1786 (26 Geo. 3. c. 131)) for making and keeping in Repair certain Roads in the Parishes of Lambeth, Newington, Saint George Southwark, Bermondsey, and Christ Church, in the County of Surrey, and for watching and lighting the said Roads. (Repealed by Surrey New Roads Act 1822 (3 Geo. 4. c. cxii))
Roads from Horsham and from Steyning Act 1807 (repealed)	47 Geo. 3 Sess. 2. c. cxvi	13 August 1807
An Act to continue the Term and enlarge the Powers of an Act (Note: Sussex Roads Act 1785 (25 Geo. 3. c. 109)) for repairing the Roads from Horsham to the Top of Beeding Hill, and from Steyning to the Top of Steyning Hill in the County of Sussex; and for making a Road from the said Roads in the Parish of Beeding, by Beeding Chalk Pit, to the North East Corner of the Sheep Field, in the Parish of Kingstone by Sea in the said County. (Repealed by Horsham and Steyning and Beeding Road Act 1828 (9 Geo. 4. c. lxx))
River Adur Navigation and Drainage Act 1807	47 Geo. 3 Sess. 2. c. cxvii	13 August 1807
An Act for improving the Navigation of a certain Part of the River Adur; and for the better draining the Low Lands lying in the Levels above Beeding Bridge. and below Mock Bridge and Bines Bridge. all in the County of Sussex.
Jones' Estate Act 1807	47 Geo. 3 Sess. 2. c. cxviii	13 August 1807
An Act for repealing an Act, made in the Thirty-eighth Year of the Reign of His present Majesty, intituled, "An Act for vesting certain Freehold and Copyhold Estates, devised by the Will of the late Arthur Jones Esquire, deceased, in the Counties of Kent, Nottingham, Carmarthen, Cardigan, and Middlesex, and in the Cities and Liberties of London and Westminster, in Trustees, to be sold, and for laying out the Monies to arise by such sale, together with the Sum of Fifty-three thousand three hundred and thirty-three Pounds Three Shillings and Four-pence, Three Pounds per Centum Consolidated Bank Annuities, standing in the Name of the Accomptant General of the High Court of Chancery, in Trust in a certain Cause in the said Court, Macnamara versus Jones, being the clear Residue of the Personal Estate of the said Testator Arthur Jones, in the Purchase of other Lands and Hereditaments to be settled to the same Uses, and for enabling the said Trustees to grant Leases of the Estates so to be purchased, and also to cut Timber growing thereupon, subject to Restrictions," (Note: Jones' Estate Act 1797 (38 Geo. 3. c. 45 Pr.)) so far as the Trusts thereof have not been performed and caried into Execution.
Lord Spencer's Estate Act 1807	47 Geo. 3 Sess. 2. c. cxix	13 August 1807
An Act for vesting in the Right Honourable Robert Spencer, commonly called Lord Robert Spencer, in Fee Simple; Part of his Settled Estates in the County of Sussex, in Exchange for another of the said Lord Robert Spencer, in the same County, and for settling such last-mentioned Estate to the like Uses as the said Part his Settled Estates stood settled.
Earl of Ely's Estate Act 1807	47 Geo. 3 Sess. 2. c. cxx	13 August 1807
An Act to enable the surviving Trustee named in the last Will and Testament of the late Right Honourable Henry Earl of Ely, deceased, to sell the Mansion House of the said late Earl, in Ely Place, in the City of Dublin, with the Appurtenances and the Furniture to the said House belonging, and the Glasses and Pictures therein; and to lay out the Monies to arise by such Sale in the Purchase of Lands and Hereditaments in Ireland, and to settle such Lands so to be purchased to the same Uses, and subject to the same Limitations, as are in the said Will declared and expressed with respect to the said Mansion House, with the Appurtenances.
Hamilton's Estate Act 1807	47 Geo. 3 Sess. 2. c. cxxi	13 August 1807
An Act for the Partition of divers Lands in the Counties of Monaghan, Fermanagh, Louth, and Armagh, late the Property of Sir James Hamilton Knight, deceased, and in which Catherine Hamilton, Dorothea Hawkshaw otherwise Hamilton, Maria Williamson otherwise Hamilton, Dacre Hamilton, Olivia Lucas otherwise Hamilton, Elizabeth Hamilton, the Reverend James Hamilton, Skeffington Hamilton, Elinor Hamilton, Frances Lee otherwise Hamilton, and the Representatives of Jane Hamilton, deceased, have undivided Shares, and for the Sale of the Lands therein mentioned.
Cooper's Estate Act 1807	47 Geo. 3 Sess. 2. c. cxxii	13 August 1807
An Act for confirming the Sales, made under the Directions of the Court of Chancery, of several Estates in the Counties of Surrey, Sussex, and Kent, devised by the Will of Thomas Cooper, deceased.
Henry's Estate Act 1807	47 Geo. 3 Sess. 2. c. cxxiii	13 August 1807
An Act for the Sale of Part of the Estate of John Joseph Henry Esquire, for the Intents and Purposes therein mentioned, and for settling other Estates in lieu thereof to the same Uses, and to extend the leasing Powers of the said John Joseph Henry in respect to Part of his Estates therein mentioned.
Inglis' Estate Act 1807	47 Geo. 3 Sess. 2. c. cxxiv	13 August 1807
An Act for vesting the Entirety of certain Settled Estates of Sir Hugh Inglis Baronet, John Watkins Parker Esquire, and Thomas Lloyd Esquire, and Eliza Bella his Wife, situate in the City of London and County of Middlesex, in Trustees, in Trust to carry into Execution a Contract already entered into for Sale of Part of the same Estates, and to sell the other Part thereof under the Directions of the Court of Chancery, and to apply the Money arising from the said Sales in the Manner therein mentioned.
Tipping's Estate Act 1807	47 Geo. 3 Sess. 2. c. cxxv	13 August 1807
An Act for vesting Part of the Estates, in the County of Berks, devised by the Will of Bartholomew Tipping Esquire, deceased, in Trustees, in Trust to sell the same, and for laying out the Money arising from the Sale thereof in the Purchase of other Estates, to be settled to the same Uses as the Estate so sold.
Bradshaw Fletcher's Estate Act 1807	47 Geo. 3 Sess. 2. c. cxxvi	13 August 1807
An Act for enabling Trustees to fell the Settled Estates of John Bradshaw Fletcher Esquire, (calling himself John Bradshaw), situate in the County of Essex, and for laying out the Monies to arise from the Sale thereof in the Purchase of Estates to be situate in or near the County of Lancaster, to be settled to the same Uses.
Colston's Almshouses, Bristol Act 1807	47 Geo. 3 Sess. 2. c. cxxvii	13 August 1807
An Act for vesting several Fee Farm Rents and annual Sums settled by Edward Colston, deceased, on the Master, Wardens, and Commonalty of Merchant Venturers of the City of Bristol, for the Maintenance of an Hospital and Alms-house in the said City, in Trustees to be sold, and for applying the Money to arise by such Sale in the Purchase of Lands and Hereditaments to be settled upon the Trusts on which such Fee Farm Rents and annual Sums are respectively held.
See of Canterbury's Estate Act 1807	47 Geo. 3 Sess. 2. c. cxxviii	13 August 1807
An Act for vesting certain Estates belonging to the See of Canterbury in Trustees for Sale, and for applying the Purchase Monies, together with other Monies, in the Manner therein mentioned, and for enabling the Archbishop of Canterbury to grant Building and Repairing Leases, and for other Purposes.
Avon River Horse Towing-path Act 1807	47 Geo. 3 Sess. 2. c. cxxix	14 August 1807
An Act for enabling the Proprietors of the Navigation of the River Avon, in the Counties of Somerset and Gloucester, from the City of Bath to or near Hanham's Mills, to make and maintain an Horse Towing-path, for the Purpose of towing and haling with Horses or otherwise, Boats, Lighters, and other Vessels, up and down the said River.
Ottringham in Holderness Draining and Embanking Act 1807	47 Geo. 3 Sess. 2. c. cxxx	14 August 1807
An Act for draining embarking and improving Lands in the Parish of Ottringham in Holderness, in the East Riding of the County of York.
Fourdriniers' Paper-Making Machine Act 1807	47 Geo. 3 Sess. 2. c. cxxxi	14 August 1807
An Act for prolonging the Term of certain Letters Patent assigned to Henry Fourdrinier and Sealy Fourdrinier, for the Invention of making Paper by means of Machinery.
St. George the Martyr, Southwark, Support of Rector Act 1807 (repealed)	47 Geo. 3 Sess. 2. c. cxxxii	14 August 1807
An Act for making better Provision for the Support and Maintenance of the Rector for the Time being of the Parish of Saint George the Martyr, Southwark, in the County of Surrey. (Repealed by St. George the Martyr, Southwark Act 1893 (c.xiv))
Roads from York and from Grimston Act 1807 (repealed)	47 Geo. 3 Sess. 2. c. cxxxiii	14 August 1807
An Act for more effectually repairing the Road from the City of York to Kexby Bridge, and from Grimston to the upper End of Stone Dale, in the County of York. (Repealed by Roads from York and from Grimston Act 1827 (7 & 8 Geo. 4. c. xcix))
Brandon Inclosure Act 1807	47 Geo. 3 Sess. 2. c. cxxxiv	14 August 1807
An Act for inclosing Lands in the Parish of Brandon, in the County of Suffolk.

=== Private acts ===
Short title	Citation	Royal assent
Long title
Wambrook Inclosure Act 1807	47 Geo. 3 Sess. 2. c. 1 Pr.	17 July 1807
An Act for enclosing Lands in the Parish of Warnbrook, in the County of Dorset.
Elton Inclosure Act 1807	47 Geo. 3 Sess. 2. c. 2 Pr.	17 July 1807
An Act for inclosing Lands in the Parish of Elton, in the County of Nottingham.
Cary's Naturalization Act 1807	47 Geo. 3 Sess. 2. c. 3 Pr.	17 July 1807
An Act for naturalizing Joseph Cary.
Sciard's Naturalization Act 1807	47 Geo. 3 Sess. 2. c. 4 Pr.	17 July 1807
An Act for naturalizing John Jacob Sicard.
Norton Lindsey Inclosure Act 1807	47 Geo. 3 Sess. 2. c. 5 Pr.	25 July 1807
An Act for inclosing Lands in the Hamlet of Upper Norton, otherwise Norton Lindsey, in the County of Warwick.
Warkton, &c. Inclosure Act 1807	47 Geo. 3 Sess. 2. c. 6 Pr.	25 July 1807
An Act for inclosing Lands in the Parishes of Warkton and Little Oakley, in the County of Northampton, and in the Parish of Luddington, in the Counties of Northampton and Huntingdon, or one of them.
Weekley, &c. Inclosure Act 1807	47 Geo. 3 Sess. 2. c. 7 Pr.	25 July 1807
An Act for inclosing Lands in the Parishes of Weekly and Geddington, in the County of Northampton, and for changing in Part the Boundary between the said Two Parishes.
Cattistock Inclosure Act 1807	47 Geo. 3 Sess. 2. c. 8 Pr.	25 July 1807
An Act for inclosing Lands in the Parish of Cattisstock, in the County of Dorset.
Stockland Inclosure Act 1807	47 Geo. 3 Sess. 2. c. 9 Pr.	25 July 1807
An Act for inclosing Lands in the Manor and Parish of Stockland, in the County of Dorset.
Alderton Inclosure Act 1807	47 Geo. 3 Sess. 2. c. 10 Pr.	25 July 1807
An Act for inclosing Lands in the Parish of Alderton, in the County of Gloucester.
Stanley-pont-Large Inclosure Act 1807	47 Geo. 3 Sess. 2. c. 11 Pr.	25 July 1807
An Act for inclosing Lands in the Parish of Stanley-pont-large, in the County of Gloucester.
Horning Inclosure Act 1807	47 Geo. 3 Sess. 2. c. 12 Pr.	25 July 1807
An Act for inclosing Lands in the Parish of Horning, in the County of Norfolk.
Waith Inclosure Act 1807	47 Geo. 3 Sess. 2. c. 13 Pr.	25 July 1807
An Act for inclosing Lands in the Parish of Waith, in the County of Lincoln.
Knockin Inclosure Act 1807	47 Geo. 3 Sess. 2. c. 14 Pr.	25 July 1807
An Act for inclosing Lands in the Manor of Knockin, in the County of Salop.
Aldington Inclosure Act 1807	47 Geo. 3 Sess. 2. c. 15 Pr.	25 July 1807
An Act for inclosing Lands in the Hamlet of Aldington, in the Parish of Badsey, in the County of Worcester.
North Weston Inclosure Act 1807	47 Geo. 3 Sess. 2. c. 16 Pr.	25 July 1807
An Act for inclosing Lands in the Parishes of North Weston, in Portishead, and Weston in Gordano, otherwise North Weston, in the County of Somerset.
Pentney Inclosure Act 1807	47 Geo. 3 Sess. 2. c. 17 Pr.	25 July 1807
An Act for inclosing Lands in the Parish of Pentney, in the County of Norfolk.
Herringswell Inclosure Act 1807	47 Geo. 3 Sess. 2. c. 18 Pr.	25 July 1807
An Act for dividing and allotting Lands in the Parish of Herringswell, in the County of Suffolk.
Holt and Letheringsett Inclosure Act 1807	47 Geo. 3 Sess. 2. c. 19 Pr.	25 July 1807
An Act for inclosing Lands in the Parishes of Holt and Letheringsett, in the County of Norfolk.
Burton Inclosure Act 1807	47 Geo. 3 Sess. 2. c. 20 Pr.	25 July 1807
An Act for inclosing Lands in the Manor and Township of Burton, in the Parish of Burton, in the County Palatine of Chester.
Warlingham Inclosure Act 1807	47 Geo. 3 Sess. 2. c. 21 Pr.	25 July 1807
An Act for inclosing Lands in the Parish of Warlingham, in the County of Surrey 22
South Kirkby and South Elmsall Inclosure Act 1807	47 Geo. 3 Sess. 2. c. 22 Pr.	25 July 1807
An Act for inclosing Lands in the Townships of South Kirkby and South Elmsall, in the Parish of South Kirkby, in the West Riding of the County of York.
Croughton Inclosure Act 1807	47 Geo. 3 Sess. 2. c. 23 Pr.	25 July 1807
An Act for inclosing Lands in the Parish of Croughton, otherwise Crouton, in the County of Northampton And for making Compensation for Tythes 24
Kingswood Inclosure Act 1807	47 Geo. 3 Sess. 2. c. 24 Pr.	25 July 1807
An Act for inclosing Lands in the Liberty of Kingswood, in the Parish of Ewell, in the County of Surrey.
Offley Inclosure Act 1807	47 Geo. 3 Sess. 2. c. 25 Pr.	25 July 1807
An Act for inclosing Lands in the Parish of Offley, in the County of Hertford.
Shottesbrook and White Waltham Inclosure Act 1807	47 Geo. 3 Sess. 2. c. 26 Pr.	25 July 1807
An Act for inclosing Lands in the Parishes of Shottesbrook and White Waltham, otherwise Waltham Abbots, in the County of Berks.
Hayton Inclosure Act 1807	47 Geo. 3 Sess. 2. c. 27 Pr.	25 July 1807
An Act for inclosing Lands in the Parish of Hayton in the County of Cumberland 28
North Hykeham and Skellingthorpe Inclosure Act 1807	47 Geo. 3 Sess. 2. c. 28 Pr.	25 July 1807
An Act for inclosing Lands in the Parishes of North Hykeham, otherwise North Hickham, and Skellingthorpe, in the County of Lincoln.
Wrangle Inclosure Act 1807	47 Geo. 3 Sess. 2. c. 29 Pr.	25 July 1807
An Act for inclosing Lands in the Parish of Wrangle, in the County of Lincoln.
Lady Kinnaird's Estate Act 1807	47 Geo. 3 Sess. 2. c. 30 Pr.	1 August 1807
An Act for vesting certain Estates at Ealing, in the County of Middlesex (devised by the Will of the Right Honourable Elizabeth Lady Kinnaird), in Trustees, upon Trust to sell the same, and for applying Part of the Purchase Monies in Discharge of an Incumbrance thereupon, and for laying out the Residue of the Monies in the Purchase of other Estates to be settled to the same Uses.
River Inclosure Act 1807	47 Geo. 3 Sess. 2. c. 31 Pr.	1 August 1807
An Act for inclosing Lands in the Parish of River, in the County of Kent.
Addle Inclosure Act 1807	47 Geo. 3 Sess. 2. c. 32 Pr.	1 August 1807
An Act for inclosing Lands in the Parish of Addle, in the West Riding of the County of York.
Hudswell and Hipswell Inclosure Act 1807	47 Geo. 3 Sess. 2. c. 33 Pr.	1 August 1807
An Act for inclosing Lands in Hudswell and Hipsowell, in the Parish of Catterick, in the North Riding of the County of York.
Ashby de la Laund Inclosure Act 1807	47 Geo. 3 Sess. 2. c. 34 Pr.	1 August 1807
An Act for inclosing Lands in the Parish of Ashby de la Laund, in the County of Lincoln.
Bishop Monckton Inclosure Act 1807	47 Geo. 3 Sess. 2. c. 35 Pr.	1 August 1807
An Act for inclosing Lands in the Township of Bishop Monkton, in the Parish of Ripon, in the County of York.
Pamington Inclosure Act 1807	47 Geo. 3 Sess. 2. c. 36 Pr.	1 August 1807
An Act for inclosing Lands in the Hamlet of Pamington, in the Parish of Ashchurch, in the County of Gloucester.
St. Clears Inclosure Act 1807	47 Geo. 3 Sess. 2. c. 37 Pr.	1 August 1807
An Act for inclosing Lands in the Manor, Town, Borough, and Liberty of Saint Clears, in the County of Carmarthen.
Mildenhall Inclosure Act 1807	47 Geo. 3 Sess. 2. c. 38 Pr.	1 August 1807
An Act for inclosing Lands in the Parish of Mildenhall, in the County of Suffolk.
Low Dunsforth Inclosure Act 1807	47 Geo. 3 Sess. 2. c. 39 Pr.	1 August 1807
An Act for inclosing Lands in the Township of Low Dunsforth, in the Parish of Aldborough, in the County of York.
Torpenhow Inclosure Act 1807	47 Geo. 3 Sess. 2. c. 40 Pr.	1 August 1807
An Act for inclosing Lands in the Parish of Torpenhow, in the County of Cumberland.
Fitton Inclosure Act 1807	47 Geo. 3 Sess. 2. c. 41 Pr.	1 August 1807
An Act for inclosing Lands in the Manor of Fitton in the Parish of Wiggenhall Saint Mary's, and other Parishes therein mentioned, in the County of Norfolk.
Sawtry Inclosure Act 1807	47 Geo. 3 Sess. 2. c. 42 Pr.	1 August 1807
An Act to explain and amend an Act of the Forty fourth Year of His present Majesty, (Note: Sawtry Inclosure Act 1804 (44 Geo. 3. c. 13 Pr.)) for dividing and draining Lands in the Parishes of Sawtry All Saints, and Sawtry Saint Andrew, in the County of Huntingdon.
Chrishall Inclosure Act 1807	47 Geo. 3 Sess. 2. c. 43 Pr.	1 August 1807
An Act for inclosing Lands in the Parish of Chrishall, in the County of Essex.
Deddington and Great Barford Inclosure Act 1807	47 Geo. 3 Sess. 2. c. 44 Pr.	1 August 1807
An Act for inclosing Lands in the Manors and Parishes of Deddington and Great Barford, otherwise Barford Saint Michael, in the County of Oxford.
Broughton Hackett Inclosure Act 1807	47 Geo. 3 Sess. 2. c. 45 Pr.	1 August 1807
An Act for inclosing Lands in the Parish of Broughton Hackett, otherwise Hacketts Broughton, in the County of Worcester.
Frebout's Naturalization Act 1807	47 Geo. 3 Sess. 2. c. 46 Pr.	1 August 1807
An Act for naturalizing Louis François Nicolas Frebout.
Sir John Morden's College Estate Act 1807	47 Geo. 3 Sess. 2. c. 47 Pr.	8 August 1807
An Act to empower the Trustees and Visitors of the College, commonly called Sir John Morden's College, situate on Blackheath, in the County of Kent, to sell a certain Piece or Parcel of Land, and other Hereditaments, situate at Greenwich, in the said County of Kent, Part of the Estate of the said College, to the Commissioners and Governors of the Royal Hospital for Seamen at Greenwich, in the County of Kent, and to apply the Money arising by such Sale in the Purchase of other Lands to be applied to the like Uses.
Damer's Estate Act 1807	47 Geo. 3 Sess. 2. c. 48 Pr.	8 August 1807
An Act for vesting certain Estates, in the Parish of Chaldon Herring, in the County of Dorset, entailed by the Settlement made on the Marriage of the Honourable Lionel Damer deceased, with Williamza his Wife, and the Will of John Damer Esquire, deceased, in Trustees to be sold, and for investing the Monies arising therefrom in the Purchase of other Estates to be settled to the same Uses.
Strode's Estate Act 1807	47 Geo. 3 Sess. 2. c. 49 Pr.	8 August 1807
An Act for vesting in an additional Trustee certain Trust Estates comprised in, and settled by an Act made in the Thirty-third Year of the Reign of His late Majesty King George the Second, intituled, "An Act for settling certain Manors, Capital Messuages, Lands, and Hereditaments, in the County of Hertford, comprized in a Settlement made by William Strode Esquire, deceased, and for purchasing with the Money arising by such Sale other Lands and Hereditaments, to be settled to the like Uses," (Note: Strode's Estate Act 1759 (33 Geo. 2 c. 64 Pr.)) upon the subsisting Trusts of the said Act.
Meyrick's Estate Act 1807	47 Geo. 3 Sess. 2. c. 50 Pr.	8 August 1807
An Act for enabling the Trustees, under the Will of John Meyrick Esquire, deceased, to sell a capital Messuage and Lands at Fulham, in the County of Middlesex, and for other Purposes therein mentioned.
Yarburgh Inclosure Act 1807	47 Geo. 3 Sess. 2. c. 51 Pr.	8 August 1807
An Act for inclosing Lands in the Parish of Yarburgh, in the County of Lincoln.
Westerfield Green Inclosure Act 1807	47 Geo. 3 Sess. 2. c. 52 Pr.	8 August 1807
An Act for inclosing Westerfield Green, in the Parish of Westerfield, in the County of Suffolk.
Cold Green Inclosure Act 1807	47 Geo. 3 Sess. 2. c. 53 Pr.	8 August 1807
An Act for inclosing Cold Green, in the Parish of Wheathill, in the County of Salop.
Exning Inclosure Act 1807	47 Geo. 3 Sess. 2. c. 54 Pr.	8 August 1807
An Act for inclosing Lands in the Parish of Exning, in the County of Suffolk.
Landbeach Inclosure Act 1807	47 Geo. 3 Sess. 2. c. 55 Pr.	8 August 1807
An Act for inclosing Lands in the Parish of Landbeach, in the County of Cambridge.
Steeple Morden Inclosure Act 1807	47 Geo. 3 Sess. 2. c. 56 Pr.	8 August 1807
An Act for allotting and dividing Lands in the Parish of Steeple Morden, in the County of Cambridge.
Barnby Inclosure Act 1807	47 Geo. 3 Sess. 2. c. 57 Pr.	8 August 1807
An Act for inclosing the Lands in the Township or Liberty of Barnby, in the Parishes of Blyth and Sutton cum Lound, or in one or either of them, in the County of Nottingham.
Werminck's Naturalization Act 1807	47 Geo. 3 Sess. 2. c. 58 Pr.	8 August 1807
An Act for naturalizing Johan Gottlob Werninck.
Mosley's Estate Act 1807	47 Geo. 3 Sess. 2. c. 59 Pr.	13 August 1807
An Act for vesting Part of the Real Estates of the late Oswald Mosley Esquire, deceased, devised by his Will, in Trustees and their Heirs, upon Trust to convey the same in the Manner therein mentioned.
Cambridge Inclosure Act 1807	47 Geo. 3 Sess. 2. c. 60 Pr.	13 August 1807
An Act for inclosing Lands in the Parish of Saint Andrew the Less, otherwise called Barnwell, in the Town of Cambridge, in the County of Cambridge, and certain Lands in the Parishes of Saint Andrew the Great, Saint Mary the Great, and Saint Mary the Less, or some or one of them, in the said Town of Cambridge, lying intermixed with the Lands in the said Parish of Saint Andrew the Less, otherwise called Barnwell.
Ellis's Divorce Act 1807	47 Geo. 3 Sess. 2. c. 61 Pr.	13 August 1807
An Act to dissolve the Marriage of John Ellis with Maria Palmer, his now Wife, and to enable him to marry again; and for other Purposes therein mentioned.

=== Sources ===
- "47° Geo. III Sess. 2". The Statutes at Large. Vol. 47 George III. 1807. Sess. 1 & 2. London. 1807. pp. 245–600 – via Google Books.
- "Sess. 1807". Journal of the House of Commons. Vol. 62. London: His Majesty's Stationery Office. pp. 559–848 – via Google Books.
- Chronological Table of and Index to the Statutes. Vol. 1: To the End of the Session 59 Vict. Sess. 2 (1895) (13th ed.). London: Her Majesty's Stationery Office. 1896. pp. 186–188 – via Google Books.
- "Statutes of the United Kingdom of Great Britain and Ireland, 1807". Irish Statute Book. Office of the Attorney General, Government of Ireland.

== See also ==
- List of acts of the Parliament of the United Kingdom
