= Continuance of Laws Act 1778 =

Act of the Parliament of Great Britain

- Act of Parliament
- Parliament of Great Britain
- Long title: An Act to continue the several Laws therein mentioned, relating to the Allowance upon the Exportation of British made Gunpowder; to the further encouraging the Manufacture of British Sail Cloth, and to the Duties payable on Foreign Sail Cloth; to the granting a Liberty to carry Sugars, of the Growth, Produce or Manufacture of any of His Majesty's Sugar Colonies, directly to Foreign Parts, in Ships built in Great Britain, and navigated according to Law; to the further Punishment of Persons going armed or disguised in Defiance of the Laws of Customs or Excise; to the prohibiting the Importation of light Silver Coin of this Realm from Foreign Countries into Great Britain or Ireland, and to restrain the Tender thereof beyond a certain Sum; to the granting a Bounty upon Flax Seed imported into Ireland; to the better regulating of Pilots for the conducting of Ships and Vessels from Dover, Deal and Isle of Thanet; and to revive and continue so much of an Act, made in the Sixteenth Year of His present Majesty's Reign, as relates to allowing the Exportation of certain Quantities of Wheat and other Articles, to His Majesty's Sugar Colonies in America.
- Citation: 18 Geo. 3. c. 45
- Territorial extent: Great Britain

Dates
- Royal assent: 15 May 1778
- Commencement: 20 November 1777 (Note: Start of session.)
- Repealed: 21 August 1871

Other legislation
- Amends: See § Continued enactments
- Repealed by: Statute Law Revision Act 1871
- Relates to: See Expiring laws continuance acts

Status: Repealed

Text of statute as originally enacted

The Continuance of Laws Act 1778 (18 Geo. 3. c. 45) was an act of the Parliament of Great Britain that continued various older acts.

== Background ==
In the United Kingdom, acts of Parliament remain in force until expressly repealed. Many acts of parliament, however, contained time-limited sunset clauses, requiring legislation to revive enactments that had expired or to continue enactments that would otherwise expire.

== Provisions ==
=== Continued enactments ===
Section 1 of the act continued the Exportation Act 1730 (4 Geo. 2. c. 29), as continued by the Customs, etc. Act 1736 (10 Geo. 2. c. 27), the Continuance of Laws, etc. Act 1742 (16 Geo. 2. c. 26), the Continuance of Laws Act 1750 (24 Geo. 2. c. 52), the Passage from Charing Cross Act 1757 (31 Geo. 2. c. 36) , the Continuance of Laws Act 1763 (4 Geo. 3. c. 11) and the Continuance of Certain Laws Act 1772 (12 Geo. 3. c. 56), from the expiration of the act until the end of the next session of parliament after 29 September 1785.

Section 2 of the act continued the Manufacture of Sail Cloth Act 1735 (9 Geo. 2. c. 37), as continued by the Continuance of Laws, etc. Act 1739 (13 Geo. 2. c. 28), the Continuance of Laws Act 1750 (24 Geo. 2. c. 52), the Passage from Charing Cross Act 1757 (31 Geo. 2. c. 36), the Continuance of Laws Act 1763 (4 Geo. 3. c. 11) and the Continuance of Certain Laws Act 1772 (12 Geo. 3. c. 56), from the expiration of the act until the end of the next session of parliament after 29 September 1785.

Section 3 of the act continued the Colonial Trade Act 1738 (12 Geo. 2. c. 30), as continued by the Universities (Wine Licences) Act 1743 (17 Geo. 2. c. 40), the Continuance of Laws (No. 2) Act 1750 (24 Geo. 2. c. 57), the Continuance of Laws, etc., (No. 2) Act 1757 (31 Geo. 2. c. 35), the Continuance of Laws Act 1763 (4 Geo. 3. c. 11) and the Continuance of Certain Laws Act 1772 (12 Geo. 3. c. 56), from the expiration of the act until the end of the next session of parliament after 29 September 1785.

Section 4 of the act continued the Offences against Customs or Excise Act 1745 (19 Geo. 2. c. 34) "as relates to the further punishment of persons going armed or disguised in defiance of the laws of customs or excise, and to the relief of officers of the customs in informations upon seizure", as continued by the Continuance of Laws, etc. Act 1753 (26 Geo. 2. c. 32), the Persons Going Armed or Disguised Act 1758 (32 Geo. 2. c. 23), the Continuance of Laws (No. 2) Act 1763 (4 Geo. 3. c. 12) and the Continuance of Certain Laws, etc. Act 1771 (11 Geo. 3. c. 51), from the expiration of those enactments until the end of the next session of parliament after 29 September 1785.

Section 5 of the act continued the from the expiration of the act until the Light Silver Coin Act 1774 (14 Geo. 3. c. 42), as continued by the Continuance of Laws Act 1776 (16 Geo. 3. c. 54), from the expiration of the act until the end of the next session of parliament after 1 May 1783.

Section 6 of the act continued the Exportation of Army Clothing Act 1775 (15 Geo. 3. c. 45) "as relates to the granting of a bounty upon flax-seed imported into Ireland for a limited time" and the Importation (No. 2) Act 1776 (16 Geo. 3. c. 41) until the end of the next session of parliament after 2 years from the expiration of those enactments.

Section 7 of the act continued the Pilotage Act 1716 (3 Geo. 1. c. 13) and section 14 of the Trade to East Indies, etc. Act 1720 (7 Geo. 1. St. 1. c. 21), as continued by the Continuance of Laws, etc. Act 1723 (10 Geo. 1. c. 17) and the Continuance of Laws (No. 2) Act 1734 (8 Geo. 2. c. 21), the Continuance of Laws, etc. Act 1749 (23 Geo. 2. c. 26) and the Continuance of Laws (No. 2) Act 1763 (4 Geo. 3. c. 12), from the expiration of those enactments until the end of the next session of parliament after 25 March 1792.

Section 8 of the act continued the Exportation Act 1776 (16 Geo. 3. c. 37) "as relates to allowing the exportation of certain quantities of wheat and other articles to his Majesty's sugar colonies in America", as revived and continued by the Exportation (No. 2) Act 1776 (17 Geo. 3. c. 28) from the expiration of those enactments until the end of the next session of parliament after 1 May 1779.

== Subsequent developments ==
The Select Committee on Temporary Laws, Expired or Expiring, appointed in 1796, inspected and considered all temporary laws, observing irregularities in the construction of expiring laws continuance acts, making recommendations and emphasising the importance of the Committee for Expired and Expiring Laws.

The whole act was repealed by section 1 of, and the schedule to, the Statute Law Revision Act 1871 (34 & 35 Vict. c. 116), which came into force on 21 August 1871.
