= Persons Going Armed or Disguised Act 1758 =

Act of the Parliament of Great Britain

- Act of Parliament
- Parliament of Great Britain
- Long title: An Act to continue so much of an Act, made in the Nineteenth Year of the Reign of His present Majesty, as relates to the further Punishment of Persons going armed or disguised, in Defiance of the Laws of Customs or Excise; and to the Relief of the Officers of the Customs, in Informations upon Seizures; and to appropriate certain Penalties mentioned in an Act made in the last Session of Parliament, for the due making of Bread, and to regulate the Price and Assize thereof; and to punish Persons who shall adulterate Meal, Flour, or Bread.
- Citation: 32 Geo. 2. c. 18
- Territorial extent: Great Britain

Dates
- Royal assent: 2 June 1759
- Commencement: 23 November 1758 (Note: Start of session.)
- Repealed: 15 July 1867
Other legislation
Amends	Offences against Customs or Excise Act 1745; Making of Bread Act 1757
Repealed by	Statute Law Revision Act 1867
Relates to	Continuance of Laws, etc. Act 1753; Continuance of Laws (No. 2) Act 1763; Continuance of Certain Laws, etc. Act 1771; Continuance of Laws Act 1778; Continuance of Laws (No. 2) Act 1786; Continuance of Laws Act 1788

Status: Repealed

Text of statute as originally enacted

The Persons Going Armed or Disguised Act 1758 (32 Geo. 2. c. 18) was an act of the Parliament of Great Britain that continued various older acts.

== Background ==
In the United Kingdom, acts of Parliament remain in force until expressly repealed. Many acts of parliament, however, contained time-limited sunset clauses, requiring legislation to revive enactments that had expired or to continue enactments that would otherwise expire.

== Provisions ==
=== Continued enactments ===
Section 1 of the act continued the Offences against Customs or Excise Act 1745 (19 Geo. 2. c. 34) "as relates to the further punishment of persons going armed or disguised in defiance of the laws of customs or excise, and to the relief of officers of the customs in informations upon seizure" from the expiration of those enactments until the end of the next session of parliament after 29 September 1764.

Section 2 of the act provided that penalties or forfeitures made payable by the Making of Bread Act 1757 (31 Geo. 2. c. 29) which were not yet paid or recovered as of 24 June 1759, should be distributed so that one moiety would go to the prosecutor where offenders were convicted by confession or credible witnesses, while the other moiety and all other penalties and forfeitures from the said act should be applied by magistrates within their respective jurisdictions as they thought fit.

== Subsequent developments ==
So much of the Offences against Customs or Excise Act 1745 (19 Geo. 2. c. 34) "as relates to the further punishment of persons going armed or disguised in defiance of the laws of customs or excise, and to the relief of officers of the customs in informations upon seizure" was further continued until the end of the next session of parliament after 29 September 1771 by section 3 of the Continuance of Laws (No. 2) Act 1763 (4 Geo. 3. c. 12).

So much of the Offences against Customs or Excise Act 1745 (19 Geo. 2. c. 34) "as relates to the further punishment of persons going armed or disguised in defiance of the laws of customs or excise, and to the relief of officers of the customs in informations upon seizure" was further continued until the end of the next session of parliament after 29 September 1778 by section 3 of the Continuance of Certain Laws, etc. Act 1771 (11 Geo. 3. c. 51).

So much of the Offences against Customs or Excise Act 1745 (19 Geo. 2. c. 34) "as relates to the further punishment of persons going armed or disguised in defiance of the laws of customs or excise, and to the relief of officers of the customs in informations upon seizure" was further continued until the end of the next session of parliament after 29 September 1785 by section 4 of the Continuance of Laws Act 1778 (18 Geo. 3. c. 45).

So much of the Offences against Customs or Excise Act 1745 (19 Geo. 2. c. 34) "as relates to persons going armed or disguised, in Defiance of the Laws of Customs and Excise; and to the Relief of Officers of the Customs in Informacions upon Seizures, and all the Methods, Orders, Directions, Rules, Proclamations, Penalties, Punishments, Rewards, Matters, and Things provided, settled, ordered directed, imposed, given, and required... relative to the Surrender, proclaiming, apprehending, harbouring, and punishing of such Offenders" was further continued until the end of the next session of parliament after 29 September 1788 by section 1 of the Continuance of Laws (No. 2) Act 1786 (26 Geo. 3. c. 80).

So much of the Offences against Customs or Excise Act 1745 (19 Geo. 2. c. 34) "as relates to the further punishment of persons going armed or disguised in defiance of the laws of customs or excise, and to the relief of officers of the customs in informations upon seizures" was further continued until the end of the next session of parliament after 29 September 1795 by section 3 of the Continuance of Laws Act 1788 (28 Geo. 3. c. 23).

The Select Committee on Temporary Laws, Expired or Expiring, appointed in 1796, inspected and considered all the temporary laws, observed irregularities in the construction of expiring laws continuance acts, making recommendations and emphasising the importance of the Committee for Expired and Expiring Laws.

The whole act was repealed by section 1 of, and the schedule to, the Statute Law Revision Act 1867 (30 & 31 Vict. c. 59), which came into force on 15 July 1867.
