= Offences against Customs or Excise Act 1745 =

Act of the Parliament of Great Britain

- Act of Parliament
- Parliament of Great Britain
- Long title: An Act for the further Punishment of Persons going armed or disguised, in Defiance of the Law of Customs or Excise; and for indemnifying Offenders against those Laws, upon the Terms in this Act mentioned; and for Relief of Officers of the Customs in Informations upon Seizures.
- Citation: 19 Geo. 2. c. 34
- Territorial extent: Great Britain

Dates
- Royal assent: 12 August 1746
- Commencement: 24 July 1746 (Note: Section 1.)
- Repealed: 15 July 1867
Other legislation
| Amended by | Continuance of Laws, etc. Act 1753; Persons Going Armed or Disguised Act 1758; Continuance of Laws (No. 2) Act 1763; Continuance of Certain Laws, etc. Act 1771; Continuance of Laws Act 1778; Continuance of Laws (No. 2) Act 1786; Continuance of Laws Act 1788; Customs Law Repeal Act 1825 |
| Repealed by | Statute Law Revision Act 1867 |

Status: Repealed

Text of statute as originally enacted

The Offences against Customs or Excise Act 1745 (19 Geo. 2. c. 34) was an act of the Parliament of Great Britain, specifying severe punishment for smugglers and their helpers under certain conditions, with financial inducements to bring them to justice.

== Description ==
The long title of the act was:

An Act for the further Punishment of Persons going armed or disguised, in Defiance of the Law of Customs or Excise; and for indemnifying Offenders against those Laws, upon the Terms in this Act mentioned; and for Relief of Officers of the Customs in Informations upon Seizures.

The act is considered the leading statute for smuggling law in 18th-century England as it makes the greatest effort to convict offenders and to sentence those convicted to death. This statute, part of the Bloody Code, further extended the means by which a person could be convicted for smuggling and put to death without benefit of clergy. As the smuggling war continued to burden Parliament in 18th-century England, it became even more crucial to find ways to convict criminals. There were other measures outside death such as the lesser penalty of transportation. This option was available for the lesser crimes, and comparatively few smugglers were actually convicted and even fewer sentenced to death.

The act aimed to put more pressure on those who would defy the law and bring unlawful goods, weapons, etc. into the country. The act mentions so called confederacies of persons with firearms that guarded, aided, and assisted in smuggling illegal or unregulated goods into or out of the country. Persons could be charged under the act by merely being assembled in a group of three or more persons with firearms gathered with the intent of smuggling. Other items in the act would also state that any person caught smuggling who wore a mask, blackened their face, or even went in disguise could be tried and hanged. The statute could also be used against illegal exportation, mainly of wool, which was considered highly valuable to the economy at that time.

The killing of an excise official was considered especially serious under the act. After a conviction was made, assuming the criminal was still at large, a notice would be published in the London Gazette and proclaimed in the closest marketplace to the scene of the crime, and the convict would then have up to forty days to report to the county gaol or prison. If the accused attempted to escape or flee, they would be put to death without the benefit of the clergy.

In England, conviction under the act led to the confiscation of the convict's movable possessions. For those convicted of attempting to hide or aid convicted smugglers, the act called for them to be tried as a felon within one year and for a minimum sentence of seven years, which was customary for most transportation sentences. Should that person attempt to return they would be subject to the death penalty without the benefit of clergy. Also stated in the act was that one hundred pounds would be awarded for every person killed in the course of seizure of illegal goods, wool, etc. If the felon did not report within the forty days, those who apprehended the felon were to be paid a sum of five hundred pounds within a month after the execution.

== Subsequent developments ==
The act "as relates to the further punishment of persons going armed or disguised in defiance of the laws of customs or excise, and to the relief of officers of the customs in informations upon seizure" was continued from the expiration of those enactments until the end of the next session of parliament after 24 June 1758 by section 1 of the Continuance of Laws, etc. Act 1753 (26 Geo. 2. c. 32).

The act "as relates to the further punishment of persons going armed or disguised in defiance of the laws of customs or excise, and to the relief of officers of the customs in informations upon seizure" was continued from the expiration of those enactments until the end of the next session of parliament after 29 September 1764 by section 6 of the Persons Going Armed or Disguised Act 1758 (32 Geo. 2. c. 18).

The act "as relates to the further punishment of persons going armed or disguised in defiance of the laws of customs or excise, and to the relief of officers of the customs in informations upon seizure" was continued from the expiration of those enactments until the end of the next session of parliament after 29 September 1771 by section 3 of the Continuance of Laws (No. 2) Act 1763 (4 Geo. 3. c. 12).

The act "as relates to the further punishment of persons going armed or disguised in defiance of the laws of customs or excise, and to the relief of officers of the customs in informations upon seizure" was continued from the expiration of those enactments until the end of the next session of parliament after 29 September 1778 by section 3 of the Continuance of Certain Laws, etc. Act 1771 (11 Geo. 3. c. 51).

The act "as relates to the further punishment of persons going armed or disguised in defiance of the laws of customs or excise, and to the relief of officers of the customs in informations upon seizure" was continued from the expiration of those enactments until the end of the next session of parliament after 29 September 1785 by section 4 of the Continuance of Laws Act 1778 (18 Geo. 3. c. 45).

The act "as relates to persons going armed or disguised, in Defiance of the Laws of Customs and Excise; and to the Relief of Officers of the Customs in Informacions upon Seizures, and all the Methods, Orders, Directions, Rules, Proclamations, Penalties, Punishments, Rewards, Matters, and Things provided, settled, ordered directed, imposed, given, and required... relative to the Surrender, proclaiming, apprehending, harbouring, and punishing of such Offenders" was continued from the expiration of those enactments until the end of the next session of parliament after 29 September 1788 by section 1 of the Continuance of Laws (No. 2) Act 1786 (26 Geo. 3. c. 80).

The act "as relates to the further punishment of persons going armed or disguised in defiance of the laws of customs or excise, and to the relief of officers of the customs in informations upon seizures" was continued from the expiration of those enactments until the end of the next session of parliament after 29 September 1795 by section 3 of the Continuance of Laws Act 1788 (28 Geo. 3. c. 23).

The act "as relates to the further punishment of persons going armed or disguised in defiance of the laws of customs or excise, and to the relief of officers of the customs in informations upon seizures" was continued from the expiration of those enactments until the end of the next session of parliament after 29 September 1802 by section 13 of the Continuance of Laws Act 1796 (36 Geo. 3. c. 40).

The whole act was repealed by section 1 of, and the schedule to, the Statute Law Revision Act 1867 (30 & 31 Vict. c. 59), which came into force on 15 July 1867.
