= Continuance of Certain Laws, etc. Act 1771 =

Act of the Parliament of Great Britain

- Act of Parliament
- Parliament of Great Britain
- Long title: An Act for continuing several Laws for the better Regulation of Lastage and Balastage in the River Thames; for the further Punishment of Persons going armed or disguised, in Desiance of the Laws of Customs or Excise; and for the landing of Rum or Spirits of the British Sugar Plantations before Payment of the Duties of Excise; for repealing so much of an Act, passed in the Sixth Year of the Reign of King George the First, intituled, "An Act for preventing the Carriage of excessive Loads of Meal, Malt, Bricks, and Coals, within Ten Miles of the Cities of London and Westminster," as relates to the Carriage of Meal, Malt, and Coals; and for authorizing the Exportation of a limited Quantity of an inferior Sort of Barley, called Bigg, from the Port of Kirkwall, in the Islands of Orkney.
- Citation: 11 Geo. 3. c. 51
- Territorial extent: Great Britain

Dates
- Royal assent: 8 May 1771
- Commencement: 13 November 1770 (Note: Start of session.)
- Repealed: 21 August 1871
Other legislation
Amends	See § Continued enactments
Repealed by	Statute Law Revision Act 1871
Relates to	See Expiring laws continuance acts

Status: Repealed

Text of statute as originally enacted

The Continuance of Certain Laws, etc. Act 1771 (11 Geo. 3. c. 51) was an act of the Parliament of Great Britain that continued various older acts.

== Background ==
In the United Kingdom, acts of Parliament remain in force until expressly repealed. Many acts of parliament, however, contained time-limited sunset clauses, requiring legislation to revive enactments that had expired or to continue enactments that would otherwise expire.

== Provisions ==
=== Continued enactments ===
Section 1 of the act continued the River Thames (Lastage and Ballastage) Act 1732 (6 Geo. 2. c. 29), as continued by the River Thames (Lastage and Ballastage) Act 1737 (11 Geo. 2. c. 12), the Lastage and Ballastage, Thames Act 1744 (18 Geo. 2. c. 21), from the expiration of the act until the end of the next session of parliament after 24 June 1782.

Section 2 of the act continued the Spirit Duties, etc. Act 1741 (15 Geo. 2. c. 25) "as relates to the landing of rum or spirits of the British sugar plantations, before payment of the duties of excise, and to the lodging of the same in warehouses at the expence of the importers or proprietors thereof", as continued by the Continuance of Laws, etc. Act 1749 (23 Geo. 2. c. 26), the Passage from Charing Cross Act 1757 (31 Geo. 2. c. 36) and Continuance of Laws (No. 2) Act 1763 (4 Geo. 3. c. 12), from the expiration of those enactments until the end of the next session of parliament after 29 September 1778.

Section 3 of the act continued the Offences against Customs or Excise Act 1745 (19 Geo. 2. c. 34) "as relates to the further punishment of persons going armed or disguised in defiance of the laws of customs or excise, and to the relief of officers of the customs in informations upon seizure", as continued by the Continuance of Laws, etc. Act 1753 (26 Geo. 2. c. 32), the Continuance of Laws Act 1758 (32 Geo. 2. c. 23) and the Continuance of Laws (No. 2) Act 1763 (4 Geo. 3. c. 12), until the end of the next session of parliament after 29 September 1778.

Section 4 and 5 of the act repealed so much of the Excessive Loading of Vehicles, London and Westminster Act 1719 (6 Geo. 1. c. 6) "as relates to the carriage of meal, malt, and coals" and the clause in the Westminster Streets Act 1763 (4 Geo. 3. c. 39) that "no person shall carry at any one load within the limits mentioned in the above-recited act of the sixth of King George the First, in any waggon, or cart, having the wheels thereof shod or bound with tire or streaks of iron, more than one chaldron of coals with the ingrain thereto belonging, after the rate of one chaldron for every twenty chaldrons".

Section 6 of the act provided that it shall be lawful for his Majesty, his heirs and successors, by order or orders to be made in council for that purpose, under such limitations and restrictions as shall be expressed in such order or orders, to permit and authorise the exportation of any quantity or quantities of such barley or bigg, not exceeding five thousand quarters, of the growth of the islands of Orkney, from the port of Kirkwall to the kingdom of Portugal, or elsewhere, any law or statute to the contrary notwithstanding.

Section 7 of the act provided that no bounty or allowance whatsoever shall be granted or paid in respect of such barley or bigg to be exported as aforesaid.

== Subsequent developments ==
The Select Committee on Temporary Laws, Expired or Expiring, appointed in 1796, inspected and considered all temporary laws, observing irregularities in the construction of expiring laws continuance acts, making recommendations and emphasising the importance of the Committee for Expired and Expiring Laws.

The whole act was repealed by section 1 of, and the schedule to, the Statute Law Revision Act 1871 (34 & 35 Vict. c. 116), which came into force on 21 August 1871.
