= Continuance of Laws (No. 2) Act 1763 =

Act of the Parliament of Great Britain

- Act of Parliament
- Parliament of Great Britain
- Long title: An Act to continue several Laws, for the better regulating of Pilots for the conducting of Ships and Vessels from Dover, Deal, and Isle of Thanet, up the Rivers of Thames and Medway; relating to the landing of Rum or Spirits of the British Sugar Plantations before the Duties of Excise are paid thereon; and to the further Punishment of Persons going armed or disguised, in Defiance of the Laws of Customs or Excise; and to the Relief of the Officers of the Customs in Informations upon Seizures; and for granting a Liberty to carry Sugars, of the Growth, Produce, or Manufacture, of any of His Majesty's Sugar Colonies, directly into Foreign Parts, in Ships built in Great Britain, and navigated according to Law; and for punishing Persons who shall damage or destroy any Banks, Flood-gates, Sluices, or other Works, belonging to Rivers and Streams made navigable by Act of Parliament.
- Citation: 4 Geo. 3. c. 12
- Territorial extent: Great Britain

Dates
- Royal assent: 5 April 1764
- Commencement: 15 November 1763 (Note: Start of session.)
- Repealed: 15 July 1867
Other legislation
Amends	See § Continued enactments
Repealed by	Statute Law Revision Act 1867
Relates to	See Expiring laws continuance acts

Status: Repealed

Text of statute as originally enacted

The Continuance of Laws (No. 2) Act 1763 (4 Geo. 3. c. 12) was an act of the Parliament of Great Britain that continued various older enactments.

== Background ==
In the United Kingdom, acts of Parliament remain in force until expressly repealed. Many acts of parliament, however, contained time-limited sunset clauses, requiring legislation to revive enactments that had expired or to continue enactments that would otherwise expire.

== Provisions ==
=== Continued enactments ===
Section 1 of the act continued the Pilotage Act 1716 (3 Geo. 1. c. 13) and section 14 of the Trade to East Indies, etc. Act 1720 (7 Geo. 1. St. 1. c. 21), as continued by the Continuance of Laws, etc. Act 1723 (10 Geo. 1. c. 17) and the Continuance of Laws (No. 2) Act 1734 (8 Geo. 2. c. 21) and the Continuance of Laws, etc. Act 1749 (23 Geo. 2. c. 26), from the expiration of those enactments until the end of the next session of parliament after 25 March 1778.

Section 2 of the act continued the Spirit Duties, etc. Act 1741 (15 Geo. 2. c. 25) "as relates to the landing of rum or spirits of the British sugar plantations, before payment of the duties of excise, and to the lodging of the same in warehouses at the expence of the importers or proprietors thereof", as continued by the Continuance of Laws, etc. Act 1749 (23 Geo. 2. c. 26) and the Passage from Charing Cross Act 1757 (31 Geo. 2. c. 36), from the expiration of those enactments until the end of the next session of parliament after 29 September 1771.

Section 3 of the act continued the Offences against Customs or Excise Act 1745 (19 Geo. 2. c. 34) "as relates to the further punishment of persons going armed or disguised in defiance of the laws of customs or excise, and to the relief of officers of the customs in informations upon seizure", as continued by the Continuance of Laws, etc. Act 1753 (26 Geo. 2. c. 32) and the Persons Going Armed or Disguised Act 1758 (32 Geo. 2. c. 23), from the expiration of those enactments until the end of the next session of parliament after 29 September 1771.

Section 4 of the act continued the Colonial Trade Act 1738 (12 Geo. 2. c. 30), as continued by the Universities (Wine Licences) Act 1743 (17 Geo. 2. c. 40), the Continuance of Laws (No. 2) Act 1750 (24 Geo. 2. c. 57) and the Continuance of Laws, etc., (No. 2) Act 1757 (31 Geo. 2. c. 35), from the expiration of the act until the end of the next session of parliament after 29 September 1771.

Section 5 of the act continued the provided that persons who wilfully or maliciously break, throw down, damage, or destroy any banks, flood-gates, sluices, or other works belonging to rivers and streams made navigable by act of parliament, or do any other wilful hurt or mischief to obstruct such navigation, would be adjudged guilty of felony and may be transported for 7 years.

== Subsequent developments ==
The Select Committee on Temporary Laws, Expired or Expiring, appointed in 1796, inspected and considered all temporary laws, observing irregularities in the construction of expiring laws continuance acts, making recommendations and emphasising the importance of the Committee for Expired and Expiring Laws.

The whole act was repealed by section 1 of, and the schedule to, the Statute Law Revision Act 1867 (30 & 31 Vict. c. 59), which came into force on 15 July 1867.
