= List of acts of the Parliament of Great Britain from 1781 =

This is a complete list of acts of the Parliament of Great Britain for the year 1781.

For acts passed until 1707, see the list of acts of the Parliament of England and the list of acts of the Parliament of Scotland. See also the list of acts of the Parliament of Ireland.

For acts passed from 1801 onwards, see the list of acts of the Parliament of the United Kingdom. For acts of the devolved parliaments and assemblies in the United Kingdom, see the list of acts of the Scottish Parliament, the list of acts of the Northern Ireland Assembly, and the list of acts and measures of Senedd Cymru; see also the list of acts of the Parliament of Northern Ireland.

The number shown after each act's title is its chapter number. Acts are cited using this number, preceded by the year(s) of the reign during which the relevant parliamentary session was held; thus the Union with Ireland Act 1800 is cited as "39 & 40 Geo. 3. c. 67", meaning the 67th act passed during the session that started in the 39th year of the reign of George III and which finished in the 40th year of that reign. Note that the modern convention is to use Arabic numerals in citations (thus "41 Geo. 3" rather than "41 Geo. III"). Acts of the last session of the Parliament of Great Britain and the first session of the Parliament of the United Kingdom are both cited as "41 Geo. 3".

Acts passed by the Parliament of Great Britain did not have a short title; however, some of these acts have subsequently been given a short title by acts of the Parliament of the United Kingdom (such as the Short Titles Act 1896).

Before the Acts of Parliament (Commencement) Act 1793 came into force on 8 April 1793, acts passed by the Parliament of Great Britain were deemed to have come into effect on the first day of the session in which they were passed. Because of this, the years given in the list below may in fact be the year before a particular act was passed.

== 21 Geo. 3 ==
The first session of the 15th Parliament of Great Britain, which met from 31 October 1780 until 18 July 1781.

This session was also traditionally cited as 21 G. 3.

=== Public acts ===
Short title	Citation	Royal assent
Long title
Destruction of Prisons by Rioters Act 1781 (repealed)	21 Geo. 3. c. 1	27 November 1780
An Act to extend the Provisions contained in an Act passed in the last Session of Parliament, intituled, "An Act to prevent any Mischief or Inconvenience which may arise to Sheriffs, Gaolers, Suitors, Prisoners, or others, by the Prisoners in several Gaols in the Counties of Middlesex and Surrey, and the City of London, having been set at Liberty during the late Tumults and Insurrections;" (Note: Release of Prisoners by Rioters Act 1780 (20 Geo. 3. c. 64)) to Persons arrested and bailed since the Destruction of the said Gaols, and before the same shall be repaired, or other Prisons substituted in lieu thereof. (Repealed by Statute Law Revision Act 1871 (34 & 35 Vict. c. 116))
Habeas Corpus Suspension Act 1781 (repealed)	21 Geo. 3. c. 2	27 November 1780
An Act for further continuing an Act made in the Seventeenth Year of the Reign of His present Majesty, intituled, "An Act to empower His Majesty to secure and detain Persons charged with, or suspected of, the Crime of High Treason, committed in any of His Majesty's Colonies or Plantations in America, or on the High Seas, or the Crime of Piracy." (Note: Habeas Corpus Suspension Act 1776 (17 Geo. 3. c. 9)) (Repealed by Statute Law Revision Act 1871 (34 & 35 Vict. c. 116))
Land Tax Act 1781 (repealed)	21 Geo. 3. c. 3	27 November 1780
An Act for granting an Aid to His Majesty by a Land Tax, to be raised in Great Britain, for the Service of the Year One thousand seven hundred and eighty-one. (Repealed by Statute Law Revision Act 1871 (34 & 35 Vict. c. 116))
Malt Duties Act 1781 (repealed)	21 Geo. 3. c. 4	27 November 1780
An Act for continuing and granting to His Majesty certain Duties upon Malt, Mum, Cyder, and Perry, for the Service of the Year One thousand seven hundred and eighty-one. (Repealed by Statute Law Revision Act 1871 (34 & 35 Vict. c. 116))
Prize Act 1781 (repealed)	21 Geo. 3. c. 5	12 March 1781
An Act for extending the Provisions of Three Acts made in the Eighteenth, (Note: Prize Act 1778 (18 Geo. 3. c. 15)) Nineteenth (Note: Prize Act 1779 (19 Geo. 3. c. 5)) and Twentieth (Note: Prize Act 1780 (20 Geo. 3. c. 9)) Years of His present Majesty's Reign, with respect to bringing Prize Goods into this Kingdom, to Prizes taken from the States General of the United Provinces; for declaring what Goods shall be deemed Military or Ship Stores; for regulating the Sale of, and ascertaining the Duties upon East India Goods condemned as Prize in the Port of London; for permitting the Purchasers of Prize Goods, condemned abroad to import such Goods into this Kingdom, under the like Regulations and Advantages as are granted by Law to Captors themselves; and for reducing the Duties on Foreign Prize Tobacco. (Repealed by Naval Prize Acts Repeal Act 1864 (27 & 28 Vict. c. 23))
Importation Act 1781 (repealed)	21 Geo. 3. c. 6	12 March 1781
An Act for further continuing an Act, made in the Nineteenth Year of the Reign of His present Majesty, (Note: Importation of Silk Act 1779 (19 Geo. 3. c. 9)) for allowing the Importation of fine organzined Italian Thrown Silk, in any Ships or Vessels, for a limited Time. (Repealed by Statute Law Revision Act 1871 (34 & 35 Vict. c. 116))
Militia Act 1781 (repealed)	21 Geo. 3. c. 7	12 March 1781
An Act to explain and amend an Act, made in the Nineteenth Year of His present Majesty, intituled, "An Act for augmenting the Militia." (Note: Militia Act 1779 (19 Geo. 3. c. 76)) (Repealed by Statute Law Revision Act 1861 (24 & 25 Vict. c. 101))
Mutiny Act 1781 (repealed)	21 Geo. 3. c. 8	12 March 1781
An Act for punishing Mutiny and Desertion, and for the better Payment of the Army and their Quarters. (Repealed by Statute Law Revision Act 1871 (34 & 35 Vict. c. 116))
Marine Mutiny Act 1781 (repealed)	21 Geo. 3. c. 9	12 March 1781
An Act for the Regulation of His Majesty's Marine Forces while on Shore. (Repealed by Statute Law Revision Act 1871 (34 & 35 Vict. c. 116))
Gravesend and Tilbury Fortifications Act 1781	21 Geo. 3. c. 10	12 March 1781
An Act for making Compensation to the Proprietors of certain Messuages, Lands, Tenements and Hereditaments in the Counties of Kent and Essex, purchased in pursuance of Two several Acts of Parliament, passed in the Twentieth Year of the Reign of His present Majesty, (Note: Plymouth, Sheerness, Gravesend, Tilbury (Fortifications) Act 1780 (20 Geo. 3. c. 38)) (Note: Chatham Fortifications Act 1780 (20 Geo. 3. c. 49)) for securing his Majesty's Docks, Ships and Stores, at Sheerness and Chatham; and for better defending the Passage of the River Thames at Gravesend and Tilbury Fort.
Navy, etc. Act 1781 (repealed)	21 Geo. 3. c. 11	12 March 1781
An Act for the better Supply of Mariners and Seamen, to serve in His Majesty's Ships of War; and on board Merchant Ships, and other trading Ships and Vessels. (Repealed by Statute Law Revision Act 1871 (34 & 35 Vict. c. 116))
Whitby Harbour Act 1781 (repealed)	21 Geo. 3. c. 12	12 March 1781
An Act to continue the Duty of One Farthing per Chalder on Coals, granted by an Act of the Twenty-third Year of the Reign of King George the Second, (Note: Whitby Harbour Act 1749 (23 Geo. 2. c. 39)) for the more effectual repairing and maintaining the Piers and Harbour of Whitby in the County of York. (Repealed by Whitby Piers and Harbour Act 1827 (7 & 8 Geo. 4. c. lxxviii))
Stow, Suffolk (Poor Relief) Act 1781 (repealed)	21 Geo. 3. c. 13	22 March 1781
An Act for rendering effectual an Act made in the Eighteenth Year of His present Majesty, (Note: Stow, Suffolk (Poor Relief) Act 1778 (18 Geo. 3. c. 35)) for the better Relief and Employment of the Poor within the Hundred of Stow in the County of Suffolk. (Repealed by Statute Law Revision Act 1948 (11 & 12 Geo. 6. c. 62))
Lotteries (Ireland) Act 1780 or the Lotteries (Ireland) Act 1780	21 Geo. 3. c. 14	22 March 1781
An Act for raising a certain Sum by way of Annuities, and a Lottery, and for consolidating certain Annuities which were made One Joint Stock by an Act made in the Second Year of the Reign of His present Majesty, (Note: National Debt (No. 2) Act 1761 (2 Geo. 3. c. 10)) with certain Annuities consolidated by several Acts made in the Twenty-fifth (Note: National Debt (No. 2) Act 1751 (25 Geo. 2. c. 27)) and Twenty-sixth (Note: National Debt (No. 2) Act 1753 (26 Geo. 2. c. 23)) Years of the Reign of King George the Second, and in the Fifth Year of the Reign of His present Majesty. (Note: National Debt (No. 2) Act 1765 (5 Geo. 3. c. 23))
Navy Act 1781 (repealed)	21 Geo. 3. c. 15	22 March 1781
An Act for the Encouragement of Seamen, and for the more speedy and effectual Manning His Majesty's Navy. (Repealed by Naval Prize Acts Repeal Act 1864 (27 & 28 Vict. c. 23))
Customs Act 1781 (repealed)	21 Geo. 3. c. 16	29 March 1781
An Act for repealing the Discounts and Abatements upon certain Foreign Goods, and for granting additional Duties upon Tobacco and Sugar imported into Great Britain. (Repealed by Customs Law Repeal Act 1825 (6 Geo. 4. c. 105))
Excise Duties Act 1781 (repealed)	21 Geo. 3. c. 17	29 March 1781
An Act for granting to His Majesty an additional Duty upon the Produce of the several Duties under the Management of the respective Commissioners of the Excise in Great Britain. (Repealed by Statute Law Revision Act 1861 (24 & 25 Vict. c. 101))
Militia (No. 2) Act 1781 (repealed)	21 Geo. 3. c. 18	29 March 1781
An Act for keeping the Militia Forces of this Kingdom complete, during the Time therein mentioned. (Repealed by Statute Law Revision Act 1871 (34 & 35 Vict. c. 116))
Navigation Act 1781 (repealed)	21 Geo. 3. c. 19	11 April 1781
An Act to permit the Importation of Flax and Flax Seed into this Kingdom or Ireland, in any Ship or Vessel belonging to any Kingdom or State in Amity with His Majesty, navigated with Foreign Mariners, during the present Hostilities. (Repealed by Statute Law Revision Act 1871 (34 & 35 Vict. c. 116))
Turnpike Roads Act 1781 (repealed)	21 Geo. 3. c. 20	11 April 1781
An Act for declaring certain Provisions of an Act made in the Thirteenth Year of His present Majesty, (Note: Turnpike Roads Act 1773 (13 Geo. 3. c. 84)) relating to the Turnpike Roads in that Part of Great Britain called England, to extend to all Acts made, and to be made, for repairing Roads subsequent to the passing of the said Act. (Repealed by Turnpike Roads Act 1822 (3 Geo. 4. c. 126))
Militia Pay Act 1781 (repealed)	21 Geo. 3. c. 21	22 March 1781
An Act for defraying the Charge of the Pay and Cloathing of the Militia in that Part of Great Britain called England, for one Year, beginning the Twenty-fifth Day of March One thousand seven hundred and eighty-one. (Repealed by Statute Law Revision Act 1871 (34 & 35 Vict. c. 116))
Bourn, Lincolnshire Navigation Act 1781 or the Bourne Eau Act 1781 or the Bourne Navigation Act 1780	21 Geo. 3. c. 22	29 March 1781
An Act for improving the Navigation of the River called Bourn Eau, from the Town of Bourn to its Junction with the River Glen, at a Place called Tongue End, in the County of Lincoln.
Land Tax (Commissioners) Act 1781 (repealed)	21 Geo. 3. c. 23	22 March 1781
An Act for appointing Commissioners for putting in Execution an Act of this Session of Parliament, intituled, "An Act for granting an Aid to His Majesty by a Land Tax to be raised in Great Britain, for the Service of the Year One thousand seven hundred and eighty-one." (Note: Land Tax Act 1781 (21 Geo. 3. c. 3)) (Repealed by Statute Law Revision Act 1871 (34 & 35 Vict. c. 116))
Paper Duties Act 1781 (repealed)	21 Geo. 3. c. 24	18 May 1781
An Act for repealing the present Duties upon Paper, Pasteboards, Millboards, and Scaleboards, made in Great Britain, and for granting other Duties in lieu thereof. (Repealed by Duties on Paper Act 1839 (2 & 3 Vict. c. 23))
Indemnity Act 1781 (repealed)	21 Geo. 3. c. 25	18 May 1781
An Act to indemnify such Persons as have omitted to qualify themselves for Offices and Employments, and to indemnify Justices of the Peace or others, who have omitted to register or deliver in their Qualifications within the Time limited by Law, and for giving further Time for those Purposes; and to indemnify Members and Officers in Cities, Corporations, and Borough Towns, whose Admissions have been omitted to be stamped according to Law, or having been stamped, have been lost or mislaid, and for allowing them Time to provide Admissions duly stamped; and to give further Time to such Persons as have omitted to make and file Affidavits of the Execution of Indentures of Clerks to Attornies and Solicitors. (Repealed by Promissory Oaths Act 1871 (34 & 35 Vict. c. 48))
Importation (No. 2) Act 1781 (repealed)	21 Geo. 3. c. 26	18 May 1781
An Act to permit Goods the Product or Manufacture of certain Places within the Levant or Mediterranean Seas, to be imported into Great Britain or Ireland, in British or Foreign Vessels, from any Place whatsoever; and for laying a Duty on Cotton and Cotton Wool imported into this Kingdom in Foreign Ships or Vessels, during the present Hostilities. (Repealed by Statute Law Revision Act 1871 (34 & 35 Vict. c. 116))
Importation (No. 3) Act 1781 (repealed)	21 Geo. 3. c. 27	18 May 1781
An Act to permit during the present Hostilities the Importation of Goods, the Produce of the Plantations of the Crown of Portugal into Great Britain or Ireland in Portuguese Vessels; and the Importation of certain other Goods therein enumerated in any Neutral Ships and Vessels. (Repealed by Statute Law Revision Act 1871 (34 & 35 Vict. c. 116))
Customs (No. 2) Act 1781 (repealed)	21 Geo. 3. c. 28	18 May 1781
An Act for allowing further Time for the Exportation of, or Payment of the Duties upon Bugles when warehoused upon Importation into this Kingdom, and for obviating a Doubt with respect to charging the Duties on Rum imported, from Scotland into the Isle of Man. (Repealed by Customs Law Repeal Act 1825 (6 Geo. 4. c. 105))
Continuance of Laws Act 1781 (repealed)	21 Geo. 3. c. 29	18 May 1781
An Act to continue several Laws relating to the opening and establishing certain Free Ports in the Island of Jamaica; to the allowing the free Importation of Sago-Powder and Vermicelli from His Majesty's Colonies in North America; to the free Importation of certain Raw Hides and Skins from Ireland and the British Plantations in America; to the allowing the Exportation of Provisions, Goods, Wares, and Merchandize, to certain Places in North America, which are, or may be under the Protection of His Majesty's Arms, and from such Places to Great Britain, and other Parts of His Majesty's Dominions; to the clandestine running of uncustomed Goods, and preventing Frauds relating to the Customs; to the preventing the clandestine running of Goods, and the Danger of Infection thereby; to the encouraging the Growth of Coffee in His Majesty's Plantations in America; to the preventing the committing of Frauds by Bankrupts; and to revive and continue several Laws relating to allowing the Exportation of certain Quantities of Wheat, and other Articles to His Majesty's Sugar Colonies in America; to the impowering His Majesty to prohibit the Exportation, and restrain the carrying Coastwise of Copper in Bars, or Copper in Sheets; to the allowing a Drawback of the Duties on Rum shipped as Stores, to be consumed on board Merchant Ships on their Voyages; and to the allowing a Bounty on the Exportation of British Corn and Grain in Neutral Ships. (Repealed by Statute Law Revision Act 1871 (34 & 35 Vict. c. 116))
River Colne Navigation Act 1781 (repealed)	21 Geo. 3. c. 30	18 May 1781
An Act for continuing and making more effectual several Acts of Parliament passed, for cleansing and making navigable the Channel from the Hythe at Colchester, to Wivenhoe, in the County of Essex; and for repairing and cleansing the Streets of the Town of Colchester, and also for lighting the Streets and Lanes, and for preventing Annoyances in the said Town. (Repealed by Colchester and Wivenhoe Navigation and Colchester Improvement Act 1811 (51 Geo. 3. c. xliii))
Duties on Servants Act 1781 (repealed)	21 Geo. 3. c. 31	18 May 1781
An Act for the better Management and Collection of the Duties upon Male Servants, granted by an Act made in the Seventeenth Year of the Reign of His present Majesty. (Note: Taxation (No. 2) Act 1776 (17 Geo. 3. c. 39)) (Repealed by House Tax Act 1803 (43 Geo. 3. c. 161))
Customs (No. 3) Act 1781 (repealed)	21 Geo. 3. c. 32	18 May 1781
An Act to encourage the Manufactory of Verdigrease in Great Britain, and for laying a Duty on Foreign Verdigrease imported. (Repealed by Statute Law Revision Act 1861 (24 & 25 Vict. c. 101))
Henley Bridge Act 1781	21 Geo. 3. c. 33	18 May 1781
An Act for building a Bridge over the River Thames, at the Town of Henley upon Thames, in the County of Oxford, and making commodious Avenues thereto; for widening some Part of the High Street and the Market Place; for lighting and watching; for regulating the Footways in, and for removing Nuisances, Obstructions, and Annoyances from the said Town.
Admeasurement of Coals Act 1781 (repealed)	21 Geo. 3. c. 34	19 June 1781
An Act for further continuing and amending the several Acts passed for preventing the Frauds and Abuses committed in the Admeasurement of Coals within the City and Liberty of Westminster, and that Part of the Duchy of Lancaster adjoining thereto, and the several Parishes of Saint Giles in the Fields and Saint Mary le Bonne, and such Part of the Parish of Saint Andrew Holborn as lies in the County of Middlesex. (Repealed by Statute Law Revision Act 1861 (24 & 25 Vict. c. 101))
Old Shoreham Bridge Act 1781	21 Geo. 3. c. 35	18 May 1781
An Act for building a Bridge over the River Adur, at or near Old Shoreham, in the County of Sussex.
Devizes (Streets) Act 1781 (repealed)	21 Geo. 3. c. 36	19 June 1781
An Act for amending, regulating, cleansing, lighting, watching and keeping in Repair the Streets, Lanes, and Passages within the Borough of the Devizes, in the County of Wilts; and for preventing Nuisances, Annoyances and Obstructions therein. (Repealed by Devizes Improvement Act 1825 (6 Geo. 4. c. clxii))
Exportation Act 1781 (repealed)	21 Geo. 3. c. 37	19 June 1781
An Act to explain and amend an Act, made in the Fourteenth Year of the Reign of His present Majesty, intituled, "An Act to prevent the Exportation to foreign Parts of Utensils made use of in the Cotton, Linen, Woollen and Silk Manufactures of this Kingdom." (Note: Exportation (No. 5) Act 1774 (14 Geo. 3. c. 71)) (Repealed by Customs Law Repeal Act 1825 (6 Geo. 4. c. 105))
Beverley (Small Debts) Act 1781 (repealed)	21 Geo. 3. c. 38	19 June 1781
An Act for the more easy and speedy Recovery of Small Debts within the Town and Liberties of Beverley, in the County of York, and the several Parishes of the same Town. (Repealed by County Courts Act 1846 (9 & 10 Vict. c. 95))
Smuggling Act 1781 (repealed)	21 Geo. 3. c. 39	19 June 1781
An Act for further securing the Property of the Owners in such Ships or Vessels as are liable to forfeiture, for importing Spirits or other Goods, by the Misconduct of the Masters, Mates and Seamen. (Repealed by Customs Law Repeal Act 1825 (6 Geo. 4. c. 105))
Bounties Act 1781 (repealed)	21 Geo. 3. c. 40	19 June 1781
An Act for extending the Provisions of Three Acts, made in the Twenty-ninth Year of His late Majesty, (Note: Exportation Act 1756 (29 Geo. 2. c. 15)) and in the Tenth (Note: Exportation (No. 4) Act 1770 (10 Geo. 3. c. 38)) and Nineteenth (Note: Bounties Act 1779 (19 Geo. 3. c. 27)) Years of His present Majesty's Reign, for granting a Bounty on certain Species of British and Irish Linens exported, to British and Irish Linens, British Callicoes and Cottons, or Cotton mixed with Linen, printed, painted, or stained in Great Britain, and to Buckrams and Tilletings exported during the Time therein limited; and for taking off the Duties payable upon the Importation of that Species of Blue called Smalts. (Repealed by Statute Law Revision Act 1871 (34 & 35 Vict. c. 116))
Loans or Exchequer Bills Act 1781 (repealed)	21 Geo. 3. c. 41	19 June 1781
An Act for raising a certain Sum of Money by Loans or Exchequer Bills, for the Service of the Year One thousand seven hundred and eighty-one. (Repealed by Statute Law Revision Act 1871 (34 & 35 Vict. c. 116))
Loans or Exchequer Bills (No. 2) Act 1781 (repealed)	21 Geo. 3. c. 42	19 June 1781
An Act for raising a further Sum of Money by Loans or Exchequer Bills, for the Service of the Year One thousand seven hundred and eighty-one. (Repealed by Statute Law Revision Act 1871 (34 & 35 Vict. c. 116))
Parliament Act 1781 (repealed)	21 Geo. 3. c. 43	19 June 1781
An Act for continuing an Act, made in the Twentieth Year of the Reign of His present Majesty, intituled, "An Act for exempting the City of Winchester, the County of Southampton, the Town of Shrewsbury, and the County of Salop, out of the Provisions of an Act made in the Eighth Year of the Reign of His late Majesty King George the Second, intituled, 'An Act for regulating the Quartering of Soldiers during the Time of Elections of Members to serve in Parliament,' (Note: Parliamentary Elections Act 1734 (8 Geo. 2. c. 30)) so far as the same relates to the Removal of Troops during the Elections of Members to serve in Parliament, for a limited Time." (Note: Parliament (No. 2) Act 1780 (20 Geo. 3. c. 50)) (Repealed by Statute Law Revision Act 1871 (34 & 35 Vict. c. 116))
Prize (No. 2) Act 1781 (repealed)	21 Geo. 3. c. 44	19 June 1781
An Act for the more effectually securing to the Royal Hospital for Seamen at Greenwich, all such forfeited and unclaimed Shares of Prize and Bounty Money as shall arise from, or in respect of any Prizes to be condemned and sold in His Majesty's Dominions beyond the Sea, and to compel the more speedy Payment thereof. (Repealed by Naval Prize Acts Repeal Act 1864 (27 & 28 Vict. c. 23))
Audit of Public Accounts Act 1781 (repealed)	21 Geo. 3. c. 45	19 June 1781
An Act for continuing and amending an Act made in the last Session of Parliament, intituled, "An Act for appointing and enabling Commissioners to examine, take, and state the Public Accounts of the Kingdom, and to report what Balances are in the Hands of Accountants, which may be applied to the Public Service; and what Defects there are in the present Mode of receiving, collecting, issuing and accounting for Public Money; and in what more expeditious and effectual and less expensive Manner the said Services can in future be regulated and carried on for the Benefit of the Public." (Note: Audit of Public Accounts Act 1780 (20 Geo. 3. c. 54)) (Repealed by Statute Law Revision Act 1871 (34 & 35 Vict. c. 116))
Woolwich Fortifications Act 1781	21 Geo. 3. c. 46	19 June 1781
An Act to enable John Bowater Esquire, to grant Leases in Possession or Reversion of a Dock Yard and Land at Woolwich, in the County of Kent (being Part of his Settled Estate) to the principal Officers and Commissioners of His Majesty's Navy, on behalf of His Majesty, His Heirs and Successors.
Oxford Improvement Act 1781 (repealed)	21 Geo. 3. c. 47	19 June 1781
An Act to amend and enlarge the Powers of an Act passed in the Eleventh Year of His present Majesty's Reign, (Note: Oxford Improvement Act 1771 (11 Geo. 3. c. 19)) for performing several Works, and making Improvements, within the University and City of Oxford, and the Suburbs thereof, and in the adjoining Parish of Saint Clement. (Repealed by Oxford Improvement Act 1835 (5 & 6 Will. 4. c. lxix), Oxford Improvement Act 1848 (11 & 12 Vict. c. xxxvii), Local Government Supplemental Act 1865 (No. 5) (28 & 29 Vict. c. 108) and Local Government Board's Provisional Orders Confirmation Act 1889 (52 & 53 Vict. c. xv) (Note: Incorrectly cited as "52 & 33 Vict. c. xv" in the Chronological Table of the Statutes.))
Paymaster-general, Balance, etc. Act 1781 (repealed)	21 Geo. 3. c. 48	5 July 1781
An Act to direct the Payment into the Exchequer of the respective Balances remaining in the Hands of the several Persons therein-named, for the Use and Benefit of the Public, and for indemnifying the said respective Persons and their Representatives, in respect of such Payments, and against all future Claims relating thereto; and for other Purposes therein-mentioned. (Repealed by Statute Law Revision Act 1871 (34 & 35 Vict. c. 116))
Sunday Observance Act 1780 or the Sunday Observance Act 1781 (repealed)	21 Geo. 3. c. 49	19 June 1781
An Act for preventing certain Abuses and Profanations on the Lord's Day, called Sunday. (Repealed by Licensing Act 2003 (c. 17))
Corn Act 1781 (repealed)	21 Geo. 3. c. 50	19 June 1781
An Act for further regulating and ascertaining the Importation and Exportation of Corn and Grain within several Ports and Places therein mentioned. (Repealed by Importation and Exportation (No. 2) Act 1791 (31 Geo. 3. c. 30))
Papists Act 1781 (repealed)	21 Geo. 3. c. 51	5 July 1781
An Act to explain an Act passed in the Third Year of George the First, (Note: Papists Act 1716 (3 Geo. 1. c. 18)) intituled, "An Act for explaining an Act passed in the last Session of Parliament, (Note: Papists Act 1715 (1 Geo. 1. St. 2. c. 55)) intituled, 'An Act to oblige Papists to register their Names and Real Estates, and for enlarging the Time of such registering, and for securing Purchases made by Protestants.'" (Repealed by Statute Law Revision Act 1861 (24 & 25 Vict. c. 101))
Finding of the Longitude at Sea Act 1781 (repealed)	21 Geo. 3. c. 52	5 July 1781
An Act for continuing the Encouragement and Reward of Persons making certain Discoveries for finding the Longitude at Sea, or making other useful Discoveries and Improvements in Navigation, and for making Experiments relating thereto. (Repealed by Statute Law Revision Act 1871 (34 & 35 Vict. c. 116))
Confirmation of Certain Marriages Act 1781 (repealed)	21 Geo. 3. c. 53	5 July 1781
An Act to render valid certain Marriages solemnized in certain Churches and Public Chapels in which Banns had not usually been published before, or at the Time of passing an Act made in the Twenty-sixth Year of King George the Second, intituled, "An Act for the better preventing of clandestine Marriages." (Note: Clandestine Marriages Act 1753 (26 Geo. 2. c. 33)) (Repealed by Statute Law (Repeals) Act 1977 (c. 18))
Coventry Freemen, etc. Act 1781 (repealed)	21 Geo. 3. c. 54	5 July 1781
An Act for the better regulating Elections of Citizens to serve in Parliament for the City of Coventry. (Repealed by Coventry Corporation Act 1927 (17 & 18 Geo. 5. c. xc) and Coventry Corporation Act 1940 (3 & 4 Geo. 6. c. xx))
Excise Act 1781 (repealed)	21 Geo. 3. c. 55	18 July 1781
An Act for repealing the Duties payable upon Chocolate made in Great Britain, and for granting certain Inland Duties upon Cocoa Nuts, in lieu thereof; for the better and more effectual securing the Revenue of Excise and of the Inland Duties, under the Management of the Commissioners of Excise, and for preventing Frauds therein; for the more punctual and ready Payment of the Allowances to be made to Brewers out of the additional Duties imposed on Malt, and for rectifying a Mistake in an Act made in this present Session of Parliament, (Note: Excise Duties Act 1781 (21 Geo. 3. c. 17)) with respect to the exempting of Candles from the additional Duty of Five Pounds per Centum upon the Duties of Excise imposed by the said Act. (Repealed by Statute Law Revision Act 1871 (34 & 35 Vict. c. 116))
Duty on Almanacks Act 1781 (repealed)	21 Geo. 3. c. 56	5 July 1781
An Act for granting to His Majesty an additional Duty upon Almanacks printed on One Side of any One Sheet or Piece of Paper, and for allowing a certain Annual Sum out of the said Duty to each of the Universities of Oxford and Cambridge, in lieu of the Money heretofore paid to the said Universities by the Company of Stationers of the City of London, for the Privilege of printing Almanacks. (Repealed by Statute Law Revision Act 1861 (24 & 25 Vict. c. 101))
Appropriation Act 1781 (repealed)	21 Geo. 3. c. 57	5 July 1781
An Act for granting to His Majesty a certain Sum of Money out of the Sinking Fund, and for applying certain Monies therein mentioned for the Service of the Year One thousand seven hundred and eighty one, and for further appropriating the Supplies granted in this Session of Parliament. (Repealed by Statute Law Revision Act 1871 (34 & 35 Vict. c. 116))
Growth of Hemp and Flax Act 1781 (repealed)	21 Geo. 3. c. 58	5 July 1781
An Act for rendering more effectual so much of an Act made in the Tenth Year of His Majesty's Reign, (Note: Hemp and Flax Act 1770 (10 Geo. 3. c. 40)) intituled, "An Act for appropriating a Fund established by an Act made in the Seventh Year of the Reign of His present Majesty, (Note: Customs Act 1767 (7 Geo. 3. c. 58)) for granting to His Majesty additional Duties on certain Foreign Linens, imported into this Kingdom, and for establishing a Fund for the encouraging of the raising and dressing of Hemp and Flax," as relates to the distributing and paying the Proportion of the Fund thereby appropriated for the Encouragement of the Growth of Hemp and Flax in that Part of Great Britain called England, by applying a Sum not exceeding Fifteen Thousand Pounds per Annum, out of the said Arrears and Duties, to the Purposes aforesaid, for a Time limited. (Repealed by Statute Law Revision Act 1871 (34 & 35 Vict. c. 116))
Loans or Exchequer Bills (No. 3) Act 1781 (repealed)	21 Geo. 3. c. 59	5 July 1781
An Act for enabling His Majesty to raise the Sum of One Million, for the Uses and Purposes therein mentioned. (Repealed by Statute Law Revision Act 1871 (34 & 35 Vict. c. 116))
Advance by Bank of England Act 1781 (repealed)	21 Geo. 3. c. 60	5 July 1781
An Act for establishing an Agreement with the Governor and Company of the Bank of England, for advancing the Sum of Two Millions, towards the Supply for the Service of the Year One thousand seven hundred and eighty-one. (Repealed by Statute Law Revision Act 1861 (24 & 25 Vict. c. 101))
Plymouth Fortifications Act 1781	21 Geo. 3. c. 61	18 July 1781
An Act to explain and amend so much of an Act, made in the Twentieth Year of the Reign of His present Majesty, intituled, "An Act to vest certain Messuages, Lands, Tenements and Hereditaments, in Trustees, for the better securing His Majesty's Docks, Ships and Stores, at Plymouth and Sheerness; and for better defending the Passage of the River Thames at Gravesend and Tilbury Fort," as relates to the Security of His Majesty's Docks, Ships and Stores at Plymouth.
Importation (No. 4) Act 1781 (repealed)	21 Geo. 3. c. 62	18 July 1781
An Act to explain and amend an Act, made in the Eighth and Ninth Years of the Reign of King William the Third, intituled, "An Act for the lessening the Duty upon Tin and Pewter exported, and granting an Equivalent for the same by a Duty upon Drugs," (Note: Duty on Tin Act 1696 (8 & 9 Will. 3. c. 34)) so far as the same relates to the Importation of Drugs from the Russian Dominions; and also an Act made in the Third Year of the Reign of His present Majesty, intituled, "An Act for the further Improvement of His Majesty's Revenue of Customs, and for the Encouragement of Officers making Seizures, and for the Prevention of the clandestine Running of Goods into any Part of His Majesty's Dominions;" (Note: Customs Act 1763 (3 Geo. 3. c. 22)) to permit the Importation of Orchillia Weed and Cobalt, during the present Hostilities, from any Place whatsoever, in British, Irish or Neutral Ships, and to permit Sugars, the Growth of Demerary and Essequibo, to be imported into Great Britain, upon Payment of the like Duties, and under the like Restrictions as Sugars of the British Islands in the West Indies. (Repealed by Customs Law Repeal Act 1825 (6 Geo. 4. c. 105))
Insolvent Debtors Relief Act 1781 (repealed)	21 Geo. 3. c. 63	18 July 1781
An Act for the Discharge of certain Insolvent Debtors. (Repealed by Statute Law Revision Act 1871 (34 & 35 Vict. c. 116))
Excise (No. 2) Act 1781 (repealed)	21 Geo. 3. c. 64	18 July 1781
An Act to rectify a Mistake in an Act made in this present Session of Parliament, (Note: Excise Act 1781 (21 Geo. 3. c. 55)) intituled, "An Act for repealing the Duties payable upon Chocolate made in Great Britain, and for granting certain Inland Duties upon Cocoa Nuts in lieu thereof; for the better and more effectual securing the Revenue of Excise, and of the Inland Duties under the Management of the Commissioners of Excise, and for preventing Frauds therein; for the more punctual and ready Payment of the Allowances to be made to Brewers out of the additional Duties imposed on Malt; and for rectifying a Mistake in an Act made in this present Session of Parliament, with respect to the exempting of Candles from the additional Duty of Five Pounds per Centum upon the Duties of Excise imposed by the said Act." (Repealed by Statute Law Revision Act 1871 (34 & 35 Vict. c. 116))
East India Company Act 1781 (repealed)	21 Geo. 3. c. 65	18 July 1781
An Act for establishing an Agreement with the United Company of Merchants of England trading to the East Indies, for the Payment of the Sum of Four hundred thousand Pounds, for the Use of the Public, in full Discharge and Satisfaction of all Claims and Demands of the Public, from the Time the Bond Debt of the said Company was reduced to One Million five hundred thousand Pounds, until the First Day of March One thousand seven hundred and eighty-one, in respect of the Territorial Acquisitions and Revenues lately obtained in the East Indies; and also, for securing to the Public in respect thereof, for a Term therein mentioned, a certain Part or Proportion of the clear Revenues and Profits of the said Company; and for granting to the said Company, for a further Term, the sole and exclusive Trade to and from the East Indies, and Limits therein mentioned; and for establishing certain Regulations for the better Management of the Affairs of the said Company, as well in India as in Europe; and the recruiting the Military Forces of the said Company. (Repealed by Statute Law Revision Act 1872 (35 & 36 Vict. c. 63))
Clergy Residences Repair Act 1780 or the Clergy Residences Repair Act 1781 (repealed)	21 Geo. 3. c. 66	18 July 1781
An Act to explain and amend an Act, made in the Seventeenth Year of the Reign of His present Majesty, intituled, "An Act to promote the Residence of the Parochial Clergy, by making Provision for the more speedy and effectual building, re-building, repairing or purchasing Houses, and other necessary Buildings and Tenements, for the Use of their Benefices." (Repealed by Endowments and Glebe Measure 1976 (No. 4))
Driving of Cattle, Metropolis Act 1781 (repealed)	21 Geo. 3. c. 67	18 July 1781
An Act to prevent the Mischiefs that arise from driving Cattle within the Cities of London and Westminster, and Liberties thereof, and Bills of Mortality. (Repealed by Statute Law Revision Act 1871 (34 & 35 Vict. c. 116))
Criminal Law Act 1781 (repealed)	21 Geo. 3. c. 68	18 July 1781
An Act to explain and amend an Act, made in the Fourth Year of the Reign of His late Majesty King George the Second, intituled, "An Act for the more effectual punishing Stealers of Lead and Iron Bars fixed to Houses, or any Fences belonging thereunto." (Note: Theft Act 1730 (4 Geo. 2. c. 32)) (Repealed by Statute Law Revision Act 1861 (24 & 25 Vict. c. 101))
Criminal Law (No. 2) Act 1781 (repealed)	21 Geo. 3. c. 69	18 July 1781
An Act to explain and amend an Act, made in the Twenty-ninth Year of the Reign of His late Majesty King George the Second, intituled, "An Act for more effectually discouraging and preventing the Stealing, and the buying and receiving of stolen Lead, Iron, Copper, Brass, Bell Metal and Solder, and for more effectually bringing the Offenders to Justice." (Note: Stealing of Lead, etc. Act 1756 (29 Geo. 2. c. 30)) (Repealed by Statute Law Revision Act 1861 (24 & 25 Vict. c. 101))
East India Company Act 1780 or the East India Company Act 1781 or the Declaration Act 1781 (repealed)	21 Geo. 3. c. 70	18 July 1781
An Act to explain and amend so much of an Act, made in the Thirteenth Year of the Reign of His present Majesty, intituled, "An Act for establishing certain Regulations for the better Management of the Affairs of the East India Company, as well in India as in Europe," (Note: East India Company Act 1772 (13 Geo. 3. c. 63)) as relates to the Administration of Justice in Bengal, and for the Relief of certain Persons imprisoned at Calcutta in Bengal, under a Judgement of the Supreme Court of Judicature; and also for indemnifying the Governor General and Council of Bengal, and all Officers who have acted under their Orders or Authority, in the undue Resistance made to the Process of the Supreme Court. (Repealed by Government of India Act 1915 (5 & 6 Geo. 5. c. 61) and Government of India Act 1935 (26 Geo. 5 & 1 Edw. 8. c. 2))
Saint Christopher-le-Stocks Church, London Act 1781 (repealed)	21 Geo. 3. c. 71	18 July 1781
An Act for vesting the Parish Church of Saint Christopher Le Stocks, in the City of London, and the Materials and Scite thereof, and the Church Yard thereto adjoining, in the Governor and Company of the Bank of England and their Successors for ever; and for uniting the said Parish to the Parish of Saint Margaret Lothbury in the said City. (Repealed by Statute Law (Repeals) Act 1995 (c. 44))
Plymouth (Poor Relief, etc.) Act 1781 (repealed)	21 Geo. 3. c. 72	19 June 1781
An Act for the better maintaining and regulating of the Poor within the Town of Plymouth Dock, and Parish of Stoke Damarell, in the County of Devon; and for paving, cleansing and watching the Streets, Lanes, and Passages, and removing and preventing Encroachments, Nuisances and Annoyances, and regulating the Drivers of Coaches, Chaises and Carts, and also Chairmen and Porters within the said Town. (Repealed by Plymouth and Stoke Damarel Poor Relief and Improvement Act 1814 (54 Geo. 3. c. clxxii))
Stepney and Hackney Manor Courts Act 1781 (repealed)	21 Geo. 3. c. 73	19 June 1781
An Act for diminishing the Fees payable, and altering the Mode of Proceeding in the Court of Record within the Manors of Stepney and Hackney, in the County of Middlesex, the Hamlets and Liberties of the same. (Repealed by County Courts Act 1846 (9 & 10 Vict. c. 95))
Gloucester Gaol Act 1781	21 Geo. 3. c. 74	5 July 1781
An Act for erecting a new Gaol, and for removing certain Gateways in the City of Gloucester, and for amending the several Acts passed for the Maintenance and Support of the Poor of the said City, and lighting, paving, and regulating the Streets there.
River Stower Navigation Act 1781 or the River Stour Navigation Act 1781	21 Geo. 3. c. 75	19 June 1781
An Act for appointing new Commissioners for continuing to carry into Execution the Trusts and Powers of an Act passed in the Fourth and Fifth Years of the Reign of Her late Majesty Queen Anne, intituled, "An Act for making the River Stower navigable, from the Town of Maningtree, in the County of Essex, to the Town of Sudbury, in the County of Suffolk," (Note: River Stower Navigation Act 1705 (4 & 5 Ann. c. 2)) in the Room and Place of those named in the said Act, who are since dead; and for explaining and amending the said Act; and for other Purposes therein mentioned.
Escrick Church, Yorkshire Act 1781	21 Geo. 3. c. 76	19 June 1781
An Act for building a new Church and Rectory House within the Parish of Escrick, in the County of York; and for confirming an Agreement with the Rector of the said Parish, for exchanging and exonerating from Tythes certain Lands and Tenements in Escrick aforesaid.
Oxford and Buckinghamshire Road Act 1781 (repealed)	21 Geo. 3. c. 77	12 March 1781
An Act for continuing the Term, and altering and enlarging the Powers of Two Acts, of the Ninth (Note: Berkshire and Oxfordshire Roads Act 1735 (9 Geo. 2. c. 14)) and Twenty-eighth (Note: Oxford and Buckinghamshire Roads Act 1755 (28 Geo. 2. c. 42)) Years of His late Majesty King George the Second, for amending and keeping in Repair, such Part of the Road described in the last mentioned Act, as leads from the End of Culham Bridge, (Note: Culham Bridge, off the A415 near Culham, Oxfordshire. 51°39′30″N 1°16′38″W) next to Culham, in the County of Oxford, to the End of Burford Bridge next to Abingdon, in the County of Berks, and from the Mayor's Stone at the End of Boar Street, in the Town of Abingdon aforesaid, to Shippon, in the said County of Berks; and from thence to the West End of the Town of Fyfield, in the same County. (Repealed by Culham, Abingdon and Fyfield Roads Act 1822 (3 Geo. 4. c. xxxvi))
Falmouth and Marazion Road Act 1781 (repealed)	21 Geo. 3. c. 78	12 March 1781
An Act to enlarge the Term and Powers of an Act, made in the First Year of the Reign of His present Majesty, (Note: Falmouth and Marazion Road Act 1760 (1 Geo. 3. c. 32)) for amending and widening the Road leading from the Town of Falmouth, in the County of Cornwall, through the Towns of Penryn, Hellstone and Marazion; and from thence to and over Marazion River and Bridge; and Two hundred Feet to the Westward of the said River and Bridge. (Repealed by Falmouth and Marazion Road Act 1823 (4 Geo. 4. c. lxxviii))
Linlithgow Roads Act 1781 (repealed)	21 Geo. 3. c. 79	12 March 1781
An Act for repairing and widening the Road leading from the Port of Borrowstounness, by the West of the Borough of Linlithgow, and by the Towns of Torphichen, Bathgate and Whiteburn, and from thence Southward to the Consines of the County of Linlithgow, at or near Hollhouseburn. (Repealed by Borrowstouness Roads Act 1816 (56 Geo. 3. c. lxxv))
Denbigh to Ruthland Road Act 1781 (repealed)	21 Geo. 3. c. 80	12 March 1781
An Act for more effectually repairing the Road leading from the Town of Denbigh to the Town of Saint Asaph and from thence to the Town and Port of Ruthland, in the Counties of Denbigh and Flint; and for repealing an Act, made in the Thirty-Second Year of His late Majesty King George the Second, (Note: Denbigh, Flint and Carnarvon Roads Act 1758 (32 Geo. 2. c. 55)) so far as the same relates to the said Road. (Repealed by Denbigh and Ruthland Road Act 1800 (39 & 40 Geo. 3. c. xxx), Road from Denbigh to Ruthland Act 1821 (1 & 2 Geo. 4. c. xx) and Annual Turnpike Acts Continuance Act 1875 (38 & 39 Vict. c. cxciv))
Derbyshire Roads Act 1781 (repealed)	21 Geo. 3. c. 81	12 March 1781
An Act for enlarging the Term and Powers of an Act, made in the Thirty-third Year of the Reign of His late Majesty King George the Second, intituled, "An Act for repairing and widening the Road, from the Turnpike Road near the West End of the Town of Chesterfield, to Matlock Bridge; and also the Road leading out of the said Road over Darley Bridge to Cross Green; and also the Road leading out of the last mentioned Road, to the Turnpike Road near Rowesley Bridge, in the County of Derby." (Note: Derbyshire Roads Act 1759 (33 Geo. 2. c. 39)) (Repealed by Roads from Chesterfield to Matlock Bridge Act 1823 (4 Geo. 4. c. xxviii))
Cheshire Roads Act 1781 (repealed)	21 Geo. 3. c. 82	29 March 1781
An Act for repairing and widening the Road from Wilmslow Bridge, in Wilmslow, (Note: Wilmslow Bridge over the River Bollin, on the B5166 Manchester Road, Wilmslow, Cheshire. The current bridge dates from 1834. 53°19′49″N 2°13′41″W) in the County of Chester, through Nether Alderley (Note: Congleton Road, through Nether Alderley, Cheshire. 53°16′56″N 2°14′10″W) and the Town of Congleton, (Note: Congleton, Cheshire.) to or near the Red Bull, (Note: The Red Bull Public House, south of the Trent and Mersey Canal on the A34 Congleton Road South, Church Lawton, Cheshire. 53°05′31″N 2°15′30″W) in Church Lawton, in the said County. (Repealed by Wilmslow Bridge and Church Lawton Road Act 1824 (5 Geo. 4. c. lxxxvii))
Derbyshire Roads (No. 2) Act 1781 (repealed)	21 Geo. 3. c. 83	18 May 1781
An Act for repairing, widening, and altering the Road, from the present Turnpike Road upon Greenhill Moor, near Norton, in the County of Derby, to Hathersage, in the same County, through the several Parishes of Norton, Dronfield, and Hathersage, in the said County of Derby; and also the Road from the Road leading from Chesterfield to Hernstone Lane Head, near Stoney Middleton, to Totley, through the several Parishes of Bakewell, Hope, Hathersage, and Dronfield, all in the said County of Derby. (Repealed by Roads in Derbyshire and Yorkshire Act 1803 (43 Geo. 3. c. lxx) and Road from Greenhill Moor (Derbyshire) Act 1825 (6 Geo. 4. c. ci))
Devon Roads Act 1781 (repealed)	21 Geo. 3. c. 84	12 March 1781
An Act for continuing the Term, and altering and enlarging the Powers of an Act, made in the Thirty-second Year of the Reign of His late Majesty King George the Second, (Note: Devon Roads (No. 2) Act 1758 (32 Geo. 2. c. 68)) for repairing and widening the Road from Modbury, through the Town of Plympton, to the North End of Lincotta Lane, in the County of Devon. (Repealed by Roads from Modbury through Plymouth Act 1823 (4 Geo. 4. c. cix) (Note: The regnal year is omitted in the Chronological Table of the Statutes, which cites this as "Geo. 4. c. cix".))
Leicester and Warwick Roads Act 1781 (repealed)	21 Geo. 3. c. 85	22 March 1781
An Act for enlarging the Term and Powers of an Act passed in the Second Year of the Reign of His present Majesty, intituled, "An Act for amending, widening and keeping in Repair several Roads therein mentioned, lying in the Counties of Leicester and Warwick, and in the County of the City of Coventry." (Note: Leicester, Warwick and Coventry Roads Act 1762 (2 Geo. 3. c. 80)) (Repealed by Watling Street, and Mancester (Warwickshire) and Wolvey Heath Road Act 1831 (1 Will. 4. c. xiv) and Coventry and Over Whitacre Road Act 1831 (1 Will. 4. c. xli))
Launceston Roads Act 1781 (repealed)	21 Geo. 3. c. 86	29 March 1781
An Act for continuing and amending an Act made in the Thirty-third Year of His late Majesty King George the Second, (Note: Launceston Roads Act 1759 (33 Geo. 2. c. 59)) for amending, widening and keeping in Repair, several Roads leading to the Borough of Launceston, in the County of Cornwall. (Repealed by Launceston Turnpike Roads Act 1835 (5 & 6 Will. 4. c. lxv))
Oxford Roads Act 1781 (repealed)	21 Geo. 3. c. 87	22 March 1781
An Act for repairing and widening the Road from a certain Gate on the Turnpike Road at or near the South End of the Town of Weston on the Green, in the County of Oxford, to the Turnpike Road on Kidlington Green, in the said County. (Repealed by Statute Law (Repeals) Act 2013 (c. 2))
Warwick and Worcester Roads Act 1781 (repealed)	21 Geo. 3. c. 88	12 March 1781
An Act for continuing the Term of an Act made in the Twenty-seventh Year of the Reign of His late Majesty, (Note: Warwick and Worcester Roads Act 1754 (27 Geo. 2. c. 36)) for repairing and widening the Roads from the Borough of Stratford-upon-Avon, in the County of Warwick, through Alcester in the said County, and Feckenham, to a Place called Bradley Brook, in the County of Worcester; and from Alcester through Great Coughton and Crabs Cross, in the said County of Warwick; and through Hewell Lane and Burcott, to The Cross of Hands, on a Common called The Leekhay; and out of Hewell Lane, through Church Lane and Tutnell, to Bromsgrove, in the said County of Worcester. (Repealed by Stratford-upon-Avon and Bradley Brook Roads Act 1821 (1 & 2 Geo. 4. c. xiii))
Leicester Roads Act 1781 (repealed)	21 Geo. 3. c. 89	11 April 1781
An Act to enlarge the Term and Powers of an Act passed in the Thirty-third Year of the Reign of His late Majesty King George the Second, (Note: Leicester Roads Act 1759 (33 Geo. 2. c. 41)) for amending, widening and keeping in Repair, the High Roads from the Borough of Tamworth to Ashby de-la-Zouch, in the County of Leicester; and from Sawley Ferry, in the said County, to a Turnpike Gate at or near the End of Swarcliff Lane, leading to and in the Parish of Ashby-de-la-Zouch aforesaid. (Repealed by Roads from Tamworth and from Harrington Bridge Act 1823 (4 Geo. 4. c. cxxii))
Cornwall Roads (No. 2) Act 1781 (repealed)	21 Geo. 3. c. 90	22 March 1781
An Act to enlarge the Term and Powers of an Act made in the First Year of the Reign of His present Majesty, (Note: Cornwall Roads Act 1760 (1 Geo. 3. c. 27)) for repairing and widening the Road leading from the Eastern End of the Borough of Grampound, in the County of Cornwall, through the Towns of Saint Austell and Lostwithiel; and from thence to the East End of the Western Taphouse Lane, in the said County. (Repealed by Grampound, St. Austell and Lostwithiel Road Act 1824 (5 Geo. 4. c. lxxxv) (Note: Incorrectly cited as "5 Geo. 4. c. lxxv" in the Chronological Table of the Statutes.))
Berwick Roads Act 1781 (repealed)	21 Geo. 3. c. 91	22 March 1781
An Act for enlarging the Term and Powers of so much of an Act made in the Thirty-third Year of the Reign of His late Majesty King George the Second, (Note: Durham Roads Act 1759 (33 Geo. 2. c. 56)) as relates to repairing and widening the Roads from Deanburn Bridge through Greenlaw, and Part of the Jedburgh Road, by Lauder, in the Shire of Berwick, to Cornhill, in the County of Durham. (Repealed by Road from Deanburn to Cornhill and Coldstream Bridge Act 1825 (6 Geo. 4. c. xli) (Note: Incorrectly cited as "6 Geo. 3. c. xli" in the Chronological Table of the Statutes.))
Derby, Leicester and Warwick Roads Act 1781 (repealed)	21 Geo. 3. c. 92	22 March 1781
An Act for continuing the Term, and altering and enlarging the Powers of an Act made in the Thirty-third Year of His late Majesty, (Note: Derby, Leicester and Warwick Roads Act 1759 (33 Geo. 2. c. 47)) for amending, widening and keeping in Repair several Roads therein mentioned, lying in the Counties of Derby, Leicester and Warwick; and for amending and keeping in Repair the Road branching from Part of the said Roads between Measham, in the said County of Derby, and Burton-upon-Trent, in the County of Stafford, to the Turnpike Road at or near the Bull's Head Alehouse, in Twycross, in the said County of Leicester. (Repealed by Burton Bridge and Market Bosworth Road Act 1831 (1 Will. 4. c. x) and Measham and Fieldon Bridge Road (Derbyshire, Warwickshire) Act 1831 (1 Will. 4. c. xii))
Worcestershire Staffordshire Shropshire Roads Act 1781	21 Geo. 3. c. 93	18 May 1781
An Act for continuing the Term, and altering and enlarging the Powers of so much of an Act made in the Second Year of the Reign of His present Majesty, (Note: Worcester and Salop Roads Act 1762 (2 Geo. 3. c. 78)) for amending and widening the Road from the Market House in Stourbridge, to Colly Gate in Cradley, and from Pedmore to Holly Hall, and from Colly Gate to Halesowen, and from the Turnpike Road on Dudley Wood to Rednal Green, in the Parish of King's Norton, and from Carter's Lane to the Bell Inn at Northfield, in the Counties of Worcester, Stafford, and Salop as relates to the Road from Dudley Wood to Rednal Green, and from Carter's Lane to the Bell Inn at Northfield.
Northamptonshire Roads Act 1781 (repealed)	21 Geo. 3. c. 94	29 March 1781
An Act for continuing the Term, and altering and enlarging the Powers of an Act made in the Twenty-seventh Year of His late Majesty, (Note: Bedford and Northamptonshire Roads Act 1754 (27 Geo. 2. c. 33)) for repairing and widening the High Road from Westwood Gate, in the Parish of Knotting, in the County of Bedford, through the Towns of Rushden and Higham Ferrers, and over Artleborough Bridge, to the Turnpike Road in Barton Seagrave Lane, in the Parish of Barton Seagrave, in the County of Northampton. (Repealed by Bedford and Barton Seagrave Road Act 1822 (3 Geo. 4. c. lxxxvi) and Annual Turnpike Acts Continuance Act 1876 (39 & 40 Vict. c. 39))
Skipton Roads Act 1781 (repealed)	21 Geo. 3. c. 95	18 May 1781
An Act for continuing the Term, and altering and enlarging the Powers of so much of an Act made in the Twenty-eighth Year of the Reign of His late Majesty King George the Second, (Note: Leeds to Otley Road Act 1755 (28 Geo. 2. c. 60)) for repairing and widening certain Roads therein described, as relate to the Roads from Otley to Skipton, in the County of York, from Skipton to Colne, in the County of Lancaster, and from Skipton to Clitheroe, in the said County. (Repealed by Skipton and Clitheroe Road Act 1799 (39 Geo. 3. c. lii), Road from Otley to Skipton Act 1823 (4 Geo. 4. c. xxxi) and Skipton and Colne Road Act 1823 (4 Geo. 4. c. cx) (Note: The regnal year is given incompletely in the Chronological Table of the Statutes, which cites this as "4 Geo. c. cx".))
Yorkshire Roads Act 1781 (repealed)	21 Geo. 3. c. 96	18 May 1781
An Act for continuing and amending an Act made in the Twenty-eighth Year of the Reign of His late Majesty, (Note: Yorkshire Roads Act 1755 (28 Geo. 2. c. 50)) for amending and widening the Roads from the West End of Toller Lane, near Bradford, through Haworth, in the County of York, to a Place called Blue Bell, near Colne, in the County of Lancaster, and from a Place called The Two Laws to Kighley, in the said County of York. (Repealed by Roads from Toller Lane near Bradford and from the Two Laws Act 1823 (4 Geo. 4. c. xlviii))
Henley to Oxford Road Act 1781 (repealed)	21 Geo. 3. c. 97	18 May 1781
An Act for enlarging the Term and Powers of Two Acts passed in the Ninth and Twenty eighth Years of the Reign of His late Majesty King George the Second, for repairing and widening certain Roads therein described, so far as the same relate to the Road from Henley Bridge, (Note: Henley Bridge in Henley-on-Thames. 51°32′15″N 0°54′01″W) in the County of Oxford, to Dorchester Bridge, and from thence to Culham Bridge, and to a Place called Mile Stone, in the Road leading to Magdalen Bridge, in the said County. (Repealed by Henley-on-Thames, Dorchester and Oxford Roads Act 1821 (1 & 2 Geo. 4. c. xxvi))
Leeds to Otley Road Act 1781 (repealed)	21 Geo. 3. c. 98	18 May 1781
An Act to enlarge the Term and Powers of an Act passed in the Twenty-eighth Year of the Reign of His late Majesty King George the Second, for repairing several Roads, so far as relates to the Road from Leeds to Otley, in the West Riding of the County of York. (Repealed by Road from Leeds to Otley Act 1821 (1 & 2 Geo. 4. c. xciv))
Addingham to Black Lane End Road Act 1781 (repealed)	21 Geo. 3. c. 99	18 May 1781
An Act for continuing the Term of an Act made in the Twenty-eighth Year of the Reign of His late Majesty, (Note: Yorkshire and Lancaster Roads Act 1755 (28 Geo. 2. c. 59)) for repairing, widening, and mending, the Road from Cocking End, near Addingham, in the West Riding of the County of York, through Kildwick, to Black Lane End, in the County Palatine of Lancaster. (Repealed by Blackburn, Addingham and Cocking End Road Act 1810 (50 Geo. 3. c. xxxvi))
Kent and Surrey Roads Act 1781 (repealed)	21 Geo. 3. c. 100	18 May 1781
An Act for more effectually repairing the Road leading from the Stones End in Kent Street, in the Parish of Saint George Southwark, to Dartford, and other Roads therein mentioned, in the Counties of Kent and Surrey, and for other Purposes. (Repealed by Roads in Kent and Surrey Act 1802 (42 Geo. 3. c. lxiii))
Berkshire and Wiltshire Roads Act 1781 (repealed)	21 Geo. 3. c. 101	19 June 1781
An Act to enlarge the Term and Powers of Two Acts, passed in the Eleventh (Note: Berkshire and Wiltshire Roads Act 1771 (11 Geo. 3. c. 97)) and Twelfth (Note: Berkshire Roads Act 1772 (12 Geo. 3. c. 104)) Years of His present Majesty, for amending and widening the Road from Besselsleigh, through Wantage to Hungerford, in the County of Berks, and from Wantage to Marlborough, in the County of Wilts, and from the Turnpike Road between Reading and Wallingford, through Halfpenny Lane, to the Old Red House upon Wantage Downs, and from thence to Lambourn in the said County of Berks; and for amending the Road through Pidgeon Lane instead of the said Road through Halfpenny Lane. (Repealed by Besselsleigh Road Act 1858 (21 & 22 Vict. c. xlii))
Leeds and Blackburn Roads Act 1781 (repealed)	21 Geo. 3. c. 102	19 June 1781
An Act to continue the Term, and alter and enlarge the Powers of so much of an Act, made in the Twenty-eighth Year of the Reign of His late Majesty King George the Second, intituled, "An Act for repairing and widening the Roads from the Town of Leeds, in the West Riding of the County of York, through Otley, Skipton, Colne, Burnley and Blackburn, to Burscough Bridge in Walton, in the County of Lancaster, and from Skipton, through Gisburn and Clitheroe to Preston, in the said County of Lancaster," as relates to the Roads from Colne to Blackburn, and from Blackburn to Burscough Bridge. (Repealed by Blackburn to Burscough Bridge Road Act 1793 (33 Geo. 3. c. 134) and Blackburn and Addingham Road Act 1796 (36 Geo. 3. c. 137))
Kettering to Newport Pagnell Road Act 1781 (repealed)	21 Geo. 3. c. 103	19 June 1781
An Act for enabling the Trustees for executing Two Acts, made in the Twenty-seventh Year of the Reign of King George the Second, (Note: Kettering to Newport Pagnell Road Act 1754 (27 Geo. 2. c. 31)) and in the Thirteenth Year of the Reign of His present Majesty, (Note: Kettering to Newport Pagnell Road Act 1773 (13 Geo. 3. c. 87)) for repairing the Road from Kettering, in the County of Northampton, to Newport Pagnell, in the County of Bucks, to take down the Turnpike erected in Sherrington Field, in the said County of Bucks, and to remove the same to the North End of Sherrington Bridge in the said County. (Repealed by Road from Kettering to Newport Pagnell Act 1823 (4 Geo. 4. c. lxvii))
Somerset Roads Act 1781 (repealed)	21 Geo. 3. c. 104	19 June 1781
An Act for more effectually amending, widening, and keeping in Repair the Roads from the East End of the Town of Chard, to the South End of West Moor, and from the West End of the Yeovil Turnpike Road, through Ilmister to Kenny Gate, and from the West End of Pease Marsh Lane to Horton Elm, and from Saint Rane Hill to Ilmister, and from White Cross to Chillington Down, and from a Place called Three Oaks, over Ilford Bridges, to Bridge Cross, in the County of Somerset. (Repealed by Road from Chard Act 1803 (43 Geo. 3. c. xxiii))
Hereford Roads Act 1781 (repealed)	21 Geo. 3. c. 105	19 June 1781
An Act for continuing the Term of an Act made in the Thirty-second Year of the Reign of His late Majesty King George the Second, (Note: Hereford and Salop Roads Act 1758 (32 Geo. 2. c. 66)) intituled, "An Act for amending and widening the Roads leading from Stretford's Bridge, in the County of Hereford, to the New Inn, in the Parish of Winstantow, in the County of Salop; and also the Road from Blue Mantle Hall, near Mortimer's Cross to Aymstrey, in the said County of Hereford; and for repealing so much of an Act made in the Twenty-second Year of the Reign of His present Majesty, (Note: Leominster Roads Act 1748 (22 Geo. 2. c. 15)) as relates to the Road from Mortimer's Cross to Aymstrey Bridge." (Repealed by Stretford's Bridge and Cross Moor Roads (Herefordshire and Salop.) Act 1824 (5 Geo. 4. c. cxlii) (Note: Incorrectly cited as "5 Geo. 4. c. cxliii" in the Chronological Table of the Statutes.))
Warwick and Northampton Roads Act 1781 (repealed)	21 Geo. 3. c. 106	5 July 1781
An Act for more effectually repairing the Road from the Dun Cow, in the Town of Dunchurch, to the Town of Hillmorton, in the County of Warwick, and from thence to Saint James's End, in the Parish of Duston, in the County of Northampton, and for repealing the several Laws now in force relating to the said Road. (Repealed by Road from Dunchurch to Duston (Warwickshire) Act 1806 (46 Geo. 3. c. lxix))

=== Private acts ===
Short title	Citation	Royal assent
Long title
Pope's Naturalization Act 1781	21 Geo. 3. c. 1 Pr.	27 November 1780
An Act for naturalizing Simeon Pope.
Naturalization of John Kern and Nathaniel Paleske Act 1781	21 Geo. 3. c. 2 Pr.	27 November 1780
An Act for naturalizing John Frederick Kern and Nathaniel Lewis Paleske.
Shotesham St. Mary, Shotesham St. Botolph, Shotesham All Saints and Shotesham St. Martin's (Norfolk) Inclosure Act 1781	21 Geo. 3. c. 3 Pr.	12 March 1781
An Act for dividing and enclosing the Commons and Waste Lands in the Parishes of Shotesham Saint Mary, Shotesham Saint Botolph, Shotesham All Saints and Shotesham Saint Martin's, in the County of Norfolk.
Highclere and Burghclere (Hampshire) Inclosure Act 1781	21 Geo. 3. c. 4 Pr.	12 March 1781
An Act for dividing and enclosing the Open Arable Fields, Commons and Waste Lands, in the Manors and Parishes of Highclere and Burghclere, in the County of Southampton.
Hingham Inclosure Act 1781	21 Geo. 3. c. 5 Pr.	12 March 1781
An Act for dividing and enclosing the Commons and Waste Lands within the Parish of Hingham, in the County of Norfolk.
Great Ringstead Inclosure Act 1781	21 Geo. 3. c. 6 Pr.	12 March 1781
An Act for exchanging, dividing, allotting and enclosing the Lands and Grounds called Whole Year Lands, Half Year Enclosures, Open Field Lands, Brecks, Commons and Wastes in Great Ringstead, in the County of Norfolk.
West Halton Inclosure Act 1781	21 Geo. 3. c. 7 Pr.	12 March 1781
An Act for enclosing and improving certain Lands and Grounds within the Township of West Halton, in the Parish of Long Preston, in the West Riding of the County of York.
Dame Charlotte Smyth: naturalization, and also enabling her to enjoy a jointure by way of rentcharge, limited to her upon her marriage.	21 Geo. 3. c. 8 Pr.	12 March 1781
An Act for naturalizing Dame Charlotte Sophia Smyth, Wife of Sir Robert Smyth Baronet; and for qualifying and enabling her to hold and enjoy a Rent Charge, limited to her upon her Marriage in the Name of her Jointure.
Kater's Naturalization Act 1781	21 Geo. 3. c. 9 Pr.	12 March 1781
An Act for naturalizing John Herman Kater.
Naturalization of John Ziegenbein and Charles Pieschell Act 1781	21 Geo. 3. c. 10 Pr.	12 March 1781
An Act for naturalizing John Engelberts Ziegenbein, and Charles Augustus Pieschell.
Kohn's Naturalization Act 1781	21 Geo. 3. c. 11 Pr.	12 March 1781
An Act for naturalizing George Lewis Kohn.
Chasseaud's Naturalization Act 1781	21 Geo. 3. c. 12 Pr.	12 March 1781
An Act for naturalizing Peter Chasseaud.
Naturalization of James Siordet and John Hooffstetter Act 1781	21 Geo. 3. c. 13 Pr.	12 March 1781
An Act for naturalizing James Mary Siordet and John Lewis Hooffstetter.
Chicklade Inclosure Act 1781	21 Geo. 3. c. 14 Pr.	22 March 1781
An Act for dividing and enclosing the Common Fields, Common Downs, Waste Lands and Commonable Places, of and within the Parish of Chicklade, in the County of Wilts.
Dilhorne Inclosure Act 1781	21 Geo. 3. c. 15 Pr.	22 March 1781
An Act for dividing and enclosing the several Commons and Waste Grounds within the Manor and Parish of Dillorn, otherwise Dilhorne, in the County of Stafford.
Stoney Middleton Inclosure Act 1781	21 Geo. 3. c. 16 Pr.	29 March 1781
An Act for dividing and enclosing the several Commons and Waste Grounds within the Manor of Stoney Middleton, in the County of Derby.
Ilmington (Warwickshire) Inclosure Act 1781	21 Geo. 3. c. 17 Pr.	11 April 1781
An Act for dividing and enclosing the Open and Common Fields, and other Commonable Land, within the Parish of Ilmington, in the County of Warwick.
Rothley and Rothley Temple (Leicestershire) Inclosure Act 1781	21 Geo. 3. c. 18 Pr.	11 April 1781
An Act for dividing and enclosing the Open and Common Fields, Common Meadows, Common Pastures, and other Commonable Lands and Grounds, as well within the Parish and Township of Rothley, as within the Extra-parochial Liberty of Rothley Temple, in the County of Leicester.
Little Harrowden Inclosure Act 1781	21 Geo. 3. c. 19 Pr.	11 April 1781
An Act for dividing and enclosing the Common and Open Fields, Meadows, Commonable Lands and Waste Grounds, in the Parish of Little Harrowden, in the County of Northampton.
Tripe Name Act 1781	21 Geo. 3. c. 20 Pr.	11 April 1781
An Act to enable John Tripe, Clerk, and the Heirs Male of his Body, to take and use the Surname and Arms of Swete.
Page's Estate Act 1781	21 Geo. 3. c. 21 Pr.	18 May 1781
An Act for vesting Part of the Freehold Estates in the County of Kent, devised by the Will of Sir Gregory Page, Baronet, deceased, in Trustees, to sell the same for discharging Incumbrances, and for laying out the Residue of the Money arising by Sale in the Purchase of other Lands and Hereditaments, to be settled in lieu thereof to the like Uses, and for the other Purposes therein mentioned.
Blackford (Somerset) Inclosure Act 1781	21 Geo. 3. c. 22 Pr.	18 May 1781
An Act for dividing and enclosing certain Moors, Commons, or Tracts of Commonable Land, called or known by the Names of Tealbam Moor, Blackford Moor, Blackford Ham, and Hare Pit, within the Manor of Blackford, in the Parish of Wedmore, in the County of Somerset.
Winfarthing (Norfolk) Inclosure Act 1781	21 Geo. 3. c. 23 Pr.	18 May 1781
An Act for dividing and enclosing the Lammas Meadows, Heaths, Commons, and Waste Lands, within the Parish of Winsarthing, in the County of Norfolk.
Mountsorrell (Leicestershire) Inclosure Act 1781	21 Geo. 3. c. 24 Pr.	18 May 1781
An Act for dividing, allotting, and enclosing, the Open Fields, Commonable Grounds and Places, of and within the Manor, Lordship, and Liberties of Mountsorrell, in the County of Leicester.
Naturalization of Dorothy Hannah Louisa Harriot Henley.	21 Geo. 3. c. 25 Pr.	18 May 1781
An Act for naturalizing Dorothy Hannah Louisa, Harriot Henley, the Wife of William Henley Esquire.
Earl of Radnor's Estate Act 1781	21 Geo. 3. c. 26 Pr.	19 June 1781
An Act for vesting several Lands and Hereditaments therein mentioned, of which Jacob Earl of Radnor is Tenant for Life, in Trustees, to be sold, and for laying out the Monies to arise therefrom in the Purchase of other Lands and Hereditaments, to be settled to the like Uses instead thereof.
Vicarage of Halifax Estate Act 1781	21 Geo. 3. c. 27 Pr. (Note: This act was given royal assent using the form of words used for a public act.)	18 May 1781
An Act for vesting Part of a certain Close called Shack Field, otherwise Vicar's Field, Parcel of the Lands belonging to the Vicarage of Halifax, in the County of York, in Trustees, for the Purpose of making a convenient Road from a Street called Southgate, in the Town of Halifax, over and through the said Close, to the Public Hall lately erected in the said Town of Halifax, called The Manufacturers Hall; and to enable the Vicar of the Parish of Halifax and his Successors, to grant Building Leases of the other Parts of the said Close, and for the other Purposes therein mentioned.
Earl of Salisbury's Estate Act 1781	21 Geo. 3. c. 28 Pr.	19 June 1781
An Act for diversting the Inheritance in Fee Simple, of divers Manors, Messuages, Farms, Rectories, Advowsons, Lands, Tenements, Tythes, Rents, and Hereditaments of the Right Honourable James Earl of Salisbury, out of Charles Banks, and his Heirs; and for vesting the same in Trustees, and their Heirs, to, for, and upon such of the several Uses, Trusts, Powers, Provisoes, Ends, Intents, and Purposes, mentioned and declared in and by an Indenture of Release of the Nineteenth Day of June One thousand seven Hundred and twenty-eight, as remain to be performed, or are capable of taking Effect.
Mapes's Estate Act 1781	21 Geo. 3. c. 29 Pr.	19 June 1781
An Act for vesting Part of the Settled Estates of Edmund Mapes Esquire, in Honeing, in the County of Norfolk, in the said Edmund Mapes, in Fee-Simple; and for settling an Estate of the said Edmund Mapes, in Rollesby Burgh alias Burrow and Repps, in the same County, of greater Value in lieu thereof.
Radcliffe's Estate Act 1781	21 Geo. 3. c. 30 Pr.	19 June 1781
An Act for vesting divers Messuages, Lands, and Hereditaments, in the Counties of Sussex and Kent, being Part of the Settled Estates of John Radcliffe, of Hitchin, in the County of Hertford, Esquire, in Trustees, to be sold, and for laying out the Money arising by such Sale, in the Purchase of other Messuages, Lands, and Hereditaments, situate and being in the Counties of Hertford and Bedford, or one of them, to be settled in lieu thereof to the like Uses.
Baker's Estate Act 1781	21 Geo. 3. c. 31 Pr.	19 June 1781
An Act for vesting Part of the Settled Estate of John Baker Esquire, in Folkestone, in the County of Kent, in the said John Baker in Fee-Simple; and for settling another Estate of the said John Baker, in the said County of Kent, of equal Value, in lieu thereof.
Ann Fairfax's Estate Act 1781	21 Geo. 3. c. 32 Pr.	19 June 1781
An Act to confirm and establish an Agreement for cancelling and making void a Settlement of certain Manors, Messuages, Lands, and Hereditaments, in the North Riding of the County of York, the Estates of the Honourable Ann Fairfax Spinster; and for making another Settlement of the same Manors, Messuages, Lands, and Hereditaments, to the Uses mentioned in such Agreement.
Sale of Ann Pinnock's estate at New Windsor (Berkshire) pursuant to an agrement with Thomas Tildesly.	21 Geo. 3. c. 33 Pr.	19 June 1781
An Act for effectuating the Sale of a Freehold Estate of Ann Pinnock an Infant, at New Windsor, in the County of Berks, pursuant to an Agreement with Thomas Tildesley Gentleman.
Exchange of estates in Staffordshire and Salop. between John and William Pratchitt, and other provisions.	21 Geo. 3. c. 34 Pr.	19 June 1781
An Act for effecting an Exchange between John Pratchitt and William Pratchitt Gentlemen, of their Estates in the Counties of Stafford and Salop; and for other Purposes therein mentioned.
Lord Baltimore's Estate Act 1781	21 Geo. 3. c. 35 Pr.	19 June 1781
An Act for confirming and carrying into Execution certain Articles of Agreement, made between the Devisee and Heirs at Law of Frederick Lord Baltimore deceased, respecting the Province of Maryland, in America, and for other the Purposes therein mentioned; and for the establishing and vesting the said Province in Henry Harford Esquire, and his Heirs, upon the several Payments, Terms, and Conditions, and in Manner therein mentioned.
Mark Inclosure Act 1781	21 Geo. 3. c. 36 Pr.	19 June 1781
An Act for dividing, allotting, and enclosing certain Moors, Commons, and Waste Lands, called Mark Moor, otherwise Thurll Moor, Mark Liberty Moor, otherwise Yonder Moor, and Fole Moors and Commons situate within the Parish of Mark, in the County of Somerset.
Dale and Stanton (Derbyshire) Inclosure Act 1781	21 Geo. 3. c. 37 Pr.	19 June 1781
An Act for dividing and enclosing a certain Common, called Dale Moor, or Stanton Moor, within the Manors of Dale and Stanton, or one of them, in the County of Derby.
Eynsham Inclosure Act 1781	21 Geo. 3. c. 38 Pr.	19 June 1781
An Act for enclosing certain Lands within the Parish of Ensham, in the County of Oxford, and for setting out and regulating Part thereof as a Common Pasture; and for extinguishing all Right of Common upon certain enclosed Lands within the said Parish.
Grinshill, Sansaw, and Clive (Salop.) Inclosure Act 1781	21 Geo. 3. c. 39 Pr.	19 June 1781
An Act for dividing and enclosing the Commons or Waste Lands in the Townships of Grinshill, Sansaw, and Clive, in the Parishes of Grinshill and Saint Mary, in the County of Salop.
Cropston in Thurcaston (Leicestershire) Inclosure Act 1781	21 Geo. 3. c. 40 Pr.	19 June 1781
An Act for dividing, allotting, and enclosing the Open Fields and other uninclosed Lands, Meadows, and Commonable Places of and belonging to Cropston, in the Parish of Thurcaston, and County of Leicester.
Hanbury Inclosure Act 1781	21 Geo. 3. c. 41 Pr.	5 July 1781
An Act for dividing and enclosing certain Commons and Waste Grounds within the Parish of Hanbury, in the County of Worcester.
Kington Inclosure Act 1781	21 Geo. 3. c. 42 Pr.	5 July 1781
An Act for dividing and enclosing the Open and Common Fields, Meadows, Pastures, and other Commonable Land within the Manor and Parish of Kington, in the County of Worcester.
Preston Bissett Inclosure Act 1781	21 Geo. 3. c. 43 Pr.	5 July 1781
An Act for dividing and enclosing the Open and Common Field, and other Commonable Lands and Grounds lying within, and belonging to, the Manor and Parish of Preston Bissett, in the County of Bucks.

=== Sources ===
- Pickering, Danby, ed. (1780). "Anno vicesimo primo Georgii III". The Statutes at Large. Vol. 33. Cambridge: Charles Bathurst. pp. 181–466 – via Internet Archive.
- Pickering, Danby, ed. (1780). "Anno vicesimo primo Georgii III". The Statutes at Large. Vol. 33. Cambridge: Charles Bathurst. pp. 181–466 – via Google Books.
- Journals of the House of Commons. Vol. 38. London: His Majesty's Stationery Office. 1803. pp. 5–566 – via Google Books.
- Chronological Table of and Index to the Statutes. Vol. 1: To the End of the Session 59 Vict. Sess. 2 (1895) (13th ed.). London: Her Majesty's Stationery Office. 1896. pp. 138–139 – via Google Books.

== See also ==
- List of acts of the Parliament of Great Britain
