= Papists Act =

Papists Act may refer to any of the following Acts of Parliament:

- Papists Act 1688
- Papists Act 1715
- Papists Act 1716
- Papists Act 1722
- Papists Act 1732
- Papists Act 1734
- Papists Act 1737
- Papists Act 1738
- Papists Act 1740
- Papists Act 1742
- Papists Act 1778
