= List of acts of the Parliament of Great Britain from 1734 =

This is a complete list of acts of the Parliament of Great Britain for the year 1734.

For acts passed until 1707, see the list of acts of the Parliament of England and the list of acts of the Parliament of Scotland. See also the list of acts of the Parliament of Ireland.

For acts passed from 1801 onwards, see the list of acts of the Parliament of the United Kingdom. For acts of the devolved parliaments and assemblies in the United Kingdom, see the list of acts of the Scottish Parliament, the list of acts of the Northern Ireland Assembly, and the list of acts and measures of Senedd Cymru; see also the list of acts of the Parliament of Northern Ireland.

The number shown after each act's title is its chapter number. Acts are cited using this number, preceded by the year(s) of the reign during which the relevant parliamentary session was held; thus the Union with Ireland Act 1800 is cited as "39 & 40 Geo. 3. c. 67", meaning the 67th act passed during the session that started in the 39th year of the reign of George III and which finished in the 40th year of that reign. Note that the modern convention is to use Arabic numerals in citations (thus "41 Geo. 3" rather than "41 Geo. III"). Acts of the last session of the Parliament of Great Britain and the first session of the Parliament of the United Kingdom are both cited as "41 Geo. 3".

Acts passed by the Parliament of Great Britain did not have a short title; however, some of these acts have subsequently been given a short title by acts of the Parliament of the United Kingdom (such as the Short Titles Act 1896).

Before the Acts of Parliament (Commencement) Act 1793 came into force on 8 April 1793, acts passed by the Parliament of Great Britain were deemed to have come into effect on the first day of the session in which they were passed. Because of this, the years given in the list below may in fact be the year before a particular act was passed.

== 8 Geo. 2 ==
The first session of the 8th Parliament of Great Britain, which met from 14 January 1735 until 15 May 1735.

This session was also traditionally cited as 8 G. 2.

=== Public acts ===
Short title	Citation	Royal assent
Long title
Taxation Act 1734 (repealed)	8 Geo. 2. c. 1	28 February 1735
An Act for continuing the Duties upon Malt, Mum, Cyder, and Perry, in that Part of Great Britain called England; and for granting to His Majesty certain Duties upon Malt, Mum, Cyder, and Perry, in that Part of Great Britain called Scotland, for the Service of the Year One Thousand Seven Hundred and Thirty-five. (Repealed by Statute Law Revision Act 1867 (30 & 31 Vict. c. 59))
Mutiny Act 1734 (repealed)	8 Geo. 2. c. 2	24 March 1735
An Act to punish Mutiny and Desertion; and for the better Payment of the Army and their Quarters. (Repealed by Statute Law Revision Act 1867 (30 & 31 Vict. c. 59))
Yorkshire and Lancashire Roads Act 1734 (repealed)	8 Geo. 2. c. 3	24 March 1735
An Act for repairing the Roads from the Town of Manchester, leading through Newton, Failsworth, and Oldham, in the County Palatine of Lancaster, to Austerlands, in the Parish of Saddleworth, in the County of York. (Repealed by Manchester Roads Act 1771 (11 Geo. 3. c. 82))
Indemnity Act 1734 (repealed)	8 Geo. 2. c. 4	24 March 1735
An Act to indemnify Persons who have omitted to make and subscribe the Declarations contained in the Act of Uniformity of the Thirteenth and Fourteenth Years of King Charles the Second, (Note: Act of Uniformity 1662 (14 Cha. 2. c. 4)) within the Time limited by Law; and for allowing further Time for doing thereof. (Repealed by Statute Law Revision Act 1867 (30 & 31 Vict. c. 59))
Tittensor Turnpike Act Act 1734 (repealed)	8 Geo. 2. c. 5	24 March 1735
An Act for enlarging the Term and Powers granted by an Act made in the Twelfth and Thirteenth Year of the Reign of Her late Majesty Queen Anne, intituled, "An Act for repairing and amending the Highways between the Town or Village of Tittensor, and the most Northern Part of Talk on the Hill, in Butt Lane, in the County of Stafford." (Note: Tittensor Turnpike Act 1713 (13 Ann. c. 31)) (Repealed by Darlaston Turnpike Act 1779 (19 Geo. 3. c. 119))
Yorkshire (North Riding) Deeds Registry Act 1734 (repealed)	8 Geo. 2. c. 6	15 May 1735
An Act for the public registering of all Deeds, Conveyances, Wills, and other Incumbrances, that shall be made of, or that may affect, any Honours, Manors, Lands, Tenements, or Hereditaments, within the North Riding of the County of York, after the Nine and Twentieth Day of September, One Thousand Seven Hundred and Thirty-six. (Repealed by Yorkshire Registries Act 1884 (47 & 48 Vict. c. 54))
Rochdale, Halifax and Ealand Road Act 1734 (repealed)	8 Geo. 2. c. 7	15 May 1735
An Act for repairing and widening the Road from the Town of Rochdale, in the County Palatine of Lancaster, leading over a certain craggy Mountain, called Blackstone Edge, in the same County; and from thence to the Towns of Hallifax and Ealand, in the County of York. (Repealed by Rochdale, Halifax and Ealand Road Act 1836 (6 & 7 Will. 4. c. viii))
Marylebone Road Act 1734 (repealed)	8 Geo. 2. c. 8	15 May 1735
An Act for enlarging the Term and Powers granted by an Act passed in the Seventh Year of the Reign of His late Majesty King George the First, (Note: Marylebone Road Act 1720 (7 Geo. 1. St. 1. c. 26)) for repairing the Road from St. Giles's Pound, (Note: St Giles's Pound, at the corner of Oxford Street and Tottenham Court Road.) to Kilbourn Bridge, (Note: Kilburn Bridge was located where the Edgware Road (Kilburn High Road) crossed the River Westbourne. The river is now culverted. 51°32′08″N 0°11′25″W) in the County of Middlesex; and for paving that Part of the Road called Oxford Street. (Repealed by Metropolis Roads Act 1826 (7 Geo. 4. c. cxlii))
Hertfordshire and Middlesex Roads Act 1734 (repealed)	8 Geo. 2. c. 9	15 May 1735
An Act for continuing and making more effectual an Act passed in the First Year of the Reign of His late Majesty King George the First, intituled, "An Act for repairing the Highways through the several Parishes of St. Michael, St. Alban, St. Peter, Shendley Ridge, and South Mims, in the Counties of Hertford and Middlesex;" (Note: Hertford and Middlesex Highways Act 1715 (1 Geo. 1. St. 2. c. 12 Pr.)) and for continuing the Commissioners authorized to put the said Act in Execution. (Repealed by Hertford and Middlesex Roads Act 1791 (31 Geo. 3. c. 108))
Whitby Harbour Act 1734 (repealed)	8 Geo. 2. c. 10	15 May 1735
An Act for lengthening the West Pier of the Harbour of Whitby, in the County of York; and for improving the said Harbour. (Repealed by Whitby Piers and Harbour Act 1827 (7 & 8 Geo. 4. c. lxxviii))
Supply, etc. Act 1734 (repealed)	8 Geo. 2. c. 11	15 May 1735
An Act for enabling His Majesty to apply the Sum of One Million, out of the Sinking Fund, for the Service of the Year One Thousand Seven Hundred and Thirty-five. (Repealed by Statute Law Revision Act 1867 (30 & 31 Vict. c. 59))
Salt Duties, etc. Act 1734 (repealed)	8 Geo. 2. c. 12	15 May 1735
An Act for granting and continuing the Duties upon Salt, and upon Red and White Herrings, for the further Term of Four Years; and for giving further Time for the Payment of Duties omitted to be paid for the Indentures and Contracts of Clerks and Apprentices. (Repealed by Statute Law Revision Act 1867 (30 & 31 Vict. c. 59))
Engraving Copyright Act 1734 or the Engravers' Copyright Act 1734 or Hogarth's Act (repealed)	8 Geo. 2. c. 13	15 May 1735
An Act for the Encouragement of the Arts of designing, engraving, and etching, Historical and other Prints, by vesting the Property thereof in the Inventors and Engravers, during the Time therein mentioned. (Repealed by Copyright Act 1911 (1 & 2 Geo. 5. c. 46))
Charitable Corporation Lottery Act 1734 (repealed)	8 Geo. 2. c. 14	15 May 1735
An Act for prolonging the Time for claiming the fortunate Tickets in the Charitable Corporation Lottery; and for making Provision for Tickets in the said Lottery lost, burnt, or otherwise destroyed. (Repealed by Statute Law Revision Act 1867 (30 & 31 Vict. c. 59))
Night Watch (Westminster) Act 1734 (repealed)	8 Geo. 2. c. 15	15 May 1735
An Act for the better regulating the Nightly Watch and Beadles, within the Two Parishes of St. James and St. George Hanover Square, within the Liberties of the City of Westminster. (Repealed by London Government (City of Westminster) Order in Council 1901 (SR&O 1901/278))
Hue and Cry Act 1734 (repealed)	8 Geo. 2. c. 16	15 May 1735
An Act for the Amendment of the Law relating to Actions on the Statute of Hue and Cry. (Repealed for England and Wales by Criminal Statutes Repeal Act 1827 (7 & 8 Geo. 4. c. 27) and for India by Criminal Law (India) Act 1828 (9 Geo. 4. c. 74))
Indemnity (No. 2) Act 1734 (repealed)	8 Geo. 2. c. 17	15 May 1735
An Act to indemnify Persons who have omitted to qualify themselves for Offices and Employments within the Time limited by Law; and for allowing further Time for that Purpose. (Repealed by Statute Law Revision Act 1867 (30 & 31 Vict. c. 59))
Continuance of Laws Act 1734 (repealed)	8 Geo. 2. c. 18	15 May 1735
An Act to continue some Laws therein mentioned, relating to the Encouragement of the making of Sail Cloth in Great Britain; and for Encouragement of the Silk Manufactures of this Kingdom. (Repealed by Statute Law Revision Act 1867 (30 & 31 Vict. c. 59))
Colonial Trade Act 1734 (repealed)	8 Geo. 2. c. 19	15 May 1735
An Act to continue an Act passed in the Third Year of His present Majesty's Reign, intituled, "An Act for granting Liberty to carry Rice, from His Majesty's Province of Carolina in America, directly to any Part of Europe Southward of Cape Finisterre, in Ships built in and belonging to Great Britain, and navigated according to Law;" (Note: Colonial Trade Act 1729 (3 Geo. 2. c. 28)) and to extend that Liberty to His Majesty's Province of Georgia, in America. (Repealed by Statute Law Revision Act 1867 (30 & 31 Vict. c. 59))
Destruction of Turnpikes, etc. Act 1734 (repealed)	8 Geo. 2. c. 20	15 May 1735
An Act for rendering the Laws more effectual, for punishing such Persons as shall wilfully and maliciously pull down or destroy Turnpikes for repairing Highways, or Locks or other Works erected by Act of Parliament for making Rivers navigable; and for other Purposes therein mentioned. (Repealed for England and Wales by Criminal Statutes Repeal Act 1827 (7 & 8 Geo. 4. c. 27) and for India by Criminal Law (India) Act 1828 (9 Geo. 4. c. 74))
Continuance of Laws (No. 2) Act 1734 (repealed)	8 Geo. 2. c. 21	15 May 1735
An Act to continue several Laws therein mentioned, for the better Regulation and Government of Seamen in the Merchants Service; for the regulating of Pilots of Dover, Deal, and the Isle of Thanet; for preventing Frauds in the Customs, and to prevent the clandestine Running of Goods; and for making Copper Ore, of the British Plantations, an enumerated Commodity. (Repealed by Statute Law Revision Act 1867 (30 & 31 Vict. c. 59))
Late Earl of Seaforth Act 1734 (repealed)	8 Geo. 2. c. 22	15 May 1735
An Act to enable William Mackenzie late Earl of Seafort to sue or maintain any Action or Suit, notwithstanding his Attainder; and to remove any Disability in him, by reason of his said Attainder, to take or inherit any Real or Personal Estate that may or shall hereafter descend or come to him. (Repealed by Statute Law (Repeals) Act 1977 (c. 18))
Land Tax Act 1734 (repealed)	8 Geo. 2. c. 23	15 May 1735
An Act for granting an Aid to His Majesty, by a Land Tax, to be raised in Great Britain, for the Service of the Year One Thousand Seven Hundred and Thirty-five. (Repealed by Statute Law Revision Act 1867 (30 & 31 Vict. c. 59))
Set-off Act 1734 (repealed)	8 Geo. 2. c. 24	15 May 1735
An Act to explain and amend an Act passed in the Second Year of the Reign of His Present Majesty, intituled, "An Act for the Relief of Debtors, with respect to the Imprisonment of their Persons." (Note: Insolvent Debtors Relief (No. 2) Act 1728 (2 Geo. 2. c. 22)) (Repealed by Statute Law Revision and Civil Procedure Act 1883 (46 & 47 Vict. c. 49))
Papists Act 1734 (repealed)	8 Geo. 2. c. 25	15 May 1735
An Act to indemnify Protestant Purchasers of Estates of Papists against the Penalties or Forfeitures Papists are liable to, for not having enroled their Estates, in Pursuance of an Act of the Third Year of King George the First (Note: Papists Act 1716 (3 Geo. 1. c. 18)) for that Purpose. (Repealed by Statute Law Revision Act 1867 (30 & 31 Vict. c. 59))
Lincoln's Inn Fields Rate Act 1734	8 Geo. 2. c. 26	15 May 1735
An Act to enable the present and future Proprietors and Inhabitants of the Houses in Lincoln's Inn Fields, in the County of Middlesex, to make a Rate on themselves, for raising Money sufficient to enclose, clean, and adorn, the said Fields.
Church of Saint Leonard, Shoreditch Act 1734	8 Geo. 2. c. 27	15 May 1735
An Act for re-building the Parish Church of St. Leonard, Shoreditch, in the County of Middlesex.
Highgate and Hampstead Roads Act 1734 (repealed)	8 Geo. 2. c. 28	15 May 1735
An Act to explain and make more effectual the several Acts made and passed for repairing the Highways leading to Highgate Gatehouse and Hampstead, in the County of Middlesex, so far as the same relate to the Statute-work to be done upon the said Highways, or Compositions to be made in Lieu of the same. (Repealed by Highgate and Hampstead Roads Act 1776 (16 Geo. 3. c. 76) and Roads to Highgate House and Hampstead Act 1821 (1 & 2 Geo. 4. c. cx))
Forfeited Estates (Greenwich Hospital) Act 1734 (repealed)	8 Geo. 2. c. 29	15 May 1735
An Act for the Application of the Rents and Profits of the Estates forfeited by the Attainders of James late Earl of Derwentwater and Charles Radcliffe. (Repealed by Statute Law Revision Act 1948 (11 & 12 Geo. 6. c. 62))
Parliamentary Elections Act 1734 (repealed)	8 Geo. 2. c. 30	15 May 1735
An Act for regulating the Quartering of Soldiers, during the Time of the Elections of Members to serve in Parliament. (Repealed by Parliamentary Elections (Soldiers) Act 1847 (10 & 11 Vict. c. 21))

=== Private acts ===
Short title	Citation	Royal assent
Long title
Naturalization of Samuel Engel, John Peter Blaquiere and others.	8 Geo. 2. c. 1 Pr.	28 February 1735
An Act to naturalize Samuel Engel, John Peter Blaquiere, and others.
Younger Sons of the Duke of Rutland's Names Act 1734	8 Geo. 2. c. 2 Pr.	24 March 1735
An Act for enabling the Two Younger Sons of John Duke of Rutland, by Bridget late Dutchess of Rutland, and their respective Children, Progeny, and Issue, to take and use the Surname of Sutton, pursuant to the Will of Robert Lord Lexington, deceased, and in such Manner as is therein mentioned.
John Child, Lord Castlemain: enabling him, his heirs and any others in possession of certain estates settled by Frederick Tylney to take the name Tylney.	8 Geo. 2. c. 3 Pr.	24 March 1735
An Act to enable John Childe Esquire, commonly called Lord Castlemain, and the Heirs of his Body, and such other Persons who, by virtue of a Settlement made by Frederick Tylney Esquire, deceased, shall be in Possession of the Estates therein limited, to take and use the Surname of Tylney.
Exchange of lands between the Earl of Peterborough and Queen's College, Oxford.	8 Geo. 2. c. 4 Pr.	15 May 1735
An Act for exchanging Lands, between the Earl of Peterborow, and the Provost and Scholars of Queen's College in Oxford.
Lord Charleton's Estate Act 1734	8 Geo. 2. c. 5 Pr.	15 May 1735
An Act for Sale of the Estate of Henry late Lord Carleton, in the County of Oxon; and for laying out the Money arising by such Sale in the Purchase of another Estate, in or near the County of Wilts, to be settled to the like Uses.
Lord Polwarth's Estate Act 1734	8 Geo. 2. c. 6 Pr.	15 May 1735
An Act to enable Hugh Hume Campbell, commonly called Lord Polwarth, to sell Lands in Essex, settled by his Marriage Articles; and, with the Money arising thereby, to purchase other Lands, of like Value, to be settled to the same Uses.
Gilmour's Estate Act 1734	8 Geo. 2. c. 7 Pr.	15 May 1735
An Act to enable Sir Charles Gilmour Baronet to sell Part of the Lands and Baronies of Craigmillar and Nether Libberton, for Payment of Debts with which the said Estate stands charged and encumbered.
Dyke's Estates Act 1734	8 Geo. 2. c. 8 Pr.	15 May 1735
An Act for vesting an undivided Moiety of divers Lands and Hereditaments, in the Counties of Oxon and Kent, the Estate of Elizabeth Dyke, an Infant, in Edward Dyke Esquire and his Heirs, in Exchange for his undivided Moiety of divers Lands and Hereditaments in the Counties of Somerset and Devon.
Appleton's Estate Act 1734	8 Geo. 2. c. 9 Pr.	15 May 1735
An Act for confirming and establishing a Partition of the Estate of Henry Appleton, Esquire deceased, made pursuant to a Decree of the Court of Chancery.
Better execution of Richard Cantillon's will, and other provisions.	8 Geo. 2. c. 10 Pr.	15 May 1735
An Act for the better Execution of the last Will and Testament of Richard Cantillon Esquire, deceased; and for other Purposes therein mentioned.
Estates of William Forrester and Brooke Forrester (his son): settlement of estates in Salop. pursuant to an agreement prior to the marriage of Brooke Forrester, notwithstanding his minority.	8 Geo. 2. c. 11 Pr.	15 May 1735
An Act for vesting the Estates of William Forester Esquire and Brook Forester his Son and Heir Apparent, in the County of Salop, in Trustees, to settle the same, pursuant to an Agreement previous to the Marriage of the said Brook Forester with Elizabeth his Wife, notwithstanding the Minority of the said Brook Forester.
Edger's Estate Act 1734	8 Geo. 2. c. 12 Pr.	15 May 1735
An Act for discharging Part of the Estate of Robert Edgar Esquire, in the County of Cambridge, from the Uses of his Marriage Settlement; he having settled an Estate in the County of Suffolk, of greater Value, to the same Uses.
Tregeare's Estate Act 1734	8 Geo. 2. c. 13 Pr.	15 May 1735
An Act for vesting Part of the Real Estate late of James Tregeare Esquire, deceased, in Margery his Widow and Relict, in Part of her Dower; and for Sale of the rest of the said Estate, for Payment of the Debts of the said James Tregeare; and for laying out the Surplus Money arising by such Sale in the Purchase of other Lands, to the Use of Honour his Daughter and her Heirs.
Hunningham Inclosure Act 1734	8 Geo. 2. c. 14 Pr.	15 May 1735
An Act for enclosing the Common Fields, Common Meadows, and other Commonable Lands, in the Parish of Hunningham, in the County of Warwick.
Cheddleton Inclosure Act 1734	8 Geo. 2. c. 15 Pr.	15 May 1735
An Act for appointing Commissioners, to make a Division of certain Commons and Waste Lands, lying within the Manor and Parish of Chedleton, in the County of Stafford, among the Proprietors, in order to enclose the same.
Toller's Name Act 1734	8 Geo. 2. c. 16 Pr.	15 May 1735
An Act to enable William Toller, now called William Toller Treffry, Gentleman, and his Issue Male, to take and use the Surname of Treffry only, pursuant to the Deed of Settlement of John Treffry Esquire, deceased.
Explaining and amending an Act concerning the relief of Hannah MacDonnell.	8 Geo. 2. c. 17 Pr.	15 May 1735
An Act to explain and amend an Act made in the First Year of the Reign of Her late Majesty Queen Anne, intituled, "An Act for the Relief of Hannah McDonnel, with relation to the forfeited Estates in Ireland;" (Note: 1 Ann. c. 20 Pr.) and for enabling Randal McDonnel Esquire to sell or encumber the Estate therein mentioned.
Naturalization of Anna Elizabeth Broughton, Josias Cotton, John Chevalier and John Treber.	8 Geo. 2. c. 18 Pr.	15 May 1735
An Act for naturalizing Anna Elizabeth Broughton, Josias Cottin, John Chevalier, and John Treber.
Naturalization of Stephen Rosenhagen and Jane du Bouchet.	8 Geo. 2. c. 19 Pr.	15 May 1735
An Act to naturalize Stephen Mathew, Arnold Rosenhagen, and Jane Elizabeth du Bouchet.

=== Sources ===
- Pickering, Danby, ed. (1765). "Anno octavo Georgii II". The Statutes at Large. Vol. 16: From the Second to the 9th Year of King George II. Cambridge: Joseph Bentham. pp. 488–550 – via Internet Archive.
- Pickering, Danby, ed. (1765). "Anno octavo Georgii II". The Statutes at Large. Vol. 16: From the Second to the 9th Year of King George II. Cambridge: Joseph Bentham. pp. 488–550 – via Google Books.
- Journals of the House of Commons. Vol. 22. London: His Majesty's Stationery Office. 1803. pp. 323–495 – via Google Books.
- Chronological Table of and Index to the Statutes. Vol. 1: To the End of the Session 59 Vict. Sess. 2 (1895) (13th ed.). London: Her Majesty's Stationery Office. 1896. p. 103 – via Google Books.

== See also ==
- List of acts of the Parliament of Great Britain
