= Papists Act 1734 =

Act of the Parliament of Great Britain

- Act of Parliament
- Parliament of Great Britain
- Long title: An act to indemnify protestant purchasers of estates of papists, against the penalties or forfeitures papists are liable to for not having enrolled their estates, in pursuance of an act of the third year of king George the first for that purpose.
- Citation: 8 Geo. 2. c. 25
- Territorial extent: Great Britain

Dates
- Royal assent: 15 May 1735
- Commencement: 14 January 1735 (Note: Start of session.)
- Repealed: 15 July 1867
Other legislation
Repealed by	Statute Law Revision Act 1867
Relates to	Papists Act 1716

Status: Repealed

Text of statute as originally enacted

The Papists Act 1734 (8 Geo. 2. c. 25) was an act of the Parliament of Great Britain, passed during the reign of George II. Its long title was "An act to indemnify protestant purchasers of estates of papists, against the penalties or forfeitures papists are liable to for not having enrolled their estates, in pursuance of an act of the third year of king George the first for that purpose".

== Subsequent developments ==
The whole act was repealed by section 1 of, and the schedule to, the Statute Law Revision Act 1867 (30 & 31 Vict. c. 59), which came into force on 15 July 1867.
