= Roman Catholic Relief Act 1791 =

Act of the Parliament of Great Britain

Roman Catholic Relief Act 1791 (Note: The citation of this act by this short title was authorised by section 1 of, and the first schedule to, the Short Titles Act 1896. Due to the repeal of those provisions it is now authorised by section 19(2) of the Interpretation Act 1978.)
- Act of Parliament
- Parliament of Great Britain
- Long title: An act to relieve, upon conditions, and under restrictions, the persons therein described, from certain penalties and disabilities to which papists, or persons professing the popish religion, are by law subject
- Citation: 31 Geo. 3. c. 32
- Introduced by: William Pitt the Younger (Commons)
- Territorial extent: England and Wales (Note: Section 23.)

Dates
- Royal assent: 10 June 1791
- Commencement: 25 June 1791 (Note: Section 1.)
- Repealed: 31 July 1978
Other legislation
Repeals/revokes	Papists Act 1715; Papists Act 1716
Amended by	Religious Disabilities Act 1846; Universities Tests Act 1871; Promissory Oaths Act 1871; Statute Law Revision Act 1871; Statute Law Revision Act 1888; Roman Catholic Relief Act 1926; Ecclesiastical Jurisdiction Measure 1963; Criminal Justice Act 1972; Statute Law (Repeals) Act 1977
Repealed by	Statute Law (Repeals) Act 1978
Relates to	Act of Settlement 1701; Roman Catholic Relief Act 1793; Roman Catholic Relief Act 1829; Roman Catholics Act 1844; Places of Worship Registration Act 1855

Status: Repealed

Text of statute as originally enacted

The Roman Catholic Relief Act 1791 (31 Geo. 3. c. 32) was an act of the Parliament of Great Britain passed in 1791 which partially reduced discrimination against Roman Catholics and permitted them to more fully participate in public life, as part of the process of Catholic emancipation in Great Britain. It permitted Catholics to practise law, practise their religion, and establish Catholic schools, with significant restrictions.

Chapels, schools, officiating priests and teachers had to be registered, and children of Protestants were not permitted to attend. Catholics were not permitted to hold assemblies with locked doors, and chapels could not have steeples or bells. Priests were not permitted to wear vestments or celebrate liturgies in the open air. Monastic orders and endowments of schools and colleges were prohibited.

Political sentiment for reform was helped along by the signing of the Edict of Versailles in France in 1787, which gave non-Catholic French subjects full legal status in a kingdom where Catholicism had always been the state religion.

== Provisions ==
The act was significantly greater in scope than its predecessor, the Papists Act 1778 (18 Geo. 3. c. 60). Once again, it required an oath, this time including a promise to support the Protestant Succession under the Act of Settlement 1701 (12 & 13 Will. 3. c. 2). Catholics who took the oath were protected from prosecution for their faith.

The act also lifted a number of other restrictions on Catholics. Catholics were no longer required to take the Oath of Supremacy in order to live in London. The legislation of King George I, requiring them to register their estates and wills, was repealed, and the professions of counsellor and barrister at law, attorney, solicitor, and notary were opened to them.

However, the act required that Catholic assemblies should be certified at quarter sessions, with officiants recorded by the clerk of the peace. Buildings hosting such assemblies could not be locked, or have a steeple or bell.

Despite the progress for Catholics, many English statesmen felt that full emancipation was required. William Pitt the Younger and his rival, Charles James Fox, both agreed, but they were both thwarted by King George III, who insisted that any such measure would be a violation of his coronation oath.

Within Catholicism, there was significant dissent about the oath which was required of anyone who wished to benefit from the act, which was also required by the Papists Act 1778 (18 Geo. 3. c. 60). The lay members of the Catholic committee who had written the oath were accused by the Vicars Apostolic, who then administered the Catholic Church in England, of involving themselves in matters of ecclesiastical discipline. Although the bishops won the debate about the oath, the debate resulted in the formation in 1792 of the Cisalpine Club, whose members pledged "to resist any ecclesiastical interference which may militate against the freedom of English Catholics".

== The Irish Roman Catholic Relief Act 1793 ==
The act was followed by the Roman Catholic Relief Act 1793 (33 Geo. 3. c. 21 (I)), an act of the Irish Parliament in 1793, with some local provisions such as allowing Catholics to vote in elections to the Irish House of Commons and to take degrees at Trinity College Dublin. Catholic schools had already been permitted again by the Irish Catholic Relief Act 1782, subject to the teachers taking the Oath of Allegiance and obtaining a licence from the local Church of Ireland (Protestant) Bishop.

== Subsequent developments ==
So much of section 14 of the act as "relates to any of the universities of Oxford, Cambridge, and Durham, was repealed by section 8 of, and the schedule to, the Universities Tests Act 1871 (34 & 35 Vict. c. 26), which came into force on 16 June 1871.

Sections 1–4, 9, 18–22 and "so much of the rest of the act as relates to the taking and subscribing any oath" was repealed by section 1 of, and part II of schedule one to, the Promissory Oaths Act 1871 (34 & 35 Vict. c. 48), which came into force on 13 July 1871.

Section 10 of the act was repealed by section 1 of, and the schedule to, the Statute Law Revision Act 1871 (34 & 35 Vict. c. 116), which came into force on 21 August 1871.

In section 8 of the act, the words "from serving upon any jury or" were repealed by section 64(2) of, and part I of schedule 6 to, the Criminal Justice Act 1972, which came into force on 30 March 1974.

Sections 5 and 6 of the act were repealed by section 1(1) of, and part V of schedule 1 to, the Statute Law (Repeals) Act 1977, which came into force on 16 June 1977.

The whole act was repealed by section 1(1) of, and part XVI of schedule 1 to, the Statute Law (Repeals) Act 1978, which came into force on 31 July 1978.

== See also ==
- Catholic emancipation
- Toleration Act 1688
- Papists Act 1778
- Roman Catholic Relief Act 1829
- Places of Worship Registration Act 1855

== Bibliography ==
- Overton, J. H.; Relton, F. (1906). The English Church (1714–1800). London. pp. 226–227.
