= List of acts of the Parliament of Great Britain from 1716 =

This is a complete list of acts of the Parliament of Great Britain for the year 1716.

For acts passed until 1707, see the list of acts of the Parliament of England and the list of acts of the Parliament of Scotland. See also the list of acts of the Parliament of Ireland.

For acts passed from 1801 onwards, see the list of acts of the Parliament of the United Kingdom. For acts of the devolved parliaments and assemblies in the United Kingdom, see the list of acts of the Scottish Parliament, the list of acts of the Northern Ireland Assembly, and the list of acts and measures of Senedd Cymru; see also the list of acts of the Parliament of Northern Ireland.

The number shown after each act's title is its chapter number. Acts are cited using this number, preceded by the year(s) of the reign during which the relevant parliamentary session was held; thus the Union with Ireland Act 1800 is cited as "39 & 40 Geo. 3. c. 67", meaning the 67th act passed during the session that started in the 39th year of the reign of George III and which finished in the 40th year of that reign. Note that the modern convention is to use Arabic numerals in citations (thus "41 Geo. 3" rather than "41 Geo. III"). Acts of the last session of the Parliament of Great Britain and the first session of the Parliament of the United Kingdom are both cited as "41 Geo. 3".

Acts passed by the Parliament of Great Britain did not have a short title; however, some of these acts have subsequently been given a short title by acts of the Parliament of the United Kingdom (such as the Short Titles Act 1896).

Before the Acts of Parliament (Commencement) Act 1793 came into force on 8 April 1793, acts passed by the Parliament of Great Britain were deemed to have come into effect on the first day of the session in which they were passed. Because of this, the years given in the list below may in fact be the year before a particular act was passed.

== 3 Geo. 1 ==
The second session of the 5th Parliament of Great Britain, which met from 20 February 1717 until 15 July 1717.

This session was also traditionally cited as 3 G. 1.

=== Public acts ===
Short title	Citation	Royal assent
Long title
Commerce with Sweden Act 1716 (repealed)	3 Geo. 1. c. 1	28 February 1717
An act to enable his Majesty effectually to prohibit or restrain commerce with Sweden. (Repealed by Statute Law Revision Act 1867 (30 & 31 Vict. c. 59))
Mutiny Act 1716 (repealed)	3 Geo. 1. c. 2	25 March 1717
An act for punishing mutiny and desertion, and for the better payment of the army and their quarters. (Repealed by Statute Law Revision Act 1867 (30 & 31 Vict. c. 59))
Land Tax Act 1716 (repealed)	3 Geo. 1. c. 3	10 April 1717
An act for granting an aid to his Majesty by a land-tax in Great-Britain, for the service of the year one thousand seven hundred and seventeen. (Repealed by Statute Law Revision Act 1867 (30 & 31 Vict. c. 59))
Taxation Act 1716 (repealed)	3 Geo. 1. c. 4	22 June 1717
An act for continuing the duties on malt, mum, cyder, and perry, for the service of the year one thousand seven hundred and seventeen; and to authorize allowances to he made to certain receivers; and to obviate a doubt concerning goods imported from the islands of Jersey, Guernsey, Sark, and Alderney; and to ascertain the duties upon sheep skins and lamb skins; and to prevent frauds in the duties upon starch; and for making forth duplicates of Exchequer-bills, lottery tickets, and orders, loft, burnt or destroyed, and for enlarging the time for adjusting claims in several lotteries; and for preventing frauds in the duties on low wines and spirits carried coastwise. (Repealed by Statute Law Revision Act 1867 (30 & 31 Vict. c. 59))
Edinburgh Beer Duties Act 1716 (repealed)	3 Geo. 1. c. 5	22 June 1717
An act for continuing the duty of two pennies Scots, or one sixth part of a penny sterling, on every pint of ale and beer that shall he vended or sold within the city of Edinburgh and privileges thereof, for the benefit of the said city, and for discontinuing the payment of the dues commonly called the petty-port customs at Edinburgh, during the continuance of this act. (Repealed by Statute Law Revision Act 1948 (11 & 12 Geo. 6. c. 62))
Dumfries Beer Duties Act 1716 (repealed)	3 Geo. 1. c. 6	22 June 1717
An act for laying a duty of two pennies Scots, or one sixth part of a penny sterling, upon every pint of ale or beer that shall be vended or sold within the town of Dumfries, and privileges thereof, for paying the debts of the said town, and for building a church, and making a harbour there. (Repealed by Statute Law Revision Act 1948 (11 & 12 Geo. 6. c. 62))
National Debt Act 1716 (repealed)	3 Geo. 1. c. 7	15 July 1717
An Act for redeeming the Yearly Fund of the South Sea Company (being after the Rate of Six Pounds per Centum per Annum); and settling on the said Company a Yearly Fund, after the Rate of Five Pounds per Centum per Annum, redeemable by Parliament; and to raise, for an Annuity or Annuities at Five Pounds per Centum per Annum, any Sum not exceeding Two Millions, to be employed in lessening the National Debts and Incumbrances; and for making the said new Yearly Fund and Annuities to be hereafter redeemable, in the Time and Manner thereby prescribed. (Repealed by Statute Law Revision Act 1870 (33 & 34 Vict. c. 69))
Bank of England Act 1716 (repealed)	3 Geo. 1. c. 8	15 July 1717
An Act for redeeming several Funds of the Governor and Company of the Bank of England, pursuant to former Provisoes of Redemption; and for securing to them several new funds and allowances redeemable by parliament; and for obliging them to advance further sums not exceeding two millions five hundred thousand pounds, at five pounds per centum, as shall be found necessary to be employed in lessening the national debts and incumbrances; and for continuing certain provisions formerly made for the expences of his Majesty's civil government; and for payment of annuities formerly purchased at the rate of five pounds per centum; and for other Purposes in this Act mentioned. (Repealed by Statute Law (Repeals) Act 1995 (c. 44))
National Debt (No. 2) Act 1716 (repealed)	3 Geo. 1. c. 9	15 July 1717
An act for redeeming the duties and revenues which were settled to pay off principal and interest on the orders made forth on four lottery acts passed in the ninth (Note: Post Office (Revenues) Act 1710 (9 Ann. c. 11)) (Note: Taxation (No. 2) Act 1710 (9 Ann. c. 12)) (Note: Stamps (No. 2) Act 1710 (9 Ann. c. 16)) and tenth (Note: Taxation Act 1711 (10 Ann. c. 18)) years of her late Majesty's reign; and for redeeming certain annuities payable on orders out of the hereditary excise, according to a former act (Note: Appropriation of Revenue Act 1700 (12 & 13 Will. 3. c. 12)) in that behalf; and for establishing a general yearly fund, not only for the future payment of annuities at several rates to he payable and transferrable at the bank of England, and redeemable by parliament, but also to raise monies for such proprietors of the said orders as shall choose to be paid their principal and arrears of interest in ready money; and for making good such other deficiencies and payments as in this act are mentioned; and for taking off the duties on linseed imported, and British linen exported. (Repealed by Statute Law Revision Act 1870 (33 & 34 Vict. c. 69))
Queen Anne's Bounty Act 1716 (repealed)	3 Geo. 1. c. 10	15 July 1717
An act for the better collecting and levying the revenue of the tenths of the clergy. (Repealed by First Fruits and Tenths Measure 1926 (16 & 17 Geo. 5. No. 5))
Game Act 1716 (repealed)	3 Geo. 1. c. 11	15 July 1717
An act to explain and amend several laws therein mentioned, for the better preservation of the game. (Repealed by Gamekeepers Act 1808 (48 Geo. 3. c. 93))
Bankruptcy Act 1716 (repealed)	3 Geo. 1. c. 12	15 July 1717
An act to impower commissioners in commissions of bankrupts, issued since the four and twentieth day of June one thousand seven hundred and six, and on or before the six and twentieth day of June one thousand seven hundred and sixteen, to make certificates for bankrupts; and the lord chancellor, lord keeper, commissioners of the great seal, or two judges, to confirm the same, notwithstanding the acts of the fourth and fifth, (Note: Bankruptcy Act 1705 (4 & 5 Ann. c. 4)) and the fifth (Note: Bankrupts Act 1706 (6 Ann. c. 22)) of Queen Anne, are expired; and for continuing a clause in a former act for adjusting accounts between bankrupts and their debtors. (Repealed by Statute Law Revision Act 1867 (30 & 31 Vict. c. 59))
Pilotage Act 1716 (repealed)	3 Geo. 1. c. 13	15 July 1717
An act for the better regulating of pilots for conducing of ships and vessels from Dover, Deal and the isle of Thanet, up the rivers of Thames and Medway. (Repealed by Statute Law Revision Act 1867 (30 & 31 Vict. c. 59))
Equivalent Act 1716 (repealed)	3 Geo. 1. c. 14	15 July 1717
An act to continue an act of the first year of his Majesty's reign, intituled, "An act for taking and stating the debts due and growing due to Scotland by way of equivalent in the terms of the union; and for relief of the creditors of the publick and the commissioners of the equivalent." (Note: Equivalent Act 1714 (1 Geo. 1. St. 2. c. 27)) (Repealed by Statute Law Revision Act 1867 (30 & 31 Vict. c. 59))
Estreats Act 1716 (repealed)	3 Geo. 1. c. 15	15 July 1717
An act for the better regulating the office of sheriffs, and for ascertaining their fees, and the fees for suing out their patents, and passing their accounts. (Repealed by Fines Act 1833 (3 & 4 Will. 4. c. 99), Statute Law Revision Act 1867 (30 & 31 Vict. c. 59), Sheriffs Act 1887 (50 & 51 Vict. c. 55) and Statute Law Revision Act 1948 (11 & 12 Geo. 6. c. 62))
Sheriffs Act 1716 (repealed)	3 Geo. 1. c. 16	15 July 1717
An act for the better enabling sheriffs to sue out their patents and pass their accounts. (Repealed by Fines Act 1833 (3 & 4 Will. 4. c. 99))
Debts Due to the Army Act 1716 (repealed)	3 Geo. 1. c. 17	15 July 1717
An act to enable his Majesty to appoint commissioners to take, examine, state and determine the debts due to the army. (Repealed by Statute Law Revision Act 1867 (30 & 31 Vict. c. 59))
Papists Act 1716 (repealed)	3 Geo. 1. c. 18	15 July 1717
An act for explaining an act passed the last session of parliament, intituled, "An act to oblige papists to register their names and real estates; and for enlarging the time of such registring; and for securing purchases made by protestants." (Note: Papists Act 1715 (1 Geo. 1. St. 2. c. 55)) (Repealed by Roman Catholic Relief Act 1791 (31 Geo. 3. c. 32))
General Pardon Act 1716 or the Indemnity Act 1717 or the Act of Grace and Free Pardon (repealed)	3 Geo. 1. c. 19	15 July 1717
An act for the King's most gracious, general and free pardon. (Repealed by Statute Law Revision Act 1867 (30 & 31 Vict. c. 59))
Forfeited Estates (Time for Claims) Act 1716 (repealed)	3 Geo. 1. c. 20	15 July 1717
An act to enlarge the time for making claims before the commissioners appointed to enquire of the forfeited estates. (Repealed by Statute Law Revision Act 1948 (11 & 12 Geo. 6. c. 62))
Exportation, etc. Act 1716 (repealed)	3 Geo. 1. c. 21	15 July 1717
An act for continuing the liberty of exporting Irish linen cloth to the British plantations in America duty free; and, for the more effectual discovery of and prosecuting such as shall unlawfully export wool and woollen manufactures from Ireland; and for relief of John Fletcher in respect of the duty by him paid for a quantity of salt lost in the exportation for Ireland. (Repealed by Statute Law Revision Act 1867 (30 & 31 Vict. c. 59))

=== Private acts ===
Short title	Citation	Royal assent
Long title
Liverpool Docks Act 1716 (repealed)	3 Geo. 1. c. 1 Pr.	10 April 1717
An Act for enlarging the Time granted by an Act passed in the Eighth Year of the Reign of Her late Majesty Queen Anne, intituled, "An Act for making a convenient Dock, or Bason, at Liverpoole, for Security of all Ships trading to and from the said Port of Liverpoole." (Note: Liverpool Docks Act 1709 (8 Ann. c. 8)) (Repealed by Mersey Dock Acts Consolidation Act 1858 (21 & 22 Vict. c. xcii))
Microp's Naturalization Act 1716	3 Geo. 1. c. 2 Pr.	10 April 1717
An Act for naturalizing Isaac Kuyckan Microp.
Sunderland Harbour and River Wear Act 1716	3 Geo. 1. c. 3 Pr.	22 June 1717
An Act for the Preservation and Improvement of the River Wear, and Port and Haven of Sunderland, in the County of Durham.
Middlesex and Hertfordshire Roads Act 1716	3 Geo. 1. c. 4 Pr.	22 June 1717
An Act for repairing the Highways from several Places therein mentioned, leading towards Highgate Gatehouse and Hampstead, in the County of Midd'x; and for electing Trustees, for keeping up a sufficient Number, for the repairing the Highways upon the Roads from Highgate Gatehouse to Barnet Blockhouse; and also of the Highways between Kilburne Bridge and Sparrows Herne, in the County of Hertford.
St. Mary Rotherhithe Act 1716	3 Geo. 1. c. 5 Pr.	22 June 1717
An Act to enable the Parishioners of the Parish of St. Mary, Rotherhith, in the County of Surrey (by certain Funeral Rates therein mentioned), to finish the said Parish Church.
Estates of John, Duke of Rutland and his son John Manners, Marquis of Granby: settlement on marriage of the Marquis of Granby to Bridget Sutton, daughter of Lord Lexington and sale of estates of Lord Lexington and Bridget Sutton for her marriage portion.	3 Geo. 1. c. 6 Pr.	22 June 1717
An Act for settling the Estates of the most Noble John Duke of Rutland, and John Manners Esquire, commonly called Marquis of Granby, Son and Heir Apparent of the said Duke, on the Marriage of the said Marquis of Granby with the Honourable Bridget Sutton, only Child of the Right Honourable the Lord Lexington; and also for vesting the Estates of the said Robert Lord Lexington and Bridget Sutton, therein mentioned, in Trustees, to be sold, for raising Money for the Marriage Portion of the said Bridget Sutton.
Brownlowe Estate Act 1716	3 Geo. 1. c. 7 Pr.	22 June 1717
An Act for confirming a Partition lately made of the Estate of Sir John Brownlowe Baronet, deceased, in the Counties of Lincoln, York, Middlesex, and Hertford, remaining unsold, and Articles of Agreement relating thereunto; and also all the several Conveyances made of the divided Parts; and for making effectual a Fine and Recovery, intended to be levied and suffered, of a Fee Farm Rent of Twenty Pounds per Annum, Part of the Estate in the said County of Hertford.
Barrington's Name Act 1716	3 Geo. 1. c. 8 Pr.	22 June 1717
An Act to enable John Barrington, alias Shute, Esquire, and his Issue Male, to change their Surname to Barrington, according to the Settlement of Francis Barrington Esquire, deceased.
Enabling the Barons of the Exchequer in Ireland to grant a commission: to some of the Barons of the Exchequer in England to administer to Thomas Hopkins the oaths for the due execution of the office of Searcher, Packer and Gauger in the Port of Dublin, granted to him for his life.	3 Geo. 1. c. 9 Pr.	22 June 1717
An Act to empower the Barons of the Exchequer in Ireland to grant a Commission to some of the Barons of the Exchequer in England, to administer to Thomas Hopkins Esquire the Oaths for the due Execution of the Office or Offices of Searcher, Packer, and Gauger, in the Port of the City of Dublin, granted to him for his Life.
Enabling Susanna Catherina Nugent to sue for, recover and hold the portion of £1,400, provided for her out of her father's estate, notwithstanding her coverture (married state) and the outlawry of her husband, Hyacinthus Nugent.	3 Geo. 1. c. 10 Pr.	22 June 1717
An Act to enable Susanna Catherina Nugent to sue for, recover, and hold, the Portion of Fourteen Hundred Pounds, provided for her out of her Father's Estate, notwithstanding her Coverture, and the Outlawry of her Husband Hyacinthus Nugent Esquire.
Fulford's Estate Act 1716	3 Geo. 1. c. 11 Pr.	22 June 1717
An Act to enable Francis Fulford Esquire, and his First and other Sons, successively, to put in Execution the Power of granting Leases, given by the last Will and Testament of Francis Fulford Esquire, deceased.
Heath's Estate Act 1716	3 Geo. 1. c. 12 Pr.	22 June 1717
An Act for vesting an Estate late of Sir Thomas Heath Knight, deceased, in Trustees, to be sold, for Payment of his Debts, and other Uses.
Davis' Estate Act 1716	3 Geo. 1. c. 13 Pr.	22 June 1717
An Act for rectifying Defects in a Settlement, made by Robert Davies Esquire, deceased, of certain Estates in the Counties of Denbigh and Flint; and effectually securing the Payment of his Debts, and making Provisions for the Younger Children of Robert Davies his Son; and settling the said Estates subject thereto.
Kensington, Staines and Cranford Bridge Roads Act 1716	3 Geo. 1. c. 14 Pr.	15 July 1717
An Act for repairing the Highways, from that Part of Counter's Bridge which lies in the Parish of Kensington, in the County of Middlesex, to The Powder Mills in the Road to Staines, and Cranford Bridge, in the said County, in the Road to Colnebrook.
Explaining and making more effectual the Acts of the years 5 Ann. and 8 Ann. for amending Hockley and Stony-Stratford road.	3 Geo. 1. c. 15 Pr.	15 July 1717
An Act for explaining and making more effectual the Acts of the Fifth (Note: Bedfordshire and Buckinghamshire Roads Act 1706 (6 Ann. c. 4)) and Eighth (Note: Bedford and Buckinghamshire Highways Act 1709 (8 Ann. c. 25)) Years of Her late Majesty Queen Anne, for amending the Road between Hockley, in the County of Bedford, and Stoney Stratford, in the County of Bucks.
Duke of Montague's Estate Act 1716	3 Geo. 1. c. 16 Pr.	15 July 1717
An Act for the Sale of Part of the Duke of Montagu's Estate, for the Intents and Purposes therein mentioned; and for settling other Estates, in Lieu thereof, to the same Uses.
Enabling Richard, Earl of Scarborough to take in Great Britain the oath of office as Vice Treasurer and Receiver General and Paymaster General of His Majesty's revenues in Ireland and to qualify himself for the enjoyment of the said office.	3 Geo. 1. c. 17 Pr.	15 July 1717
An Act to enable Richard Earl of Scarbrough to take in Great Britain the Oath of Office, as Vice Treasurer and Receiver General and Paymaster General of all His Majesty's Revenues in the Kingdom of Ireland; and to qualify himself for the Enjoyment of the said Office.
Enabling His Majesty to make provision for the wives and children of James, late Earl of Southesque, James, late Lord Drummond, the late Sir Hugh Patterson of Bannockburn and James Sterling, late of Keir.	3 Geo. 1. c. 18 Pr.	15 July 1717
An Act to enable His Majesty to make Provision for the respective Wives and Children of James late Earl of Southeske, James late Lord Drummond, the late Sir Hugh Paterson of Bannockburn, and James Stirling late of Keir.
Enabling His Majesty to make such provision for, and settlement on, Margaret the wife of James, late Earl of Panmuir as she would have been entitled to if her husband were naturally dead.	3 Geo. 1. c. 19 Pr.	15 July 1717
An Act to enable His Majesty to make such Provision for, and Settlement upon, Margaret the Wife of James late Earl of Panmure, as she would have been entitled to in case her said Husband was naturally dead.
Enabling His Majesty to make provision for Lady Nairn and her children out of her paternal estate forfeited during the life of her husband William Murray, late Lord Nairn.	3 Geo. 1. c. 20 Pr.	15 July 1717
An Act to enable His Majesty to make Provision for Margaret Lady Nairn and her Children, out of her Paternal Estate, forfeited during the Life of William Murray late Lord Nairn, her Husband.
Raising and paying Lady Amelia Butler's portion out of lands in Ireland.	3 Geo. 1. c. 21 Pr.	15 July 1717
An Act for raising and paying the Lady Amelia Butler's Portion, out of Lands in Ireland.
Robert Dashwood's and Cholmley Turner's estates: confirmation of partition of manors, lands and hereditaments in Oxfordshire.	3 Geo. 1. c. 22 Pr.	15 July 1717
An Act for confirming a Partition made between Robert Dashwood Esquire and Cholmley Turner Esquire, of certain Manors, Lands, and Hereditaments, in the County of Oxon.
Confirmation of an agreement between John Wind, vicar of Thirkleby (Yorkshire) and Sir Thomas Frankland for exchange of the vicarage house and certain lands.	3 Geo. 1. c. 23 Pr.	15 July 1717
An Act for confirming an Agreement made between John Wind Clerk, Vicar of Thirkleby, in the County of York, and Sir Thomas Frankland Baronet, for Exchange of the Vicarage-house and certain Lands therein mentioned.
Middleton's Estate Act 1716	3 Geo. 1. c. 24 Pr.	15 July 1717
An Act for the Sale of the Estate of Thomas Middleton Esquire, deceased, for the more speedy raising of Maintenance-money and Portions for his Daughters; and for the other Purposes in the Bill mentioned.
Edward Rolt's and John Boteler's estates: exchange of woodland in Hertfordshire.	3 Geo. 1. c. 25 Pr.	15 July 1717
An Act to enable Edward Rolt Esquire to exchange a certain Parcel of Woodlands, in the County of Hertford, with John Boteler Esquire, for other Woodlands, of equal Value, in the said County; and for settling the same respectively as therein mentioned.
Vesting an estate in Corsham (Wiltshire) in the surviving trustee and executor of Henry Frederick Thynne and his heirs to be sold for the execution of the trusts created by his will.	3 Geo. 1. c. 26 Pr.	15 July 1717
An Act for vesting an Estate, at Corsham in Wiltshire, in the surviving Trustee and Executor of the last Will of Henry Frederick Thynne Esquire, deceased, and his Heirs, to make Sale thereof, for the Execution of the Trusts created by his Will.
Wollacombe's Estate Act 1716	3 Geo. 1. c. 27 Pr.	15 July 1717
An Act to enable Roger Stafford Esquire and his Issue Male to change their Surname to Wollocombe, according to the Will of Roger Wollocombe Esquire, deceased.
Stone's Estate Act 1716	3 Geo. 1. c. 28 Pr.	15 July 1717
An Act for Sale of the Estate of John Stone the Elder and John Stone the Younger, in the County of Sussex, for discharging the Incumbrances thereon, in respect of the Infancy of One of the Coheirs of John Stone the Younger; and for securing the Residue of the Money as therein is mentioned.
Newman's Estate Act 1716	3 Geo. 1. c. 29 Pr.	15 July 1717
An Act to enable William Newman Esquire to sell Part of the Estate included in his Marriage Settlement, for Payment of Debts; and to settle another Estate in Lieu thereof.
Richmond's Estate Act 1716	3 Geo. 1. c. 30 Pr.	15 July 1717
An Act for vesting in Trustees the Estate of Thomas Richmond Esquire, deceased, in the County of Essex, to be sold, for Payment of his Debts, Legacies, and Funeral Expences, according to the Will of the said Thomas Richmond.
Declaration of uses of two fines levied by John and Margaret Cuff to Joseph Kelly and his heirs and Maurice Cuff of certain lands and tithes in Counties Down and Cavan (Ireland).	3 Geo. 1. c. 31 Pr.	15 July 1717
An Act, declaring the Uses of Two several Fines, levied by John Cuffe Esquire and Margaret his Wife, to Joseph Kelly Esquire, deceased, and Maurice Cuffe Esquire, and the Heirs of the said Joseph Kelly, of certain Lands and Tithes, in the Counties of Down and Cavan, in the Kingdom of Ireland.
Wemys' Estate Act 1716	3 Geo. 1. c. 32 Pr.	15 July 1717
An Act to enable Patrick Wemys Esquire to sell certain Houses in Dublin, for Payment of Debts; and for the settling Lands in the County of Kilkenny, and elsewhere, to the same Uses to which the Houses to be sold were settled.
Naturalization of John Jacob Heldt, Theodore Van Rheden and others.	3 Geo. 1. c. 33 Pr.	15 July 1717
An Act to naturalize John Jacob Heldt, Theodore Van Rheden, and others.

=== Sources ===
- Pickering, Danby, ed. (1764). "Anno tertio Georgii I". The Statutes at Large. Vol. 13: From the Twelfth Year of Queen Anne to the Fifth Year of King George I. Cambridge: Joseph Bentham. pp. 323–458 – via Internet Archive.
- Pickering, Danby, ed. (1764). "Anno tertio Georgii I". The Statutes at Large. Vol. 13: From the Twelfth Year of Queen Anne to the Fifth Year of King George I. Cambridge: Joseph Bentham. pp. 323–458 – via Google Books.
- Pickering, Danby, ed. (1764). "Anno tertio Georgii I". The Statutes at Large. Vol. 13: From the Twelfth Year of Queen Anne to the Fifth Year of King George I. Cambridge: Joseph Bentham. pp. 323–458 – via Internet Archive.
- Pickering, Danby, ed. (1764). "Anno tertio Georgii I". The Statutes at Large. Vol. 13: From the Twelfth Year of Queen Anne to the Fifth Year of King George I. Cambridge: Joseph Bentham. pp. 323–458 – via Internet Archive.
- Journals of the House of Commons. Vol. 18. London: His Majesty's Stationery Office. 1803. pp. 473–626 – via Google Books.
- Chronological Table of and Index to the Statutes. Vol. 1: To the End of the Session 59 Vict. Sess. 2 (1895) (13th ed.). London: Her Majesty's Stationery Office. 1896. p. 93-94 – via Google Books.
- "Acts of the Parliament of Great Britain from 1716". legislation.gov.uk. The National Archives.

== See also ==
- List of acts of the Parliament of Great Britain
