= Papists Act 1715 =

Act of the Parliament of Great Britain

- Act of Parliament
- Parliament of Great Britain
- Long title: An Act to oblige Papists to register their Names and Real Estates.
- Citation: 1 Geo. 1. St. 2. c. 55
- Territorial extent: Great Britain

Dates
- Royal assent: 26 June 1716
- Commencement: 24 June 1716 (Note: Section 1.)
- Repealed: 25 June 1791
Other legislation
Amended by	Papists Act 1716
Repealed by	Roman Catholic Relief Act 1791

Status: Repealed

Text of statute as originally enacted

The Papists Act 1715 (1 Geo. 1. St. 2. c. 55) was an act of the Parliament of Great Britain. The act required Roman Catholics who did not take the oath of fidelity to register their property.

The act was passed in the aftermath of the Jacobite rising of 1715. The act's preamble claimed that the act was necessary because Catholics had plotted for "the destruction of this kingdom and the extirpation of the Protestant Religion" despite the "tender regard" the King had shown by not enforcing the many penal laws against them. It was further claimed that "all or the greatest part" of the Catholic population had been "stirring up and supporting the late unnatural Rebellion for the dethroning and murdering his most Sacred Majesty; for setting up a Popish Pretender upon the Throne of this kingdom; for the Destruction of the Protestant Religion and the cruel murdering and massacring of its Professors". Therefore, the act continued, Catholics are "enemies to His Majesty and to the present happy Establishment" who "watch for all opportunities of fomenting and stirring up new Rebellions and Disturbances within the Kingdom and of inviting Foreigners to invade it".

The act ensured that justices of the peace tendered the oaths of allegiance, supremacy and abjuration to all confirmed and suspected Catholics. If any Catholic had not taken the oaths by the deadline they were required to sign a register that included information about their estates. This was intended to facilitate a discriminatory tax on Catholics because, the act claimed, they should pay any "large share to all such Extraordinary Expenses as are and shall be brought upon this Kingdom by their Treachery and Instigation". The annual rent of the estates registered totalled £400,000.

== Subsequent developments ==
The act was amended by the Papists Act 1716 (3 Geo. 1. c. 18), passed in the subsequent session of parliament.

The whole act was repealed by section 21 of the Roman Catholic Relief Act 1791 (31 Geo. 3. c. 32)
