= Papists Act 1716 =

Act of the Parliament of Great Britain

- Act of Parliament
- Parliament of Great Britain
- Long title: An act for explaining an act passed the last session of parliament, intituled, "An act to oblige papists to register their names and real estates; and for enlarging the time of such registring; and for securing purchases made by protestants."
- Citation: 3 Geo. 1. c. 18
- Territorial extent: Great Britain

Dates
- Royal assent: 15 July 1717
- Commencement: 20 February 1717 (Note: Start of session.)
- Repealed: 25 June 1791
Other legislation
Amends	Papists Act 1715
Repealed by	Roman Catholic Relief Act 1791
Relates to	Papists Act 1723; Papists Act 1732; Papists Act 1734; Papists Act 1740

Status: Repealed

Text of statute as originally enacted

The Papists Act 1716 (3 Geo. 1. c. 18) was an act of the Parliament of Great Britain. The act enabled two justices of the peace to tender the oaths of allegiance and supremacy and the oath of abjuration of the Pretender to any Roman Catholic who they felt was disaffected. Their refusal to take the oath would make them liable to the punishments of recusancy. Also, Catholic landowners were required to register their estates with all future conveyances and wills.

== Subsequent developments ==
The whole act was repealed by section 21 of the Roman Catholic Relief Act 1791 (31 Geo. 3. c. 32).
