= List of acts of the Parliament of Great Britain from 1715 =

This is a complete list of acts of the Parliament of Great Britain for the year 1715.

For acts passed until 1707, see the list of acts of the Parliament of England and the list of acts of the Parliament of Scotland. See also the list of acts of the Parliament of Ireland.

For acts passed from 1801 onwards, see the list of acts of the Parliament of the United Kingdom. For acts of the devolved parliaments and assemblies in the United Kingdom, see the list of acts of the Scottish Parliament, the list of acts of the Northern Ireland Assembly, and the list of acts and measures of Senedd Cymru; see also the list of acts of the Parliament of Northern Ireland.

The number shown after each act's title is its chapter number. Acts are cited using this number, preceded by the year(s) of the reign during which the relevant parliamentary session was held; thus the Union with Ireland Act 1800 is cited as "39 & 40 Geo. 3. c. 67", meaning the 67th act passed during the session that started in the 39th year of the reign of George III and which finished in the 40th year of that reign. Note that the modern convention is to use Arabic numerals in citations (thus "41 Geo. 3" rather than "41 Geo. III"). Acts of the last session of the Parliament of Great Britain and the first session of the Parliament of the United Kingdom are both cited as "41 Geo. 3".

Acts passed by the Parliament of Great Britain did not have a short title; however, some of these acts have subsequently been given a short title by acts of the Parliament of the United Kingdom (such as the Short Titles Act 1896).

Before the Acts of Parliament (Commencement) Act 1793 came into force on 8 April 1793, acts passed by the Parliament of Great Britain were deemed to have come into effect on the first day of the session in which they were passed. Because of this, the years given in the list below may in fact be the year before a particular act was passed.

== 1 Geo. 1. St. 2 ==
Continuing the first session of the 5th Parliament of Great Britain, which met from 17 March 1715 until 26 June 1716.

This session was also traditionally cited as 1 Geo. 1. Stat. 2, 1 Geo. 1. st. 2, 1 G. 1. Stat. 2, 1 G. 1. St. 2 or 1 G. 1. st. 2.

=== Public acts ===
Short title	Citation	Royal assent
Long title
Habeas Corpus Suspension Act 1715 (repealed)	1 Geo. 1. St. 2. c. 30	21 January 1716
An Act for continuing an Act of this present Session of Parliament, intituled, "An Act to empower His Majesty to secure and detain such Persons as His Majesty shall suspect are conspiring against His Person and Government." (Note: Habeas Corpus Suspension, etc. Act 1714 (1 Geo. 1. St. 2. c. 8)) (Repealed by Statute Law Revision Act 1867 (30 & 31 Vict. c. 59))
Land Tax Act 1715 (repealed)	1 Geo. 1. St. 2. c. 31	17 February 1716
An Act for granting an Aid to His Majesty, by a Land Tax in Great Britain, for the Service of the Year One Thousand Seven Hundred and Sixteen. (Repealed by Statute Law Revision Act 1867 (30 & 31 Vict. c. 59))
Attainder of Earl of Mar and others Act 1715 (repealed)	1 Geo. 1. St. 2. c. 32	17 February 1716
An Act to attaint John Earl of Mar, William Murray Esquire commonly called Marquis of Tullibardine, James Earl of Linlithgow, and William Drummond Esquire commonly called Lord Drummond, of High Treason. (Repealed by Statute Law (Repeals) Act 1977 (c. 18))
Trial of Rebels Act 1715 or the Treason Act 1714 (repealed)	1 Geo. 1. St. 2. c. 33	6 March 1716
An Act for the more easy and speedy Trial of such Persons as have levied, or shall levy, War against His Majesty. (Repealed by Statute Law Revision Act 1867 (30 & 31 Vict. c. 59))
Mutiny Act 1715 (repealed)	1 Geo. 1. St. 2. c. 34	23 March 1716
An Act for preventing Mutiny and Desertion; and for the better Payment of the Army and their Quarters. (Repealed by Statute Law Revision Act 1867 (30 & 31 Vict. c. 59))
Debts Due to the Army Act 1715 (repealed)	1 Geo. 1. St. 2. c. 35	23 March 1716
An Act for appointing a Commissioner, for taking, examining, and stating, the Debts due to the Army, in the room of Thomas Smith Esquire, deceased; and for continuing the former Act until the Tenth Day of March One Thousand Seven Hundred and Sixteen. (Repealed by Statute Law Revision Act 1867 (30 & 31 Vict. c. 59))
Taxation, etc. Act 1715 (repealed)	1 Geo. 1. St. 2. c. 36	7 May 1716
An Act for charging and continuing the Duties on Malt, Mum, Cyder, and Perry, for the Service of the Year One Thousand Seven Hundred and Sixteen; and for compelling several Receivers to finish and clear their Accompts; and for making Duplicates of Exchequer Bills, Lottery Tickets, and Orders, lost, burnt, or destroyed; and for enlarging the Time for adjusting Claims to certain Benefit Tickets; and for allowing the Charge of executing the Lottery Act for the Service of the Year One Thousand Seven Hundred and Ten; and for recovering Monies of several Land Taxes, resting in the Hands of Collectors or Constables at St. Albans; and for preventing Frauds in the Duties upon Soap; and for limiting a Time for Persons who have certain Annuities for Life or Lives to demand the Payment thereupon at the Exchequer; and for preventing Frauds in the Duties relating to printed and painted Paper, Callicoes, and other Things therein mentioned. (Repealed by Statute Law Revision Act 1867 (30 & 31 Vict. c. 59))
Duchy of Cornwall Act 1715 (repealed)	1 Geo. 1. St. 2. c. 37	7 May 1716
An Act to enable His Majesty to grant the Regalities and Lands now remaining in the Crown, in North Wales and South Wales, and County of Chester, to his Royal Highness the Prince of Wales, in such Manner and Form as the Principality of Wales and Earldom of Chester have formerly been granted to the Princes of Wales; and also to enable his said Royal Highness to make Leases of Lands, Parcel of his Royal Highness's Dutchy of Cornwal, or annexed to the same. (Repealed by Statute Law Revision Act 1948 (11 & 12 Geo. 6. c. 62))
Septennial Act 1715 (repealed)	1 Geo. 1. St. 2. c. 38	7 May 1716
An Act for enlarging the Time of Continuance of Parliaments, appointed by an Act made in the Sixth Year of the Reign of King William and Queen Mary, intituled, "An Act for the frequent meeting and calling of Parliaments." (Note: Meeting of Parliament Act 1694 (6 & 7 Will. & Mar. c. 2)) (Repealed by Fixed-term Parliaments Act 2011 (c. 14))
Indemnity Act 1715 (repealed)	1 Geo. 1. St. 2. c. 39	7 May 1716
An Act to indemnify such Persons who have acted in Defence of His Majesty's Person and Government, and for the Preservation of the Public Peace of this Kingdom, in and about the Time of the late unnatural Rebellion, from vexatious Suits and Prosecutions. (Repealed by Statute Law Revision Act 1867 (30 & 31 Vict. c. 59))
Importation Act 1715 (repealed)	1 Geo. 1. St. 2. c. 40	7 May 1716
An Act for the free Importation of Cochineal, during the Time therein limited. (Repealed by Statute Law Revision Act 1867 (30 & 31 Vict. c. 59))
Woollen Manufacture Act 1715 (repealed)	1 Geo. 1. St. 2. c. 41	7 May 1716
An Act for giving Liberty to Persons who have served their Apprenticeships to any Part of the Woollen Manufacture in Colchester to work at their said Trades, and at the making Baize, within the said Town. (Repealed by Statute Law Revision Act 1867 (30 & 31 Vict. c. 59))
Attainder of Earl of Marischal and others Act 1715 (repealed)	1 Geo. 1. St. 2. c. 42	7 May 1716
An Act for the Attainder of George Earl of Marischall, William Earl of Seaforth, James Earl of Southesque, James Earl of Panmuir, and others, of High Treason, unless they shall render themselves to Justice by a Day certain, therein mentioned. (Repealed by Statute Law (Repeals) Act 1977 (c. 18))
Taxation Act 1715 (repealed)	1 Geo. 1. St. 2. c. 43	26 June 1716
An Act to continue Duties for encouraging the Coinage of Money; and to charge the Duties on Senna as a Medicinal Drug; and for the appropriating several Supplies granted to His Majesty. (Repealed by Statute Law Revision Act 1867 (30 & 31 Vict. c. 59))
Glasgow Beer Duties Act 1715 (repealed)	1 Geo. 1. St. 2. c. 44	26 June 1716
An Act for the continuing the Duty of Two Pennies Scots, or One Sixth of a Penny Sterling, on every Pint of Ale and Beer that shall be vended or sold within the City of Glasgow and Privilege thereof, for the Benefit of the said City. (Repealed by Statute Law Revision Act 1948 (11 & 12 Geo. 6. c. 62))
Assizes for Cornwall Act 1715 (repealed)	1 Geo. 1. St. 2. c. 45	26 June 1716
An Act for holding the Assize for the County of Cornwal at a convenient Place within the said County. (Repealed by Statute Law Revision Act 1867 (30 & 31 Vict. c. 59))
Tobacco Act 1715 (repealed)	1 Geo. 1. St. 2. c. 46	26 June 1716
An Act to prevent the Mischiefs by manufacturing Leaves, or other Things, to resemble Tobacco; and the Abuses in making and mixing of Snuff. (Repealed by Tobacco Act 1840 (3 & 4 Vict. c. 18))
Persuading Soldiers to Desert, etc. Act 1715 (repealed)	1 Geo. 1. St. 2. c. 47	26 June 1716
An Act for the more effectual and exemplary Punishment of such Persons as shall seduce Soldiers to desert, or who, being Papists, shall inlist themselves in His Majesty's Service, in Great Britain or Ireland, or in the Islands of Jersey or Guernsey. (Repealed by Statute Law Revision Act 1867 (30 & 31 Vict. c. 59))
Preservation of Timber Trees Act 1715 (repealed)	1 Geo. 1. St. 2. c. 48	26 June 1716
An Act to encourage the planting of Timber Trees, Fruit Trees, and other Trees, for Ornament, Shelter, or Profit; and for the better Preservation of the same; and for the preventing the burning of Woods. (Repealed by Statute Law Revision Act 1887 (50 & 51 Vict. c. 59))
Bridlington Pier Act 1715 (repealed)	1 Geo. 1. St. 2. c. 49	26 June 1716
An Act to revive and continue an Act of the Eighth and Ninth Years of the Reign of His late Majesty King William, (Note: Bridlington Piers Act 1696 (8 & 9 Will. 3. c. 29)) for Repair of the Piers of Bridlington, alias Burlington, in the East Riding of the County of York. (Repealed by Bridlington Piers and Harbour Act 1837 (7 Will. 4 & 1 Vict. c. cx))
Crown Lands (Forfeited Estates) Act 1715 (repealed)	1 Geo. 1. St. 2. c. 50	26 June 1716
An Act for appointing Commissioners to inquire of the Estates of certain Traitors, and of Popish Recusants, and of Estates given to superstitious Uses, in order to raise Money out of them, severally, for the Use of the Public. (Repealed by Roman Catholic Relief Act 1926 (16 & 17 Geo. 5. c. 55))
Sovereign's Power to go Abroad (Restriction Repealed) Act 1715 (repealed)	1 Geo. 1. St. 2. c. 51	26 June 1716
An Act for repealing so much of the Act of the Twelfth and Thirteenth Years of the Reign of King William the Third, intituled, "An Act for the further Limitation of the Crown, and better securing the Rights and Liberties of the Subject," (Note: Act of Settlement (12 & 13 Will. 3. c. 2)) as enacts, "That no Person who should come to the Possession of the Crown shall go out of the Dominions of England, Scotland, or Ireland, without Consent of Parliament." (Repealed by Statute Law Revision Act 1867 (30 & 31 Vict. c. 59))
Highways Act 1715 (repealed)	1 Geo. 1. St. 2. c. 52	26 June 1716
An Act for making the Laws for repairing the Highways more effectual. (Repealed by Highways (No. 2) Act 1766 (7 Geo. 3. c. 42))
Attainder of Thomas Forster and others Act 1715 (repealed)	1 Geo. 1. St. 2. c. 53	26 June 1716
An Act for the Attainder of Thomas Forster Junior Esquire and William Mackintosh Esquire (commonly called Brigadier Mackintosh) of High Treason. (Repealed by Statute Law (Repeals) Act 1977 (c. 18))
Highlands Services Act 1715 or the Highland Services Act 1715 or the Disarming Act 1715 (repealed)	1 Geo. 1. St. 2. c. 54	26 June 1716
An Act for the more effectual securing the Peace of The Highlands in Scotland. (Repealed by Statute Law (Repeals) Act 1975 (c. 10))
Papists Act 1715 (repealed)	1 Geo. 1. St. 2. c. 55	26 June 1716
An Act to oblige Papists to register their Names and Real Estates. (Repealed by Roman Catholic Relief Act 1791 (31 Geo. 3. c. 32))
Crown Pensioners Disqualification Act 1715 (repealed)	1 Geo. 1. St. 2. c. 56	26 June 1716
An Act to disable any Person from being chose a Member of, or from sitting and voting in, the House of Commons, who has any Pension for any Number of Years from the Crown. (Repealed by House of Commons Disqualification Act 1957 (5 & 6 Eliz. 2. c. 20))
Hackney Coaches, etc. Act 1715 (repealed)	1 Geo. 1. St. 2. c. 57	26 June 1716
An Act for the better regulating Hackney Coaches, Carts, Drays, Cars, and Waggons, within the Cities of London and Westminster, and the Weekly Bills of Mortality; and for preventing Mischiefs occasioned by the Drivers riding upon such Carts, Drays, Cars, and Waggons. (Repealed by Statute Law Revision Act 1867 (30 & 31 Vict. c. 59))

=== Private acts ===
Short title	Citation	Royal assent
Long title
Enabling the Barons of the Court of Exchequer in Ireland to grant a commission to persons in England to administer to Henry Temple and Luke King, the oaths of their office of Remembrancer of the Court of Exchequer in Ireland.	1 Geo. 1. St. 2. c. 1 Pr.	11 May 1715
An Act to empower the Barons of the Court of Exchequer in Ireland to grant a Commission to some Persons in England, to administer to Henry Temple Esquire and Luke King Gentleman the usual Oaths, for the due Execution of their Office of Remembrancer of the Court of Exchequer in Ireland.
Enabling the Barons of the Court of Exchequer in Ireland to grant a commission to some of the Barons of the Court of Exchequer in England to administer to Thomas Hopkins the usual oaths for the due execution of the office of Searcher, Packer and Gauger in the Port of Dublin.	1 Geo. 1. St. 2. c. 2 Pr.	11 May 1715
An Act to empower the Barons of the Court of Exchequer in Ireland to grant a Commission to some of the Barons of the Court of Exchequer in England, to administer to Thomas Hopkins Esquire the usual Oaths, for the due Execution of the Office, or Offices, of Searcher, Packer, and Gauger, in the Port of Dublin.
Robert, Marquis of Lindsey, Great Chamberlain of England: settling his precedency when made a Duke of Great Britain.	1 Geo. 1. St. 2. c. 3 Pr.	20 July 1715
An Act for settling the Precedency of Robert Marquis of Lindsey, Great Chamberlain of England, when created a Duke of Great Britain, and of such as shall succeed to the said Honour.
Digby's Estate Act 1715	1 Geo. 1. St. 2. c. 4 Pr.	20 July 1715
An Act for appointing Persons to take Care of the Person and Estate of John Digby Esquire, Eldest Son and Heir Apparent of William Lord Digby in the Kingdom of Ireland.
Vesting in All Souls' College houses and ground belonging to St. Mary's parish, Oxford.	1 Geo. 1. St. 2. c. 5 Pr.	20 July 1715
An Act for vesting in the Warden and College of All Souls, in Oxford, and their Successors, certain Houses and Ground, belonging to the Parish of St. Mary in Oxford.
Enabling the Barons of the Court of Exchequer in Ireland to grant a commission to persons in Great Britain to administer to Henry Temple the oaths of office of Chief Remembrancer of the Court of Exchequer in Ireland.	1 Geo. 1. St. 2. c. 6 Pr.	20 July 1715
An Act to empower the Barons of the Court of Exchequer in Ireland to grant a Commission to some Persons in Great Britain, to administer to Henry Temple Esquire the usual Oaths, for due Execution of the Office of Chief Remembrancer of the Court of Exchequer in Ireland.
Betts' Estate Act 1715	1 Geo. 1. St. 2. c. 7 Pr.	20 July 1715
An Act for Sale of Part of the Estate late of William Betts Gentleman, deceased, for discharging Incumbrances thereupon; and for making good a Settlement by him made of other Part of his Estate.
Trenchard's Estate Act 1715	1 Geo. 1. St. 2. c. 8 Pr.	20 July 1715
An Act to enable Trustees to grant Leases of Part of the Lands devised by the last Will and Testament of Thomas Trenchard Esquire, deceased.
Relief of William Paterson.	1 Geo. 1. St. 2. c. 9 Pr.	20 July 1715
An Act for relieving William Paterson Esquire, out of the Equivalent-money, for what is due to him.
Goebell's Naturalization Act 1715	1 Geo. 1. St. 2. c. 10 Pr.	20 July 1715
An Act to naturalize Florian Goebell Merchant.
Meyer's Naturalization Act 1715	1 Geo. 1. St. 2. c. 11 Pr.	20 July 1715
An Act for naturalizing Herman Meiier.
Hertford and Middlesex Highways Act 1715	1 Geo. 1. St. 2. c. 12 Pr.	2 August 1715
An Act for repairing the Highways through the several Parishes of St. Michael, St. Albans, St. Peter, Shenly Ridge, and South Mims, in the Counties of Hertford and Middlesex.
Sale of reversion of manor of Darrington by George, Earl of Cardigan to Theophilus Shelton.	1 Geo. 1. St. 2. c. 13 Pr.	2 August 1715
An Act for confirming the Sale of the Reversion of the Manor of Darrington, by George Earl of Cardigan, to Theophilus Shelton Esquire and his Heirs.
Fry's Estate Act 1715	1 Geo. 1. St. 2. c. 14 Pr.	2 August 1715
An Act for vesting in Trustees Part of the Estate of Nicholas Fry Esquire, deceased, for Payment of his Debts.
Enabling Henry, Earl of Rochester and William, Viscount Mountjoy to take the oaths of office for their offices in Ireland and to qualify themselves for the enjoyment of those offices in England.	1 Geo. 1. St. 2. c. 15 Pr.	20 August 1715
An Act to enable the Right Honourable Henry Earl of Rochester, and William Lord Viscount Mountjoy in the Kingdom of Ireland, to take the Oaths of Office for their respective Offices in the said Kingdom of Ireland; and to qualify themselves in England for the legal Enjoyment of their said Offices.
Panton's Estate Act 1715	1 Geo. 1. St. 2. c. 16 Pr.	20 August 1715
An Act for explaining an Act, made in the Ninth Year of the Reign of King William the Third, intituled, "An Act for vesting Part of the Estate of Thomas Panton Esquire in Trustees, to be sold, for Payment of Debts, and securing a Jointure to Mary his now Wife;" (Note: Thomas Panton's Estate Act 1696 (8 & 9 Will. 3. c. 16 Pr.)) and for other Purposes therein mentioned.
Courtenay's Estate Act 1715	1 Geo. 1. St. 2. c. 17 Pr.	20 August 1715
An Act for vesting certain Manors and Lands, in the Counties of Devon and Kent, the Estate of Sir William Courtenay Baronet, in Trustees and their Heirs, to be sold; and, with the Money arising thereby, to purchase other Lands in the County of Devon, contiguous to the Seat of his Family, to be settled to the same Uses.
Wynche's Estate Act 1715	1 Geo. 1. St. 2. c. 18 Pr.	20 August 1715
An Act to enable Sir Richard Wynche Baronet, and Humphry Wynche Esquire only Son and Heir Apparent of the said Sir Richard Wynche, to settle a Jointure upon such Woman as the said Humphrey Wynche shall marry.
Heneage's Estate Act 1715	1 Geo. 1. St. 2. c. 19 Pr.	20 August 1715
An Act to enable George Heneage Esquire to sell the Rectory of North Willingham, in the County of Lincoln, and some Lands there; and for settling Rent-charges of greater Value in Lieu thereof; and for other Purposes therein mentioned.
Lee's Estate Act 1715	1 Geo. 1. St. 2. c. 20 Pr.	20 August 1715
An Act to enable Richard Lee, an Infant, with the Consent of Trustees, to grant Leases of some Part of his Estate, notwithstanding his Minority.
St George's Church Liverpool Act 1715	1 Geo. 1. St. 2. c. 21 Pr.	30 August 1715
An Act for building and endowing a Church upon the Scite of the Castle of Liverpoole, held by Lease from the Dutchy of Lancaster; and for explaining a former Act (Note: Liverpool Act 1698 (10 Will. 3. c. 36 Pr.)) for the building another Church there.
John Tanner's Estate Act 1715	1 Geo. 1. St. 2. c. 22 Pr.	30 August 1715
An Act for vesting the Estate late of John Tanner Esquire, deceased, in Trustees, to be sold, for Payment of his Debts.
Bromfield's Estate Act 1715	1 Geo. 1. St. 2. c. 23 Pr.	30 August 1715
An Act for confirming a Sale already made to Edmund Dummer Gentleman of some Part, and for vesting other Part, of the Estate of John Bromfield Esquire, in the County of Southampton, comprized in the Articles made upon his Marriage with Anne his Wife, in Trustees, to be sold, for the Payment of his Debts; and for settling the remaining Part thereof as near as may be to the Intent of the said Articles; and for making thereby, and by other Means in the Act mentioned, some Provision for the said John Bromfield and Ann his Wife, and their Issue.
Kennet Navigation Act 1715	1 Geo. 1. St. 2. c. 24 Pr.	21 September 1715
An Act to make the River Kennet navigable, from Reading to Newbury, in the County of Berks.
Repair of Highways between Tyburn and Uxbridge Act 1715 (repealed)	1 Geo. 1. St. 2. c. 25 Pr.	21 September 1715
An Act for repairing and amending the Highways between Tyburn and Uxbridge, in the County of Middlesex. (Repealed by Roads between Tyburn and Uxbridge Act 1826 (7 Geo. 4. c. lxxvi))
Enabling Richard Viscount Rosse to settle a jointure on his wife Mary and make a settlement for his issue male, with provision for younger children, despite his minority, and other provisions.	1 Geo. 1. St. 2. c. 26 Pr.	21 September 1715
An Act to enable Richard Lord Viscount Rosse of the Kingdom of Ireland, notwithstanding his Nonage, to settle a Jointure on Mary Viscountess Rosse his Wife, and make a Settlement on his Issue Male, with Provisions for Younger Children; and for other Purposes therein mentioned.
Relief of Anne Milner, Thomas Colmore, William Hunt, William Parrott and others as to customs of goods destroyed in the fire at Thames Street, London.	1 Geo. 1. St. 2. c. 27 Pr.	21 September 1715
An Act for the Relief of Ann Milner, Thomas Colemore, William Hunt, William Parrott, and others, as to Customs of Goods burnt or destroyed by the late Fire in Thames-Street, London.
Hoskins' Estate Act 1715	1 Geo. 1. St. 2. c. 28 Pr.	21 September 1715
An Act to enable Sir Hungerford Hoskins Baronet to raise Monies, to discharge his Brothers and Sisters Portions, and to settle a Jointure on a Wife.
Cope's Estate Act 1715	1 Geo. 1. St. 2. c. 29 Pr.	21 September 1715
An Act to enable Robert Cope Esquire to settle an additional Jointure, out of his Estate, on Elizabeth his now Wife, and also to raise Portions and Maintenances for his Daughters and Younger Children by her; and to enable those in Remainder to do the same.
Sale of part of the manor of Low Laiton (Essex) and laying out the proceeds in the purchase of lands in Lincolnshire to be settled to the same uses.	1 Geo. 1. St. 2. c. 30 Pr.	21 September 1715
An Act for the Sale of Part of the Manor of Low Laiton, in the County of Essex, and other Lands there; and for laying out the Money arising thereby in the Purchase of other Lands, in the County of Lincoln, to be settled to the same Uses as the said Part of the Manor of Low Laiton is settled.
Naturalization of Frederica Countess of Holderness, Peter Gravier, Theodore Bouchier and Francis Masson.	1 Geo. 1. St. 2. c. 31 Pr.	21 September 1715
An Act to naturalize Frederica Countess of Holderness, Peter Gravier, Theodore Boucher, and Francis Masson.
Naturalization of Robert de Ultegar, George Christian Luders and Others Act 1715	1 Geo. 1. St. 2. c. 32 Pr.	21 September 1715
An Act to naturalize Robert de Vlieger, George Christian Luders, and others.
Cornelison's Naturalization Act 1715	1 Geo. 1. St. 2. c. 33 Pr.	17 February 1716
An Act for naturalizing Henry Cornelisen.
Vesting Duke of Atholl in James Murray Act 1715	1 Geo. 1. St. 2. c. 34 Pr.	23 March 1716
An Act for vesting the Honour and Estate of John Duke of Atholl in James Murray Esquire, commonly called Lord James Murray, after the Death of the said Duke.
Guliker's Naturalization Act 1715	1 Geo. 1. St. 2. c. 35 Pr.	23 March 1716
An Act for the Naturalization of Frederick Guliker.
Roeters' Naturalization Act 1715	1 Geo. 1. St. 2. c. 36 Pr.	23 March 1716
An Act for naturalizing Gerard Roeters.
Middlesex and Hertfordshire Roads Act 1715 (repealed)	1 Geo. 1. St. 2. c. 37 Pr.	7 May 1716
An Act for continuing and making more effectual an Act passed in the Twelfth Year of Her late Majesty's Reign, intituled, "An Act for repairing the Highway, or Road, from The Stones-end, in the Parish of S't Leonard Shoreditch, in the County of Middlesex, to the furthermost Part of the Northern Road, in the Parish of Endfield, in the same County, next to the Parish of Cheshunt, in the County of Hertford." (Note: Shoreditch Highways Act 1712 (12 Ann. c. 19)) (Repealed by Middlesex Roads Act 1789 (29 Geo. 3. c. 96))
Enabling the Prince of Wales to qualify himself in Great Britain for the legal enjoyment of the office of Chancellor of the University of Dublin.	1 Geo. 1. St. 2. c. 38 Pr.	7 May 1716
An Act to enable his Royal Highness George Prince of Wales to qualify himself in Great Britain for the legal Enjoyment of the Office of Chancellor of the University of Dublin, in the Kingdom of Ireland.
Enabling Charles Earl of Sunderland and Henry Earl of Rochester to take in Great Britain the oath of office of Vice Treasurer, Receiver General and Paymaster General of His Majesty's revenues in Ireland and to qualify themselves for the enjoyment of the office.	1 Geo. 1. St. 2. c. 39 Pr.	7 May 1716
An Act to enable Charles Earl of Sunderland and Henry Earl of Rochester to take in Great Britain the Oath of Office, as Vice Treasurer and Receiver General and Paymaster General of all His Majesty's Revenues in the Kingdom of Ireland; and to qualify themselves for the Enjoyment of the said Office.
Enabling Richard Earl of Burlington and Cork to take in England the oath of office of High Treasurer of Ireland and to qualify himself in England for the legal enjoyment of the office.	1 Geo. 1. St. 2. c. 40 Pr.	7 May 1716
An Act to enable Richard Earl of Burlington and Corke to take in England the Oath of Office of High Treasurer of Ireland, and to qualify himself here in England for the legal Enjoyment of the said Office.
Vesting in new trustees manors, messuages, lands and hereditaments late of Charles Earl of Dorset and Middlesex of which James Duke of Ormond was seised as surviving trustee at the time of his attainder.	1 Geo. 1. St. 2. c. 41 Pr.	7 May 1716
An Act for vesting several Manors, Messuages, Lands, and Hereditaments, late of Charles Earl of Dorset and Middlesex, whereof James late Duke of Ormond, at the Time of his Attainder, was seised, as surviving Trustee named in the Will of the said Earl, in new Trustees and their Heirs, upon the same Trusts.
Stockton Parish (Amendment) Act 1715	1 Geo. 1. St. 2. c. 42 Pr.	7 May 1716
An Act for explaining and making more effectual an Act passed in the Twelfth Year of the Reign of Her late Majesty Queen Anne, intituled, "An Act for making the Chapelry of Stockton, in the Country of Durham, a distinct Parish." (Note: Stockton Parish Act 1712 (12 Ann. c. 7 Pr.))
White's Naturalization Act 1715	1 Geo. 1. St. 2. c. 43 Pr.	7 May 1716
An Act for naturalizing Caspar White.
Earl of Macclesfield's Restitution Act 1715	1 Geo. 1. St. 2. c. 44 Pr.	26 June 1716
An Act for the more effectual reversing and making void the Attainder of Charles Earl of Macclesfield, deceased.
Discharging Sir Alexander Rigby from his imprisonment and vesting his estate and effects in trustees for the benefit of his creditors.	1 Geo. 1. St. 2. c. 45 Pr.	26 June 1716
An Act to discharge Sir Alexander Rigby Knight from his Imprisonment; and vest his Estate and Effects in Trustees, for the Benefit of his Creditors.
Sunderland's Estate Act 1715	1 Geo. 1. St. 2. c. 46 Pr.	26 June 1716
An Act for vesting certain Lands and Tenements of Peter Sunderland Esquire in Trustees, to be sold, for Payment of Debts charged thereon before the making of his Marriage Settlement, and by Virtue thereof.
Proctor's Estate Act 1715	1 Geo. 1. St. 2. c. 47 Pr.	26 June 1716
An Act to enable Thomas Proctor, of Rock, in the County of Northumberland, Esquire, to raise the Sum of Four Thousand Pounds, out of his Estate, for Payment of his Debts, and making Provision for his Younger Children.
Baroness of Schulenburgh's Naturalization Act 1715	1 Geo. 1. St. 2. c. 48 Pr.	26 June 1716
An Act for naturalizing Erengard Melosine, Baroness of Schulenburg.

=== Sources ===
- Pickering, Danby, ed. (1764). "Anno primo Georgii I. Stat. 2". The Statutes at Large. Vol. 13: From the Twelfth Year of Queen Anne to the Fifth Year of King George I. Cambridge: Joseph Bentham. pp. 137–323 – via Internet Archive.
- Pickering, Danby, ed. (1764). "Anno primo Georgii I. Stat. 2". The Statutes at Large. Vol. 13: From the Twelfth Year of Queen Anne to the Fifth Year of King George I. Cambridge: Joseph Bentham. pp. 137–323 – via Google Books.
- Pickering, Danby, ed. (1764). "Anno primo Georgii I. Stat. 2". The Statutes at Large. Vol. 13: From the Twelfth Year of Queen Anne to the Fifth Year of King George I. Cambridge: Joseph Bentham. pp. 137–323 – via Internet Archive.
- Pickering, Danby, ed. (1764). "Anno primo Georgii I. Stat. 2". The Statutes at Large. Vol. 13: From the Twelfth Year of Queen Anne to the Fifth Year of King George I. Cambridge: Joseph Bentham. pp. 137–323 – via Internet Archive.
- Pickering, Danby, ed. (1764). "Anno primo Georgii I. Stat. 2". The Statutes at Large. Vol. 13: From the Twelfth Year of Queen Anne to the Fifth Year of King George I. Cambridge: Joseph Bentham. pp. 137–323 – via Google Books.
- Journals of the House of Commons. Vol. 18. London: His Majesty's Stationery Office. 1803. pp. 16–471 – via Google Books.
- Chronological Table of and Index to the Statutes. Vol. 1: To the End of the Session 59 Vict. Sess. 2 (1895) (13th ed.). London: Her Majesty's Stationery Office. 1896. p. 92-93 – via Google Books.
- "Acts of the Parliament of Great Britain from 1715". legislation.gov.uk. The National Archives.

== See also ==
- List of acts of the Parliament of Great Britain
