= List of acts of the Parliament of Great Britain from 1764 =

This is a complete list of acts of the Parliament of Great Britain for the year 1764.

For acts passed until 1707, see the list of acts of the Parliament of England and the list of acts of the Parliament of Scotland. See also the list of acts of the Parliament of Ireland.

For acts passed from 1801 onwards, see the list of acts of the Parliament of the United Kingdom. For acts of the devolved parliaments and assemblies in the United Kingdom, see the list of acts of the Scottish Parliament, the list of acts of the Northern Ireland Assembly, and the list of acts and measures of Senedd Cymru; see also the list of acts of the Parliament of Northern Ireland.

The number shown after each act's title is its chapter number. Acts are cited using this number, preceded by the year(s) of the reign during which the relevant parliamentary session was held; thus the Union with Ireland Act 1800 is cited as "39 & 40 Geo. 3. c. 67", meaning the 67th act passed during the session that started in the 39th year of the reign of George III and which finished in the 40th year of that reign. Note that the modern convention is to use Arabic numerals in citations (thus "41 Geo. 3" rather than "41 Geo. III"). Acts of the last session of the Parliament of Great Britain and the first session of the Parliament of the United Kingdom are both cited as "41 Geo. 3".

Acts passed by the Parliament of Great Britain did not have a short title; however, some of these acts have subsequently been given a short title by acts of the Parliament of the United Kingdom (such as the Short Titles Act 1896).

Before the Acts of Parliament (Commencement) Act 1793 came into force on 8 April 1793, acts passed by the Parliament of Great Britain were deemed to have come into effect on the first day of the session in which they were passed. Because of this, the years given in the list below may in fact be the year before a particular act was passed.

== 4 Geo. 3 ==
Continuing the third session of the 12th Parliament of Great Britain, which met from 15 November 1763 until 19 April 1764.

This session was also traditionally cited as 4 G. 3.

=== Public acts ===
Short title	Citation	Royal assent
Long title
Kirby, Westmorland (Small Debts) Act 1764 (repealed)	4 Geo. 3. c. 41	19 April 1764
An Act for the more easy and speedy Recovery of small Debts in the Town and Parish of Kirkby in Kendal, in the County of Westmorland. (Repealed by County Courts Act 1846 (9 & 10 Vict. c. 95))
Shillingford Roads and Bridge Act 1764 (repealed)	4 Geo. 3. c. 42	19 December 1763
An Act for repairing and widening the Road from Shillingford in the County of Oxford, through Wallingford and Pangborne, to Reading in the County of Berks; and for building a Bridge over the River Thames, at or near Shillingford Ferry. (Repealed by Shillingford and Reading Road and Shillingford Bridge Act 1805 (45 Geo. 3. c. xxv) and Shillingford and Reading Road Act 1827 (7 & 8 Geo. 4. c. xix))
Hackney Poor Relief Act 1764 (repealed)	4 Geo. 3. c. 43	21 March 1764
An Act for maintaining, regulating, and employing, the Poor within the Parish of Saint John at Hackney, in the County of Middlesex; and for lighting the said Parish, and establishing a regular Nightly Watch therein. (Repealed by London Government (Borough of Hackney) Order in Council 1901 (SR&O 1901/268))
Sussex Roads Act 1764 (repealed)	4 Geo. 3. c. 44	21 March 1764
An Act for repairing and widening the Roads from Horsham in the County of Sussex, through the Parishes of Shipley, West Grinsted, Ashurst, Steyning, Bramber, and Breeding, in the said County. (Repealed by Horsham and Steyning and Beeding Road Act 1828 (9 Geo. 4. c. lxx))
Lancashire and Cheshire Roads Act 1764 (repealed)	4 Geo. 3. c. 45	21 March 1764
An Act to amend and render more effectual several Acts of Parliament, for repairing the Roads from Sherbrooke Hill near Buxton and Chappell in the Frith in the County of Derby, through the Town of Stockport in the County of Chester, to Manchester in the County of Lancaster, and other Roads in the said Acts mentioned; and for turning and diverting the Roads from Whaley Bridge to Chappel in the Frith and to Sparrow Pit Gate, and from Whaley Bridge to the Western End of Longside Common in the County of Chester. (Repealed by Manchester to Buxton Road Act 1793 (33 Geo. 3. c. 171))
Dunbar Beer Duties Act 1764 (repealed)	4 Geo. 3. c. 46	21 March 1764
An Act to continue an Act passed in the Tenth Year of the Reign of His late Majesty King George the Second, (Note: Dunbar Beer Duties Act 1736 (10 Geo. 2. c. 4)) for continuing an Act passed in the Fifth Year of the Reign of His late Majesty King George the First, intituled, "An Act for laying a Duty of Two Pennies Scots, or One Sixth Part of a Penny Sterling, upon every Pint of Ale or Beer that shall be vended or sold within the Town of Dunbar; for improving and preserving the Harbour, and repairing the Town-house, and building a School and other public Buildings there; and for supplying the said Town with fresh Water." (Note: Dunbar Beer Duties Act 1718 (5 Geo. 1. c. 16)) (Repealed by Statute Law Revision Act 1948 (11 & 12 Geo. 6. c. 62))
Wiltshire and Hampshire Roads Act 1764 (repealed)	4 Geo. 3. c. 47	21 March 1764
An Act for repairing and widening the Roads from the End of Stanbridge Lane near a Barn in the Parish of Romsey to the Turnpike Road at Middle Wallop, and from the Turnpike Road between Stanbridge Lane aforesaid and Great Bridge to the Turnpike Road at Stockbridge, and from the Garden of Henry Hattat at Awbridge to the Garden Wall of Denys Rolle Esquire at East Tuderley, and from Lockerley Mill Stream to East Dean Gate, and from the said Garden Wall to the Turnpike Road leading from Stockbridge aforesaid, in the County of Southampton, to Salisbury. (Repealed by Romsey, Stockbridge and Wallop Roads Act 1827 (7 & 8 Geo. 4. c. lxi))
Callington Roads Act 1764 (repealed)	4 Geo. 3. c. 48	21 March 1764
An Act for repairing and widening several Roads leading from Callington, in the County of Cornwall. (Repealed by Callington Roads (Cornwall) Act 1827 (7 & 8 Geo. 4. c. ci) (Note: Incorrectly cited as "7 & 8 Geo. 4. c. lxi" in the Chronological Table of the Statutes.))
Bank of England Buildings Act 1764 (repealed)	4 Geo. 3. c. 49	21 March 1764
An Act to enable the Governor and Company of the Bank of England to purchase Houses and Ground, for opening a Passage for Carriages from Cornhill to The Bank, and making more commodious several other Passages leading thereto; and for enlarging the Buildings of the said Bank, and making the same more commodious. (Repealed by Statute Law (Repeals) Act 1995 (c. 44))
Mercer's Company (London) Act 1764	4 Geo. 3. c. 50	5 April 1764
An Act for the Relief of the Bond and other Creditors of the Wardens and Commonalty of the Mystery of Mercers of the City of London.
Burton-upon-Trent and Derby Road Act 1764 (repealed)	4 Geo. 3. c. 51	21 March 1764
An Act for continuing and enlarging the Term and Powers of an Act, made in the Twenty-sixth Year of the Reign of His late Majesty King George the Second, intituled, "An Act for repairing and widening the Road from the West End of the Town of Burton upon Trent in the County of Stafford, through the said Town, to the South End of the Town of Derby in the County of Derby." (Note: Burton-upon-Trent and Derby Road Act 1753 (26 Geo. 2. c. 59)) (Repealed by Burton-upon-Trent and Derby Road Act 1818 (58 Geo. 3. c. xxxvi))
Worksop and Attercliffe Road Act 1764 (repealed)	4 Geo. 3. c. 52	21 March 1764
An Act for repairing and widening the Road from Worksop in the County of Nottingham, through the Towns of Galeforth, Anston, Aston, Handsworth, and Darnall, to the North East End of Attercliffe in the County of York, where the same joins the Turnpike Road from Bawtry to Sheffield. (Repealed by Worksop and Attercliffe Road Act 1825 (6 Geo. 4. c. cxlvi))
Lincoln Roads Act 1764 (repealed)	4 Geo. 3. c. 53	21 March 1764
An Act for repairing and widening the Roads from the High Bridge in Spalding to a certain Place called Tydd Goat in the County of Lincoln, and from, Sutton Saint Mary's to Sutton Wash in the said County. (Repealed by Spalding and Tydd Goat Road Act 1827 (7 & 8 Geo. 4. c. lvi) (Note: Incorrectly cited as "7 & 8 Geo. 4. c. vi" in the Chronological Table of the Statutes.))
South London Roads Act 1764 (repealed)	4 Geo. 3. c. 54	5 April 1764
An Act for enlarging the Term and Powers granted by an Act passed in the Twenty-fourth Year of the Reign of His late Majesty, intituled, "An Act for making, widening, and keeping in Repair, several Roads, in the several Parishes of Lambeth, Newington, Saint George Southwark, and Bermondsey, in the County of Surrey, and Lewisham in the County of Kent;" (Note: Southwark Roads Act 1750 (24 Geo. 2. c. 58)) and for repairing Lambeth Back Lane; and for lighting and watching the said Roads. (Repealed by Statute Law (Repeals) Act 2013 (c. 2))
St. Clement Danes (Poor Relief, etc.) Act 1764 (repealed)	4 Geo. 3. c. 55	5 April 1764
An Act for establishing a regular and Nightly Watch, and for maintaining, regulating, and employing, the Poor, within the Parish of Saint Clement Danes, in the Liberty of Westminster and County of Middlesex. (Repealed by London Government (City of Westminster) Order in Council 1901 (SR&O 1901/278))
Blything, Suffolk (Poor Relief) Act 1764 (repealed)	4 Geo. 3. c. 56	5 April 1764
An Act for the better Relief and Employment of the Poor in the Hundred of Blything, in the County of Suffolk. (Repealed by Statute Law Revision Act 1948 (11 & 12 Geo. 6. c. 62))
Bosmere and Claydon, Suffolk (Poor Relief) Act 1764 (repealed)	4 Geo. 3. c. 57	5 April 1764
An Act for the better Relief and Employment of the Poor in the Hundred of Bosmere and Claydon, in the County of Suffolk. (Repealed by Bosmere and Claydon Poor Relief Act 1833 (3 & 4 Will. 4. c. ii))
Carlford, Suffolk (Poor Relief) Act 1764 (repealed)	4 Geo. 3. c. 58	5 April 1764
An Act to amend and render more effectual an Act passed in the Twenty-ninth Year of the Reign of His late Majesty King George the Second, intituled, "An Act for the better Relief and Employment of the Poor in the Hundreds of Colneis and Carlford, in the County of Suffolk." (Note: Carlford, Suffolk (Poor Relief) Act 1756 (29 Geo. 2. c. 79)) (Repealed by Colneis and Carlford Hundreds, Suffolk Poor Relief Act 1790 (30 Geo. 3. c. 22))
Samford, Suffolk (Poor Relief) Act 1764 (repealed)	4 Geo. 3. c. 59	5 April 1764
An Act for the better Relief and Employment of the Poor in the Hundred of Samford, in the County of Suffolk. (Repealed by Samford Poor Relief Act 1799 (39 Geo. 3. c. xlii))
Gloucester (Poor Relief, etc.) Act 1764 (repealed)	4 Geo. 3. c. 60	5 April 1764
An Act for the more effectual Relief and Employment of the Poor within the City of Gloucester; and for lighting the Streets of the said City. (Repealed by Gloucester Gas and Poor Relief Act 1819 (59 Geo. 3. c. lxix), Municipal Corporations Act 1835 (5 & 6 Will. 4. c. 76) and Local Government Supplemental Act 1865 (No. 3) (28 & 29 Vict. c. 41))
Nottinghamshire Roads Act 1764 (repealed)	4 Geo. 3. c. 61	5 April 1764
An Act for repairing and widening the Road from Derby to Mansfield, in the County of Nottingham, and several other Roads therein mentioned. (Repealed by Derby, Mansfield and Nuttall Roads Act 1830 (11 Geo. 4 & 1 Will. 4. c. xcv))
Hereford and Gloucester Roads Act 1764 (repealed)	4 Geo. 3. c. 62	5 April 1764
An Act for continuing the Terms of, and amending, the Acts for repairing several Roads leading from Ledbury, in the County of Hereford; and for widening and amending the Road through the Parish of Bromesberrow in the County of Gloucester, and through Corse Lawn, till it meets the Road from Gloucester to Worcester. (Repealed by Hereford and Gloucester Roads Act 1789 (29 Geo. 3. c. 104))
Milford to Portsmouth Road Act 1764 (repealed)	4 Geo. 3. c. 63	5 April 1764
An Act for amending and widening the Road from a Place near the Village of Milford, through Haslemere, to the Portsmouth Road between Lippock and Rake, in the several Counties of Surrey, Sussex, and Southampton. (Repealed by Road through Haslemere Act 1808 (48 Geo. 3. c. cxxxviii) and Milford and Haslemere Road Act 1831 (1 Will. 4. c. xxviii))
Tinsley and Doncaster Road Act 1764 (repealed)	4 Geo. 3. c. 64	5 April 1764
An Act for amending and widening the Road from Tinsley in the County of York, to the Town of Doncaster in the said County. (Repealed by Tinsley and Doncaster Turnpike Road Act 1826 (7 Geo. 4. c. lxxxix))
Derby and Yorkshire Roads Act 1764 (repealed)	4 Geo. 3. c. 65	5 April 1764
An Act for amending and widening the Road from the South End of the Town of Rotherham in the County of York, to the present Turnpike Road near Pleasley in the County of Derby; and also the Road from the North End of the said Town of Rotherham into the present Turnpike Road on the East Side of Tankersley Park in the said County of York. (Repealed by Rotherham and Tankersley Park Turnpike Road Act 1825 (6 Geo. 4. c. lii) and Rotherham and Pleasley Turnpike Road Act 1826 (7 Geo. 4. c. lxxxviii))
Kingston-upon-Hull and Beverley Road Act 1764 (repealed)	4 Geo. 3. c. 66	5 April 1764
An Act to continue the Term, and enlarge the Powers, of an Act passed in the Seventeenth Year of the Reign of His late Majesty, (Note: Kingston-upon-Hull and Beverley Road Act 1743 (17 Geo. 2. c. 25)) for repairing the Road between the Town of Kingston upon Hull and the Town of Beverley in the East Riding of the County of York; and for repairing the Road from Newland Bridge to the West End of the Town of Cottingham in the said Riding. (Repealed by Kingston-upon-Hull and Beverley, and Newland Bridge and Cottingham Roads (Yorkshire, East Riding) Act 1833 (3 & 4 Will. 4. c. xciii))
Derby and Nottinghamshire Roads Act 1764 (repealed)	4 Geo. 3. c. 67	5 April 1764
An Act for repairing, widening, and keeping in Repair, the High Roads leading from Alfreton in the County of Derby, through Carter's Lane, to a certain Place in the Town of Mansfield called Stockwell; and from the Bridle Gate at the Division of the Liberties of Blackwell and Hucknall, through the Town of Sutton in Ashfield, to the Mansfield and Newark Turnpike at or near Python Hill in the Forest of Sherwood in the County of Nottingham. (Repealed by Alfreton and Mansfield Road Act 1812 (52 Geo. 3. c. vii) and Annual Turnpike Acts Continuance Act 1876 (39 & 40 Vict. c. 39) (Note: Incorrectly cited as "Annual Turnpike Acts Continuance, 1763 c 39" in the Chronological Table of the Statutes.))
Rochdale to Burnley Road Act 1764 (repealed)	4 Geo. 3. c. 68	5 April 1764
An Act for continuing and enlarging the Term and Powers of an Act made in the Twenty-eighth Year of the Reign of His late Majesty King George the Second, intituled, "An Act for repairing and widening the Road from Rochdale to Burnley, in the County of Lancaster." (Note: Rochdale to Burnley Road Act 1755 (28 Geo. 2. c. 53)) (Repealed by Rochdale and Burnley Road Act 1798 (38 Geo. 3. c. li))
Whitby and Middleton Road Act 1764 (repealed)	4 Geo. 3. c. 69	5 April 1764
An Act for repairing and widening the Road from the West End of Baxter Gate in the Town of Whitby, to the South End of Lockton Lane in the Parish of Middleton in the County of York. (Repealed by Whitby and Middleton Road Act 1827 (7 & 8 Geo. 4. c. liii))
Salop Roads Act 1764 (repealed)	4 Geo. 3. c. 70	5 April 1764
An Act for enlarging the Term and Powers of Two Acts, of the Twelfth of King George the First and of the Third of His late Majesty, for repairing several Roads therein mentioned, in the County of Salop; and also for amending and widening the Road from the Sign of The Horse Shoe in Uckington to Longnor Green, and also from the West End of Hatcham Bridge to The Cross Houses upon the Bridgenorth Turnpike Road, in the said County. (Repealed by Watling Street Road Act 1808 (48 Geo. 3. c. lxv))
Sussex Roads (No. 2) Act 1764 (repealed)	4 Geo. 3. c. 71	5 April 1764
An Act for extending the Provisions of an Act passed in the Twenty-fifth Year of His late Majesty, (Note: Sussex Roads Act 1751 (25 Geo. 2. c. 50)) for repairing the Roads from the North End of Malling Street near Lewes, and other Roads in Sussex, to the Road leading from the North End of Offham to The Spital Barn in Lewes aforesaid. (Repealed by Lewes Roads Act 1821 (1 & 2 Geo. 4. c. xiv))
Dover and Rye Harbour Act 1764 (repealed)	4 Geo. 3. c. 72	5 April 1764
An Act for continuing One Moiety of the Duties granted by an Act of the Eleventh and Twelfth Year of King William the Third, (Note: Dover Harbour Act 1698 (11 Will. 3. c. 5)) for the Repair of Dover Harbour, and which have been, by several other Acts, continued till the Twelfth Day of May One Thousand Seven Hundred and Sixty-five; and for applying the same to completing and keeping in Repair the Harbour of Rye, in the County of Sussex; and for more effectually completing and keeping in Repair the said Harbour. (Repealed by Rye Harbour Act 1797 (37 Geo. 3. c. 130))
Whitby (Improvement) Act 1764 (repealed)	4 Geo. 3. c. 73	5 April 1764
An Act for paving, repairing, and cleansing, the Streets, Lanes, Alleys, and Publick Passages, within the Town of Whitby, in the County of York; and for preventing Encroachments and Annoyances therein; and for regulating the Carriages, Cartmen, and Porters, there. (Repealed by Whitby Improvement Act 1789 (29 Geo. 3. c. 12))
Kingston-upon-Hull (Improvement) Act 1764 (repealed)	4 Geo. 3. c. 74	5 April 1764
An Act for amending, and supplying the Deficiencies of, an Act passed in the Second Year of the Reign of His present Majesty King George the Third, intituled, "An Act to amend and render more effectual several Acts made for cleansing and enlightening the Streets of the Town of Kingston upon Hull, and for preventing Annoyances therein." (Note: Kingston-upon-Hull (Improvement) Act 1762 (2 Geo. 3. c. 70)) (Repealed by Kingston-upon-Hull Improvement Act 1854 (17 & 18 Vict. c. ci))
Wigan (Water Supply) Act 1764	4 Geo. 3. c. 75	5 April 1764
An Act for supplying the Borough and Town of Wigan, in the County of Lancaster, with fresh and wholesome Water.
Beverley and Kexby Bridge Road Act 1764 (repealed)	4 Geo. 3. c. 76	19 April 1764
An Act for repairing and widening the Road from Beverley to Kexby Bridge, in the County of York. (Repealed by Beverley and Kexby Bridge Road (Yorkshire) Act 1828 (9 Geo. 4. c. lxxviii))
Somerset Roads Act 1764 (repealed)	4 Geo. 3. c. 77	19 April 1764
An Act for continuing and enlarging the Term and Powers of an Act, made in the Twenty-sixth Year of the Reign of His late Majesty, intituled, "An Act for repairing and widening the Road leading from Piper's Inn in the Parish of Ashcott in the County of Somerset, to and through Glastonbury and Wells, to the White Post in the Great Western Road to the City of Bath, and from Wells to Rush Hill leading to the City of Bristol;" (Note: Wells Roads Act 1753 (26 Geo. 2. c. 76)) and for repairing and widening several other Roads leading from the City of Wells. (Repealed by Wells (Somerset) Roads and Improvement Act 1821 (1 & 2 Geo. 4. c. xii))
Kent Roads Act 1764 (repealed)	4 Geo. 3. c. 78	19 April 1764
An Act for explaining and amending an Act made in the Twenty-sixth Year of the Reign of His late Majesty King George the Second, intituled, "An Act for amending, widening, and repairing, the Road leading from Dover to Barham Downs, in the County of Kent;" (Note: Kent Roads Act 1753 (26 Geo. 2. c. 68)) and also for amending, widening, and repairing, the Road leading from Cowgate and Archcliffe Fort (Note: Archcliffe Fort, Dover. 51°6′54″N 1°18′24″E) in Dover, through Folkstone, to the Town of Hythe in the said County. (Repealed by Roads from Dover to Barham Downs and Sandgate Act 1823 (4 Geo. 4. c. lxxxi) (Note: The regnal year is omitted in the Chronological Table of the Statutes, which cites the act as "G 4 c lxxxi".))
Gloucester and Worcester Roads Act 1764 (repealed)	4 Geo. 3. c. 79	19 April 1764
An Act to enlarge the Term and Powers of so much of an Act of the Twenty-ninth Year of the Reign of His late Majesty, (Note: Gloucestershire Roads Act 1756 (29 Geo. 2. c. 51)) for repairing and widening several Roads therein described, leading from the Town of Tewkesbury, in the County of Gloucester, as relates to the First District of Roads therein mentioned; and for amending the Road from Comb Hill to a Bridge near Norton Mill in the County of Gloucester, and from Eckington Bridge to join the Turnpike Road which leads from Upton on Severn to Pershore in the County of Worcester. (Repealed by Tewkesbury Roads Act 1818 (58 Geo. 3. c. xxx))
Lincoln Road Act 1764 (repealed)	4 Geo. 3. c. 80	19 April 1764
An Act for repairing and widening the Roads from Spalding High Bridge to the Market Place in Donington, and from the Tenth Mile Stone in the Parish of Gosbertown to the Eighth Mile Stone in the Parish of Wigtoft, in the County of Lincoln. (Repealed by Roads from Spalding High Bridge to Donington Act 1826 (7 Geo. 4. c. lxxxv))
Salop Roads (No. 2) Act 1764 (repealed)	4 Geo. 3. c. 81	19 April 1764
An Act for amending, widening, and keeping in Repair, several Roads leading from the Buck's Head at Watling Street to Beckbury and The New Inn, and from Birches Brook to the Hand Post in the Parish of Kemberton, in the County of Salop. (Repealed by Roads from Watling Street, Birches Brook and Ball's Hill (Salop.) Act 1827 (7 & 8 Geo. 4. c. xv))
Derby Roads Act 1764 (repealed)	4 Geo. 3. c. 82	19 April 1764
An Act for widening and repairing the Road leading from Ashborne in the County of Derby, over Belpar Bridge, to the present Turnpike Road from Sheffield and Chesterfield to Derby, at or near a Place called Openwood Gate, and from Belpar Bridge to Ripley in the County of Derby. (Repealed by Ashbourne and Belper Bridge Road Act 1830 (11 Geo. 4 & 1 Will. 4. c. cxxx))
Nottinghamshire and Derby Roads Act 1764 (repealed)	4 Geo. 3. c. 83	19 April 1764
An Act for repairing and widening the Road from Bramcott Odd House in the County of Nottingham, to the Cross Post upon Smalley Common in the County of Derby, and from Ilkeston to the Towns of Heanor and Shipley in the said County of Derby, and from Trowell in the County of Nottingham to the Town of Nottingham. (Repealed by Roads from Smalley Common and from Ilkeston (Derbyshire, Nottinghamshire) Act 1825 (6 Geo. 4. c. xv))
Leicester Roads Act 1764 (repealed)	4 Geo. 3. c. 84	19 April 1764
An Act for repairing and widening the Roads from Melton Mowbray in the County of Leicester, to the Guide Post in Saint Margaret's Field, Leicester; and from the Town of Leicester to the Town of Lutterworth in the said County, and other Roads therein mentioned. (Repealed by Melton Mowbray Road Act 1805 (45 Geo. 3. c. xlix) and Road from Leicester to Lutterworth Act 1805 (45 Geo. 3. c. lxxvii))
Dumfries and Roxburgh Roads Act 1764 (repealed)	4 Geo. 3. c. 85	19 April 1764
An Act for repairing and widening the Road from Scots Dyke in the County of Dumfries, by or through the Villages of Langholm and Hawick, to Haremoss in the County of Roxburgh. (Repealed by Road from Scots Dyke to Haremoss Act 1807 (47 Geo. 3 Sess. 1. c. xxiv))
Edinburgh and Linlighgow Roads Act 1764 (repealed)	4 Geo. 3. c. 86	19 April 1764
An Act to amend and render more effectual Two several Acts passed in the Twenty-fourth (Note: Edinburgh and Leith Road Act 1750 (24 Geo. 2. c. 35)) and Twenty-eighth (Note: Edinburgh Roads Act 1755 (28 Geo. 2. c. 39)) Years of the Reign of His late Majesty, for repairing the High Roads in the County of Edinburgh, to and from the City of Edinburgh; and from Cramond Bridge to the Town of Queensferry in the County of Linlithgow. (Repealed by Edinburgh Turnpike Roads Act 1835 (5 & 6 Will. 4. c. lxii) and Edinburgh Highways and Bridges Act 1835 (5 & 6 Will. 4. c. lxviii))
Bideford Roads Act 1764 (repealed)	4 Geo. 3. c. 87	19 April 1764
An Act for repairing several Roads leading from the Town of Bideford, in the County of Devon. (Repealed by Bideford Roads Act 1824 (5 Geo. 4. c. cxv))
Glamorgan Roads Act 1764 (repealed)	4 Geo. 3. c. 88	19 April 1764
An Act for amending, widening, and keeping in Repair, several Roads leading from the Town of Cardiff, and several other Towns and Places in the County of Glamorgan. (Repealed by Roads in Glamorgan Act 1805 (45 Geo. 3. c. lxxiv))
Mutford and Lothingland, Suffolk (Poor Relief) Act 1764 (repealed)	4 Geo. 3. c. 89	19 April 1764
An Act for the better Relief and Employment of the Poor in the Hundred of Mutford and Lothingland, in the County of Suffolk. (Repealed by Local Government Board's Provisional Order Confirmation (Poor Law) Act 1892 (55 & 56 Vict. c. cciii))
Loddon and Clavering, Norfolk (Poor Relief) Act 1764 (repealed)	4 Geo. 3. c. 90	19 April 1764
An Act for the better Relief and Employment of the Poor in the Hundreds of Loddon and Clavering, in the County of Norfolk. (Repealed by Statute Law (Repeals) Act 2013 (c. 2))
Wangford, Suffolk (Poor Relief) Act 1764 (repealed)	4 Geo. 3. c. 91	19 April 1764
An Act for the better Relief and Employment of the Poor in the Hundred of Wangford, in the County of Suffolk. (Repealed by Statute Law Revision Act 1948 (11 & 12 Geo. 6. c. 62))
Portsea Improvement Act 1764 (repealed)	4 Geo. 3. c. 92	19 April 1764
An Act for the better paving of the Streets and Lanes, and for preventing Nuisances and other Annoyances, in that Part of the Parish of Portsea, in the County of Southampton, commonly called Portsmouth Common. (Repealed by Portsea Improvement Act 1792 (32 Geo. 3. c. 103))
Knaresborough (Water Supply) Act 1764	4 Geo. 3. c. 93	19 April 1764
An Act for the better supplying the Town of Knaresborough, and that Part of the Township of Scriven with Tenter Gate adjoining upon the said Town, with Water.

=== Private acts ===
Short title	Citation	Royal assent
Long title
Heckington Inclosure Act 1764	4 Geo. 3. c. 5 Pr.	21 March 1764
An Act for dividing and enclosing the Open and Common Fields, Common Meadows, and other Commonable Lands, in the Parish of Heckington, in the County of Lincoln.
Guilsborough, Coton, and Nortoft (Northamptonshire) Inclosure Act 1764	4 Geo. 3. c. 6 Pr.	21 March 1764
An Act for dividing and enclosing the Open and Common Fields, Common Meadows, Common Grounds, Heath Grounds, Lanes, and Waste Ground, within Guilsborough, Coton, and Nortoft, in the County of Northampton.
Stainton in the Hole Inclosure Act 1764	4 Geo. 3. c. 7 Pr.	21 March 1764
An Act for dividing and enclosing certain Open Common Fields and Grounds in the Manor and Parish of Stainton in the Hole, in the County of Lincoln.
Searby Inclosure Act 1764	4 Geo. 3. c. 8 Pr.	21 March 1764
An Act for dividing and enclosing the Common Fields, Common and Waste Grounds, in the Parish of Searby, in the County of Lincoln.
Chilver's Coton (Warwickshire) Inclosure Act 1764	4 Geo. 3. c. 9 Pr.	21 March 1764
An Act for dividing and enclosing the Open and Common Fields, and Commons or Waste Grounds, in the Parish of Chilvers Coton, in the County of Warwick.
North Tuddenham or St. Clares, Mattishall Tuddenham, and Bell-house Hall (Norfolk) Inclosure Act 1764	4 Geo. 3. c. 10 Pr.	21 March 1764
An Act for enclosing and dividing so much of the Moor, or Common, called Badley Moor, as lies within the Manors of North Tuddenham alias Saint Clares, Mattishall Tuddenham, on the Part of North Tuddenham and Bell-house Hall, and in the Parish of North Tuddenham, in the County of Norfolk, and certain other Commons and Wastes within the said Manors and Parish.
Horbling (Lincolnshire) Inclosure and Drainage Act 1764	4 Geo. 3. c. 11 Pr.	21 March 1764
An Act for dividing and enclosing the Open and Common Fields, Meadows, and Common Fen, in the Parish of Horbling, in the County of Lincoln; and for draining and improving the said Fen.
Billesdon Inclosure Act 1764	4 Geo. 3. c. 12 Pr.	21 March 1764
An Act for dividing and enclosing the Open Fields and Commonable Places of and in Billesdon, in the County of Leicester.
Sudcoates Inclosure Act 1764	4 Geo. 3. c. 13 Pr.	21 March 1764
An Act for establishing and confirming the Enclosure and Division of certain Lands in Sudcoates, in the Parish of Drypool, in the County of York; and for other Purposes.
St. Margaret near Leicester Inclosure Act 1764 (repealed)	4 Geo. 3. c. 14 Pr.	21 March 1764
An Act for dividing and enclosing several Common and Open Fields and Meadows in the Parish of Saint Margaret; near the Borough of Leicester, in the County of Leicester. (Repealed by Leicestershire Act 1985 (c. xvii))
Wartnaby Inclosure Act 1764	4 Geo. 3. c. 15 Pr.	21 March 1764
An Act for dividing and enclosing the Open and Common Fields of Wartnaby, in the County of Leicester, and all the Lands and Grounds within the same Fields.
North Cave Inclosure Act 1764	4 Geo. 3. c. 16 Pr.	21 March 1764
An Act for dividing and enclosing the Open and Common Fields, Meadows, and Pastures, of North Cave, in the East Riding of the County of York.
Skipsea Inclosure Act 1764	4 Geo. 3. c. 17 Pr.	21 March 1764
An Act for confirming Articles of Agreement, for enclosing and dividing several Open Fields, and several Pieces or Parcels of Arable, Meadow, and Pasture Ground, within the Township of Skipsea, in the County of York.
Skeffling Inclosure Act 1764	4 Geo. 3. c. 18 Pr.	21 March 1764
An Act for dividing and enclosing the Open and Common Fields and Grounds in the Township and Parish of Skeffling in Holderness, in the County of York.
Bromley Inclosure Act 1764	4 Geo. 3. c. 19 Pr.	21 March 1764
An Act for extinguishing the Right of Common in, over, and upon, certain Commonable Lands and Grounds within the Manor and Parish of Bromley, in the County of Kent.
Exempting Batchacre Grange (Staffordshire, Salop) from payment of tithes and ecclesiastical dues and settling other tithes in lieu thereof.	4 Geo. 3. c. 20 Pr.	21 March 1764
An Act for exempting Batchacre Grange, in the Counties of Stafford and Salop, or One of them, from Payment of Tithes and other Ecclesiastical Dues; and for settling other Tithes in Lieu thereof.
Helgay (Norfolk) Drainage Act 1764	4 Geo. 3. c. 21 Pr.	21 March 1764
An Act for draining certain Fen Lands and Wet Grounds in the Parish of Helgay, in the County of Norfolk.
Thorngumbald (Yorkshire) Drainage Act 1764	4 Geo. 3. c. 22 Pr.	21 March 1764
An Act for draining and preserving certain Marsh Lands and Low Grounds within the Township of Thorngumbald, in the County of York.
Bland's Estate Act 1764	4 Geo. 3. c. 23 Pr.	21 March 1764
An Act for establishing and carrying into Execution certain Articles of Agreement therein mentioned, for a Division of certain Real Estates, in the County of York, late of Sir Hungerford Bland Baronet, deceased; and for other Purposes therein mentioned.
Newport's Estate Act 1764	4 Geo. 3. c. 24 Pr.	21 March 1764
An Act for empowering the Committee or Committees, for the Time being, of the Estate of John Newport Esquire, a Lunatick, to make Leases of his Estates during his Lunacy.
Executing an agreement between the hospital for the Maintenance and Education of Exposed and Deserted Young Children and Robert Needham, concerning an estate in Jamaica devised by Henry Needham's will.	4 Geo. 3. c. 25 Pr.	21 March 1764
An Act for carrying into Execution an Agreement between the Governors and Guardians of the Hospital for the Maintenance and Education of Exposed and Deserted Young Children, and Robert Nedham Esquire, deceased, relating to an Estate in the Island of Jamaica, devised by the Will of Henry Nedham Esquire, deceased.
All Souls' College Oxford and East Lockinge Rectory Annexation Act 1764	4 Geo. 3. c. 26 Pr.	21 March 1764
An Act for annexing the Rectory of East Lockinge, in the County of Berks, to the Office of Warden of the College of The Souls of All faithful People deceased, of Oxford.
Tregenna's Estates Act 1764	4 Geo. 3. c. 27 Pr.	21 March 1764
An Act for Sale of the Freehold and Leasehold Estates of John Tregenna Clerk, deceased, in the County of Cornwall, given and devised by his Will, in Trust, for his Children; and for paying and applying the Money to arise by such Sale in Manner therein mentioned.
Rochdale (Lancashire) Vicarage Glebe Lands Act 1764 (repealed)	4 Geo. 3. c. 28 Pr.	21 March 1764
An Act to enable the Vicar of the Parish of Rochdale, in the County of Lancaster, to grant a Lease or Leases of the Glebe Lands belonging to the said Vicarage. (Repealed by Rochdale Vicarage Act 1866 (29 & 30 Vict. c. 86))
Bury (Lancashire) Rectory Glebe Lands Act 1764	4 Geo. 3. c. 29 Pr.	21 March 1764
An Act to enable the Rector of the Parish and Parish Church of Bury, in the County of Lancaster, for the Time being, to grant Leases of the Glebe belonging to the said Rectory.
Making the exemplification of Thomas King's will evidence in all British and Irish courts.	4 Geo. 3. c. 30 Pr.	21 March 1764
An Act for making the Exemplification of the Will of Thomas King Esquire, deceased, Evidence in all Courts of Law and Equity in Great Britain and Ireland.
Peers' Name Act 1764	4 Geo. 3. c. 31 Pr.	21 March 1764
An Act to enable Richard Symons, an Infant (lately called Richard Peers), and the Heirs of his Body, to take and use the Surname of Symons, pursuant to the Will of Richard Symons Esquire, deceased.
Naturalization of William Dingman and John Reincke.	4 Geo. 3. c. 32 Pr.	21 March 1764
An Act for naturalizing William Dingman and John Reincke.
Naturalization of John Marteilhe.	4 Geo. 3. c. 33 Pr.	21 March 1764
An Act for naturalizing John Martelihe of London Merchant.
Naturalization of Egbert Nonnen.	4 Geo. 3. c. 34 Pr.	21 March 1764
An Act for naturalizing Egbert Nonnen.
Sharnford (Leicestershire) Inclosure Act 1764	4 Geo. 3. c. 35 Pr.	5 April 1764
An Act for dividing and enclosing the Common and Open Fields and Commonable Places of Sharnford, in the County of Leicester.
Whetstone (Leicestershire) Inclosure Act 1764	4 Geo. 3. c. 36 Pr.	5 April 1764
An Act for dividing and enclosing the Open and Common Fields, Common Pastures, Common Meadows, and other Commonable Lands and Grounds, in Whetstone, in the County of Leicester.
Fotherby (Lincolnshire) Inclosure Act 1764	4 Geo. 3. c. 37 Pr.	5 April 1764
An Act for dividing and enclosing the Open and Common Fields, Common Meadows, Lammas Grounds, and other Commonable Lands and Grounds, in the Parish of Fotherby, in the County of Lincoln.
Stoney Stanton and Potters Marston (Leicestershire) Inclosure Act 1764	4 Geo. 3. c. 38 Pr.	5 April 1764
An Act for dividing and enclosing the Open Fields and Commonable Places in the Parish of Stoney Stanton, in the County of Leicester, and the Lands, Meadows, and Commonable Places, in the Lordship of Potters Marston, in the said County, belonging to, and used with, the said Fields of Stoney Stanton.
Aldborough Inclosure Act 1764	4 Geo. 3. c. 39 Pr.	5 April 1764
An Act for dividing, allotting, and enclosing, the Open Fields and Pasture Ground in the Lordship of Aldbrough in Holderness, in the County of York.
Houghton in the Marsh or Holton in the Clay (Lincolnshire) Inclosure Act 1764	4 Geo. 3. c. 40 Pr.	5 April 1764
An Act for dividing and enclosing the several Open and Common Fields, and Ings, within the Township and Parish of Houghton in the Marsh, otherwise Holton in the Clay, in the County of Lincoln.
Stoke Albany Inclosure Act 1764	4 Geo. 3. c. 41 Pr.	5 April 1764
An Act for dividing and enclosing the Open and Common Fields lying in the Manor and Parish of Stoke Albany, in the County of Northampton.
Newnham Inclosure Act 1764	4 Geo. 3. c. 42 Pr.	5 April 1764
An Act for dividing and enclosing the Common Fields, Common Pastures, Common Meadows, Common Grounds, and Waste Grounds, of and in the Manor and Parish of Newnham, in the County of Northampton.
Everdon Inclosure Act 1764	4 Geo. 3. c. 43 Pr.	5 April 1764
An Act for dividing and enclosing the Common Fields, Common Pastures, Common Meadows, Common Grounds, and Waste Grounds, of and in the Manor and Parish of Everdon, otherwise Great Everdon, and Little Everdon, in the County of Northampton.
Ledgers Ashby Inclosure Act 1764	4 Geo. 3. c. 44 Pr.	5 April 1764
An Act for enclosing and dividing the Common Fields, Common Pastures, Common Grounds, and Waste Grounds, in the Parish of Ledgers Ashby, in the County of Northampton.
Crook and Billyrow (Durham) Inclosure Act 1764	4 Geo. 3. c. 45 Pr.	5 April 1764
An Act for dividing and enclosing a certain Moor, or Common, in the Township of Crook and Billyrow, within the Parish of Brancepeth, in the County of Durham.
Atherstone Inclosure Act 1764	4 Geo. 3. c. 46 Pr.	5 April 1764
An Act for dividing and enclosing the Open and Common Fields of Atherstone, in the County of Warwick, and all the Lands, Meadows, and Grounds, within the same.
Holderness Drainage Act 1764	4 Geo. 3. c. 47 Pr.	5 April 1764
An Act for draining, preserving, and improving, the Low Grounds and Carrs lying and being in the Parishes, Townships, Hamlets, Lordships, Precincts, and Territories, of Sutton, Ganstead, Swine, Benningholme, Benningholme Grange, and Fairholme, North Skirlaugh, Rowton, Arnold, Long Riston, Leven Heigholme, and Hallytree-Holme, Brandes-Burton, and Bursall, Eske, Tickton, Weel, Routh, Meaux, and Waghen otherwise Wawn, in Holderness, in the East Riding of the County of York.
John Viscount Spencer's Estate Act 1764	4 Geo. 3. c. 48 Pr.	5 April 1764
An Act to empower the Right Honourable John Lord Viscount Spencer to make Leases of the Manor of Battersea and Wandsworth, and of Lands and Grounds in Battersea and Wandsworth, in the County of Surrey, purchased in Pursuance of the Will of the most Noble Sarab late Dutches Dowager of Marlborough, in order for building upon and improving the same.
Horton's Estates Act 1764	4 Geo. 3. c. 49 Pr.	5 April 1764
An Act for confirming a Partition of several Estates, late of Thomas Horton, in the Counties of Wilts and Gloucester, between William Blanch, John Roberts, Richard Brereton, and others; and for vesting and settling the Premises to the several Uses therein mentioned.
Beagham's Estate Act 1764	4 Geo. 3. c. 50 Pr.	5 April 1764
An Act for vesting the Estate late of Edmund Hungate Beaghan Esquire, deceased, in the Counties of Kent and Sussex, in Trustees, in Trust, to sell and convey the same to Edward Louisa Mann Esquire, or as he shall appoint, pursuant to an Agreement for that Purpose; and for applying the Money arising by such Sale for the Benefit of George Edmund Beaghan, his only Son and Heir, an Infant.
Brett's Estate Act 1764	4 Geo. 3. c. 51 Pr.	5 April 1764
An Act for vesting divers Messuages and Hereditaments in the City of London, the settled Estate of Elizabeth Brett, Wife of Charles Brett Esquire, in the said Charles Brett and his Heirs, discharged from the Uses of his Marriage Settlement; and for settling another Estate, in the County of Middlesex, of greater Value, in Lieu thereof, to the Uses limited of the said Estate.
Discharging uses and trusts of lands and manors in Norfolk, settled for benefit of William Wigget and Mary Bullwer and settling others in the same county.	4 Geo. 3. c. 52 Pr.	5 April 1764
An Act for discharging the Uses and Trusts of certain Manors, Lands, and Hereditaments, in the County of Norfolk, settled upon, and for the Benefit of, William Wiggett Bulwer and Mary his Wife, and their Issue; and for substituting and settling other Estates and Hereditaments in the same County, of greater Value, in Lieu thereof, to the like Uses.
Delaune's Estate Act 1764	4 Geo. 3. c. 53 Pr.	5 April 1764
An Act for vesting Two Shares in Ranelagh House, Gardens, and Premises, late the Estate of James Delaune, deceased, in John Ferrett and Robert Edmeston, and their Heirs, in Trust, to sell the same, and apply the Money arising from such Sale to the several Charitable Purposes as directed by the Will of the said James Delaune.
Young's Estate Act 1764	4 Geo. 3. c. 54 Pr.	5 April 1764
An Act for vesting the settled Estate of William Young Esquire, in the County of Wilts, in Trustees, to be sold; and for laying out the Money arising thereby, together with other Money of the said William Young, in the Purchase of other Hereditaments, of greater Value, to be settled in Lieu thereof.
John Carter's Name Act 1764	4 Geo. 3. c. 55 Pr.	5 April 1764
An Act to enable John Pollard Esquire (lately called John Carter) and his Heirs Male to take and use the Surname and Arms of Pollard, pursuant to the Will of Elizabeth Pollard, deceased.
Naturalization of James de Berville, Johann Uckermann and John Hauser.	4 Geo. 3. c. 56 Pr.	5 April 1764
An Act for naturalizing James Nehou de Berville, Johann Jacob Uckermann, and John Hauser.
Naturalization of James Alric.	4 Geo. 3. c. 57 Pr.	5 April 1764
An Act for naturalizing James Alric.
West Haddon (Northamptonshire) Inclosure Act 1764	4 Geo. 3. c. 58 Pr.	19 April 1764
An Act for dividing and enclosing the Open and Common Fields, Common Pastures, Common Meadows, Common Grounds, Heath, and Waste Ground, in the Manor and Parish of West Haddon, in the County of Northampton.
Newport (Salop.) Inclosure Act 1764 (repealed)	4 Geo. 3. c. 59 Pr.	19 April 1764
An Act for dividing and enclosing a Waste Ground called The Marsh, in the Township of Newport, in the County of Salop; and applying the Produce thereof to the several Purposes therein mentioned. (Repealed by Newport (Salop.) Marsh Improvement Act 1854 (17 & 18 Vict. c. lxxxi))
Enabling Lucy Knightly to make inclosures in Haversham (Buckinghamshire), vesting in him certain glebe lands and tithes belonging to Haversham rectory and compensating the rector for the same.	4 Geo. 3. c. 60 Pr.	19 April 1764
An Act to enable Lucy Knightley Esquire to enclose several Open and Common Fields in the Parish of Haversham, in the County of Bucks; and for vesting certain Glebe Lands, and the Tithes belonging to the Rectory of Haversham aforesaid in the said Lucy Knightley and his Heirs; and for making a Compensation to the Rector of the said Parish, in Lieu thereof.
Westbury Inclosure Act 1764	4 Geo. 3. c. 61 Pr.	19 April 1764
An Act for dividing and enclosing the Open and Common Field, Common Meadows, Common Pastures, Common Grounds, and Commonable Lands, within the Manor, Parish, and Liberties of Westbury, in the County of Buckingham.
Nether Broughton Inclosure Act 1764	4 Geo. 3. c. 62 Pr.	19 April 1764
An Act for dividing and enclosing the Common Fields, Common Meadows, and Common Pastures, in the Parish of Nether Broughton, in the County of Leicester.
Staindrop Inclosure Act 1764	4 Geo. 3. c. 63 Pr.	19 April 1764
An Act for dividing and enclosing a Moor, or Common, called Staindrop Moor, within the Township of Staindrop, in the County of Durham.
Great Wigston Inclosure Act 1764	4 Geo. 3. c. 64 Pr.	19 April 1764
An Act for dividing and enclosing the Open and Common Fields in the Parish of Great Wigston, in the County of Leicester.
Husbands Boswoth or Boresworth (Leicestershire) Inclosure Act 1764	4 Geo. 3. c. 65 Pr.	19 April 1764
An Act for dividing and enclosing the Open and Common Fields, Common Pastures, Common Meadows, Common Grounds, and Waste Grounds, in the Parish of Husbands Bosworth, otherwise Boresworth, in the County of Leicester.
Wombwell Inclosure Act 1764	4 Geo. 3. c. 66 Pr.	19 April 1764
An Act for dividing and enclosing the Common or Waste Grounds within the Manor of Wombwell, in the County of York.
Warkworth Inclosure Act 1764	4 Geo. 3. c. 67 Pr.	19 April 1764
An Act for dividing and enclosing the Open and Common Field, Common Meadows, Common Pastures, Common Grounds, and Commonable Lands, lying within the Township, Hamlets, and Liberties, of Warkworth, in the County of Northampton.
Earl of Ashburnham's Estate Act 1764	4 Geo. 3. c. 68 Pr.	19 April 1764
An Act for vesting divers Manors, Lands, and Hereditaments, in the Counties of Bedford, Dorset, and Lancaster, comprised in the Marriage Settlement of John Earl of Ashburnham, in him the said Earl, in Fee Simple, discharged of the Uses and Trusts of that Settlement; and for substituting and settling other Lands and Hereditaments, in the Dominion of Wales, in Lieu thereof, and to the like Uses.
Earl of Egremont's Estate Act 1764	4 Geo. 3. c. 69 Pr.	19 April 1764
An Act to empower the Guardians of George Earl of Egremont, an Infant, to enfranchise certain Customary Lands and Hereditaments, in the County of Cumberland, Part of the settled Estates of the said Earl; and also to empower the Guardians of the said Earl and his Infant Brothers to make Leases of Part of the said Estates in the County of Cumberland; and to make Leases and Copyhold Grants of the several Estates limited and devised to them respectively by Charles Earl of Egremont, their late Father, deceased; and for other the Purposes therein mentioned.
Earl of Barymore's Estate Act 1764	4 Geo. 3. c. 70 Pr.	19 April 1764
An Act for vesting Lands and Hereditaments in Great Britain and Ireland, Part of the Estate of James Earl of Barrymore, in Trustees, for raising Money towards paying and discharging the Debts and Encumbrances affecting his Real Estates.
Henrietta Rosa Peregrina Townsend's Estate Act 1764	4 Geo. 3. c. 71 Pr.	19 April 1764
An Act for settling the Estate of Henrietta Rosa Peregrina Townsend, Wife of James Townsend Esquire, according to certain Articles of Agreement executed before her Intermarriage with the said James Townsend, but subject to the Charges and Encumbrances affecting the same.
Harpur Trust Act 1764 (repealed)	4 Geo. 3. c. 72 Pr.	19 April 1764
An Act for enlarging the charitable Uses, extending the Objects, and regulating the Application of the Rents and Profits, of the Estates given by Sir William Harpur Knight and Dame Alice his Wife, for the Benefit of the Poor, and other Objects of Charity, of the Town of Bedford. (Repealed by Bedford School Act 1826 (7 Geo. 4. c. 29 Pr.))
Christ's College Manchester Glebe Lands Act 1764	4 Geo. 3. c. 73 Pr.	19 April 1764
An Act to enable the Warden and Fellows of the College of Christ in Manchester, in the County Palatine of Lancaster, for the Time being, to grant Leases of the Glebe belonging to the said College.
Empowering George Lane Parker to shut up a road used over certain inclosed lands in Gamlingay (Cambridgeshire) and extinguishing all right to a toll to which he is entitled in two lanes near the road and obliging him to keep them in good repair.	4 Geo. 3. c. 74 Pr.	19 April 1764
An Act to empower the Honourable George Lane Parker to shut up a Road or Way now used, over certain enclosed Lands, in the Parish of Gamlingay, in the County of Cambridge; and for extinguishing all Right to a certain Toll which he is now entitled to, in Two Lanes near the said Road or Way; and for obliging him to keep the said Lanes in Repair.
Plunkett's Estate Act 1764	4 Geo. 3. c. 75 Pr.	19 April 1764
An Act for enlarging the Time given to Trustees therein named, to execute certain Trusts vested in them in and by an Act of Parliament made in the Sixteenth Year of the Reign of His late Majesty, intituled, "An Act for vesting the Remainder in Fee of several Lands in Ireland, the Estate of Arthur Plunkett Esquire, in Trustees, in order to sell such Lands to Protestant Purchasers;" (Note: Plunkett's Estate Act 1742 (16 Geo. 2. c. 21 Pr.)) and also by another Act of Parliament made in the Thirty-second Year of the Reign of His said late Majesty, intituled, "An Act for giving further Time to Trustees therein named, to execute certain Trusts vested in them in and by the said Act of Parliament made in the said Sixteenth Year of the Reign of His said late Majesty." (Note: Plunkett's Estate Act 1758 (32 Geo. 2. c. 40 Pr.))
Divesting out of the crown, the reversion in fee of papist Mathew Dowdall's estate in Ireland, expectant of the death of his three grandsons without issue male and vesting the same in Anthony Ladeveze, a Protestant.	4 Geo. 3. c. 76 Pr.	19 April 1764
An Act for divesting out of the Crown the Reversion in Fee of certain Lands in Ireland, late the Estate of Mathew Dowdall, a Papist, deceased, expectant upon the Death of his Three Grandsons without Issue Male and for vesting the same in Anthony Ladeveze of the City of Dublin Esquire, a Protestant, and his Heirs.
Divesting out of the crown the reversion in fee of lands in Ireland and vesting in Gerald Fitzgerald.	4 Geo. 3. c. 77 Pr.	19 April 1764
An Act for divesting out of the Crown, and to vest in Gerald Fitzgerald of Rathrone in the County of Meath in the Kingdom of Ireland Esquire, and his Heirs, the Reversion in Fee of and in several Lands in Ireland.
Enabling the exchange of lands in Saffron Waldon (Essex) between Sir John Griffin Griffin and the trustees of King Edward VI's almshouses there and Thomas Fuller.	4 Geo. 3. c. 78 Pr.	19 April 1764
An Act to enable the Mayor and Aldermen of the Town of Saffron Walden, in the County of Essex, the Guardians or Trustees of King Edward the Sixth's Almshouses there, and other the Feoffees thereof, to convey Part of the Lands, Revenues, and Possessions, of the said Almshouses, to Sir John Griffin Griffin, in Exchange for other Lands, of greater Value, to be conveyed to and held by them, to the Uses and upon the Trusts therein mentioned; and for vesting Part of the Lands of Thomas Fuller, an Infant in Saffron Walden aforesaid, in the said Sir John Griffin Griffin, in Exchange for other Lands, of greater Value, to be conveyed to the said Infant and his Heirs; and for other Purposes therein mentioned.
Bayly's Estate Act 1764	4 Geo. 3. c. 79 Pr.	19 April 1764
An Act for vesting certain Messuages, Lands, Tenements, and Hereditaments, in the Town and County of Northampton, devised by the Will of Edward Bayly, deceased, in Trustees, to be sold; and for laying out the Money arising by such Sale in the Purchase of other Lands, to be settled to the like Uses.
Weller Divorce Act 1764	4 Geo. 3. c. 80 Pr.	19 April 1764
An Act to dissolve the Marriage of John Weller Esquire with Charlotte Wilson his now Wife; and to enable him to marry again; and for other Purposes therein mentioned.
Naturalization of Peter Pohlmann and David Godin.	4 Geo. 3. c. 81 Pr.	19 April 1764
An Act for naturalizing Peter Polhmann and David Godin.
Kock's Naturalization Act 1764	4 Geo. 3. c. 82 Pr.	19 April 1764
An Act for naturalizing Henry Kock.
Poittier's Naturalization Act 1764	4 Geo. 3. c. 83 Pr.	19 April 1764
An Act for naturalizing Alexander Joseph Poittier.

=== Sources ===
- "4 George III - 1763-4". The Statutes at Large. Vol. 26. 1762 – via Internet Archive.
- Journals of the House of Commons. Vol. 29. London: His Majesty's Stationery Office. 1803. pp. 667–1058 – via Google Books.
- Chronological Table of and Index to the Statutes. Vol. 1: To the End of the Session 59 Vict. Sess. 2 (1895) (13th ed.). London: Her Majesty's Stationery Office. 1896. pp. 121–122 – via Google Books.

== See also ==
- List of acts of the Parliament of Great Britain
