= List of acts of the Parliament of Great Britain =

This is a list of acts of the Parliament of Great Britain, which was in existence from 1707 to 1800 (inclusive).

- List of acts of the Parliament of Great Britain from 1707
- List of acts of the Parliament of Great Britain from 1708
- List of acts of the Parliament of Great Britain from 1709

- List of acts of the Parliament of Great Britain from 1710
- List of acts of the Parliament of Great Britain from 1711
- List of acts of the Parliament of Great Britain from 1712
- List of acts of the Parliament of Great Britain from 1713
- List of acts of the Parliament of Great Britain from 1714
- List of acts of the Parliament of Great Britain from 1715
- List of acts of the Parliament of Great Britain from 1716
- List of acts of the Parliament of Great Britain from 1717
- List of acts of the Parliament of Great Britain from 1718
- List of acts of the Parliament of Great Britain from 1719

- List of acts of the Parliament of Great Britain from 1720
- List of acts of the Parliament of Great Britain from 1721
- List of acts of the Parliament of Great Britain from 1722
- List of acts of the Parliament of Great Britain from 1723
- List of acts of the Parliament of Great Britain from 1724
- List of acts of the Parliament of Great Britain from 1725
- List of acts of the Parliament of Great Britain from 1726
- List of acts of the Parliament of Great Britain from 1727
- List of acts of the Parliament of Great Britain from 1728
- List of acts of the Parliament of Great Britain from 1729

- List of acts of the Parliament of Great Britain from 1730
- List of acts of the Parliament of Great Britain from 1731
- List of acts of the Parliament of Great Britain from 1732
- List of acts of the Parliament of Great Britain from 1733
- List of acts of the Parliament of Great Britain from 1734
- List of acts of the Parliament of Great Britain from 1735
- List of acts of the Parliament of Great Britain from 1736
- List of acts of the Parliament of Great Britain from 1737
- List of acts of the Parliament of Great Britain from 1738
- List of acts of the Parliament of Great Britain from 1739

- List of acts of the Parliament of Great Britain from 1740
- List of acts of the Parliament of Great Britain from 1741
- List of acts of the Parliament of Great Britain from 1742
- List of acts of the Parliament of Great Britain from 1743
- List of acts of the Parliament of Great Britain from 1744
- List of acts of the Parliament of Great Britain from 1745
- List of acts of the Parliament of Great Britain from 1746
- List of acts of the Parliament of Great Britain from 1747
- List of acts of the Parliament of Great Britain from 1748
- List of acts of the Parliament of Great Britain from 1749

- List of acts of the Parliament of Great Britain from 1750
- List of acts of the Parliament of Great Britain from 1751
- List of acts of the Parliament of Great Britain from 1753
- List of acts of the Parliament of Great Britain from 1754
- List of acts of the Parliament of Great Britain from 1755
- List of acts of the Parliament of Great Britain from 1756
- List of acts of the Parliament of Great Britain from 1757
- List of acts of the Parliament of Great Britain from 1758
- List of acts of the Parliament of Great Britain from 1759

- List of acts of the Parliament of Great Britain from 1760
- List of acts of the Parliament of Great Britain from 1761
- List of acts of the Parliament of Great Britain from 1762
- List of acts of the Parliament of Great Britain from 1763
- List of acts of the Parliament of Great Britain from 1764
- List of acts of the Parliament of Great Britain from 1765
- List of acts of the Parliament of Great Britain from 1766
- List of acts of the Parliament of Great Britain from 1767
- List of acts of the Parliament of Great Britain from 1768
- List of acts of the Parliament of Great Britain from 1769

- List of acts of the Parliament of Great Britain from 1770
- List of acts of the Parliament of Great Britain from 1771
- List of acts of the Parliament of Great Britain from 1772
- List of acts of the Parliament of Great Britain from 1773
- List of acts of the Parliament of Great Britain from 1774
- List of acts of the Parliament of Great Britain from 1775
- List of acts of the Parliament of Great Britain from 1776
- List of acts of the Parliament of Great Britain from 1777
- List of acts of the Parliament of Great Britain from 1778
- List of acts of the Parliament of Great Britain from 1779

- List of acts of the Parliament of Great Britain from 1780
- List of acts of the Parliament of Great Britain from 1781
- List of acts of the Parliament of Great Britain from 1782
- List of acts of the Parliament of Great Britain from 1783
- List of acts of the Parliament of Great Britain from 1784
- List of acts of the Parliament of Great Britain from 1785
- List of acts of the Parliament of Great Britain from 1786
- List of acts of the Parliament of Great Britain from 1787
- List of acts of the Parliament of Great Britain from 1788
- List of acts of the Parliament of Great Britain from 1789

- List of acts of the Parliament of Great Britain from 1790
- List of acts of the Parliament of Great Britain from 1791
- List of acts of the Parliament of Great Britain from 1792
- List of acts of the Parliament of Great Britain from 1793
- List of acts of the Parliament of Great Britain from 1794
- List of acts of the Parliament of Great Britain from 1795
- List of acts of the Parliament of Great Britain from 1796
- List of acts of the Parliament of Great Britain from 1797
- List of acts of the Parliament of Great Britain from 1798
- List of acts of the Parliament of Great Britain from 1799

- List of acts of the Parliament of Great Britain from 1800

== See also ==
For acts passed up until the Act of Union 1707:

- List of acts of the Parliament of England
- List of acts of the Parliament of Scotland
- List of acts of the Parliament of Ireland

For acts passed from 1801 onwards:

- List of acts of the Parliament of the United Kingdom

For acts of the modern devolved parliaments and assemblies in the United Kingdom:

- List of acts of the Scottish Parliament
- List of acts of the Northern Ireland Assembly
- List of acts and measures of Senedd Cymru
- List of acts of the Parliament of Northern Ireland

For legal literature:

- Chronological Table of Local Legislation
- Chronological Table of Private and Personal Acts
