= List of acts of the Parliament of Great Britain from 1761 =

This is a complete list of acts of the Parliament of Great Britain for the year 1761.

For acts passed until 1707, see the list of acts of the Parliament of England and the list of acts of the Parliament of Scotland. See also the list of acts of the Parliament of Ireland.

For acts passed from 1801 onwards, see the list of acts of the Parliament of the United Kingdom. For acts of the devolved parliaments and assemblies in the United Kingdom, see the list of acts of the Scottish Parliament, the list of acts of the Northern Ireland Assembly, and the list of acts and measures of Senedd Cymru; see also the list of acts of the Parliament of Northern Ireland.

The number shown after each act's title is its chapter number. Acts are cited using this number, preceded by the year(s) of the reign during which the relevant parliamentary session was held; thus the Union with Ireland Act 1800 is cited as "39 & 40 Geo. 3. c. 67", meaning the 67th act passed during the session that started in the 39th year of the reign of George III and which finished in the 40th year of that reign. Note that the modern convention is to use Arabic numerals in citations (thus "41 Geo. 3" rather than "41 Geo. III"). Acts of the last session of the Parliament of Great Britain and the first session of the Parliament of the United Kingdom are both cited as "41 Geo. 3".

Acts passed by the Parliament of Great Britain did not have a short title; however, some of these acts have subsequently been given a short title by acts of the Parliament of the United Kingdom (such as the Short Titles Act 1896).

Before the Acts of Parliament (Commencement) Act 1793 came into force on 8 April 1793, acts passed by the Parliament of Great Britain were deemed to have come into effect on the first day of the session in which they were passed. Because of this, the years given in the list below may in fact be the year before a particular act was passed.

== 2 Geo. 3 ==
The first session of the 12th Parliament of Great Britain, which met from 3 November 1761 until 2 June 1762.

This session was also traditionally cited as 2 G. 3.

=== Public acts ===
Short title	Citation	Royal assent
Long title
Provision for the Queen Act 1761 (repealed)	2 Geo. 3. c. 1	2 December 1761
An Act for enabling His Majesty to make Provision for supporting the Royal Dignity of the Queen, in case She shall survive His Majesty. (Repealed by Statute Law Revision Act 1867 (30 & 31 Vict. c. 59))
Insolvent Debtors Relief Act 1761 (repealed)	2 Geo. 3. c. 2	4 December 1761
An Act to repeal so much of an Act, passed in the First Year of His present Majesty King George the Third, intituled, "An Act for Relief of Insolvent Debtors," (Note: Insolvent Debtors Relief Act 1760 (1 Geo. 3. c. 17)) as relates to Creditors compelling Prisoners to deliver up their Estates, and to such Prisoners being thereupon discharged. (Repealed by Statute Law Revision Act 1867 (30 & 31 Vict. c. 59))
Land Tax Act 1761 (repealed)	2 Geo. 3. c. 3	4 December 1761
An Act for granting an Aid to His Majesty, by a Land Tax, to be raised in Great Britain, for the Service of the Year One Thousand Seven Hundred and Sixty-two. (Repealed by Statute Law Revision Act 1867 (30 & 31 Vict. c. 59))
Malt Duties etc. Act 1761 (repealed)	2 Geo. 3. c. 4	4 December 1761
An Act for continuing, and granting to His Majesty, certain Duties upon Malt, Mum, Cyder, and Perry, for the Service of the Year One Thousand Seven Hundred and Sixty-two. (Repealed by Statute Law Revision Act 1867 (30 & 31 Vict. c. 59))
Taxation, etc. Act 1761 (repealed)	2 Geo. 3. c. 5	23 December 1761
An Act for more effectually preventing the excessive Use of Spirituous Liquors for Home Consumption, by laying additional Duties upon Spirits made in Great Britain, or imported into the same; and for better regulating and encouraging the Exportation of British-made Spirits; and for securing the Payment of the Duties upon Spirituous Liquors. (Repealed by Statute Law Revision Act 1867 (30 & 31 Vict. c. 59))
Importation Act 1761 (repealed)	2 Geo. 3. c. 6	23 December 1761
An Act for the Importation of Salted Beef, Pork, and Butter, into this Kingdom, from Ireland, for a limited Time, for the Supply of His Majesty's Ships, Transport and other Ships and Vessels in His Majesty's immediate Service and Pay. (Repealed by Statute Law Revision Act 1867 (30 & 31 Vict. c. 59))
Unfunded Debt Act 1761 (repealed)	2 Geo. 3. c. 7	10 February 1762
An Act for enabling His Majesty to raise a certain Sum of Money, towards paying off and discharging the Debt of the Navy, and towards Naval Services, for the Year One Thousand Seven Hundred and Sixty-two. (Repealed by Statute Law Revision Act 1867 (30 & 31 Vict. c. 59))
Window Duties Act 1761 (repealed)	2 Geo. 3. c. 8	10 February 1762
An Act for granting to His Majesty several Rates and Duties upon Windows or Lights. (Repealed by House Tax Act 1803 (43 Geo. 3. c. 161))
National Debt Act 1761 (repealed)	2 Geo. 3. c. 9	10 February 1762
An Act for charging certain Annuities, granted in the Year One Thousand Seven Hundred and Sixty, on the Sinking Fund; and for carrying the Duties therein mentioned to the said Fund; and for making forth Duplicates of Exchequer Bills, Tickets, Certificates, Receipts, Annuity Orders, and other Orders, lost, burnt, or otherwise destroyed. (Repealed by Statute Law Revision Act 1870 (33 & 34 Vict. c. 69))
National Debt (No. 2) Act 1761 (repealed)	2 Geo. 3. c. 10	10 February 1762
An Act for raising by Annuities, in the Manner therein mentioned, the Sum of Twelve Millions, to be charged on the Sinking Fund; and for applying the Surplus of certain Duties on Spirituous Liquors, and also the Monies arising from the Duties on Spirituous Liquors granted by an Act of this Session of Parliament. (Note: Taxation, etc. Act 1761 (2 Geo. 3. c. 5)) (Repealed by Statute Law Revision Act 1870 (33 & 34 Vict. c. 69))
Mutiny Act 1761 (repealed)	2 Geo. 3. c. 11	24 March 1762
An Act for punishing Mutiny and Desertion; and for the better Payment of the Army and their Quarters. (Repealed by Statute Law Revision Act 1867 (30 & 31 Vict. c. 59))
Marine Mutiny Act 1761 (repealed)	2 Geo. 3. c. 12	24 March 1762
An Act for the Regulation of His Majesty's Marine Forces while on Shore. (Repealed by Statute Law Revision Act 1867 (30 & 31 Vict. c. 59))
Land Tax (Commissioners) Act 1761 (repealed)	2 Geo. 3. c. 13	24 March 1762
An Act for appointing Commissioners for putting in Execution an Act of this Session of Parliament, intituled, "An Act for granting an Aid to His Majesty, by a Land Tax, to be raised in Great Britain, for the Service of the Year One Thousand Seven Hundred and Sixty-two." (Note: Land Tax Act 1761 (2 Geo. 3. c. 3)) (Repealed by Statute Law Revision Act 1867 (30 & 31 Vict. c. 59))
Beer Act 1761 (repealed)	2 Geo. 3. c. 14	24 March 1762
An Act to prevent vexatious Proceedings against Brewers, Victualers, and others, with respect to the Prices of Beer and Ale; for better securing the Revenue upon Strong Beer and Ale, by preventing fraudulent mixing thereof; to repeal so much of an Act, made in the First Year of the Reign of His present Majesty, (Note: National Debt Act 1760 (1 Geo. 3. c. 7)) as extends certain Provisions relative to the Exportation of Spirituous Liquors, to the Exportation of Strong Beer and Ale; and for the more effectual preventing the re-landing of Beer, Ale, Cyder, and Mum, shipped for Exportation as Merchandize. (Repealed by Statute Law Revision Act 1867 (30 & 31 Vict. c. 59))

=== Private acts ===
Short title	Citation	Royal assent
Long title
Thornton's Naturalization Act 1761	2 Geo. 3. c. 1 Pr.	4 December 1761
An Act for naturalizing Anna Maria Thornton, Wife of Octavius Thornton Merchant.
Pershore Inclosure Act 1761	2 Geo. 3. c. 2 Pr.	23 December 1761
An Act for dividing and enclosing certain Common Fields and Meadows in the Parish of Holy Cross in Pershore, in the County of Worcester.
Naturalization of Philip Krauter and John Paris Act 1761	2 Geo. 3. c. 3 Pr.	23 December 1761
An Act for naturalizing Philip Jacob Krauter and John Paris.
Berens' Naturalization Act 1761	2 Geo. 3. c. 4 Pr.	23 December 1761
An Act for naturalizing John Berens.

=== Sources ===
- Pickering, Danby, ed. (1763). "Anno secundo Georgii III". The Statutes at Large. Vol. 25. Cambridge: Joseph Bentham. pp. 1–228 – via Internet Archive.
- Pickering, Danby, ed. (1766). "Anno secundo Georgii III". The Statutes at Large. Vol. 25. Cambridge: Joseph Bentham. pp. 1–228 – via Internet Archive.
- Journals of the House of Commons. Vol. 29. London: His Majesty's Stationery Office. 1803. pp. 6–352 – via Google Books.
- Chronological Table of and Index to the Statutes. Vol. 1: To the End of the Session 59 Vict. Sess. 2 (1895) (13th ed.). London: Her Majesty's Stationery Office. 1896. pp. 120–121 – via Google Books.

== See also ==
- List of acts of the Parliament of Great Britain
