= 1723 in Great Britain =

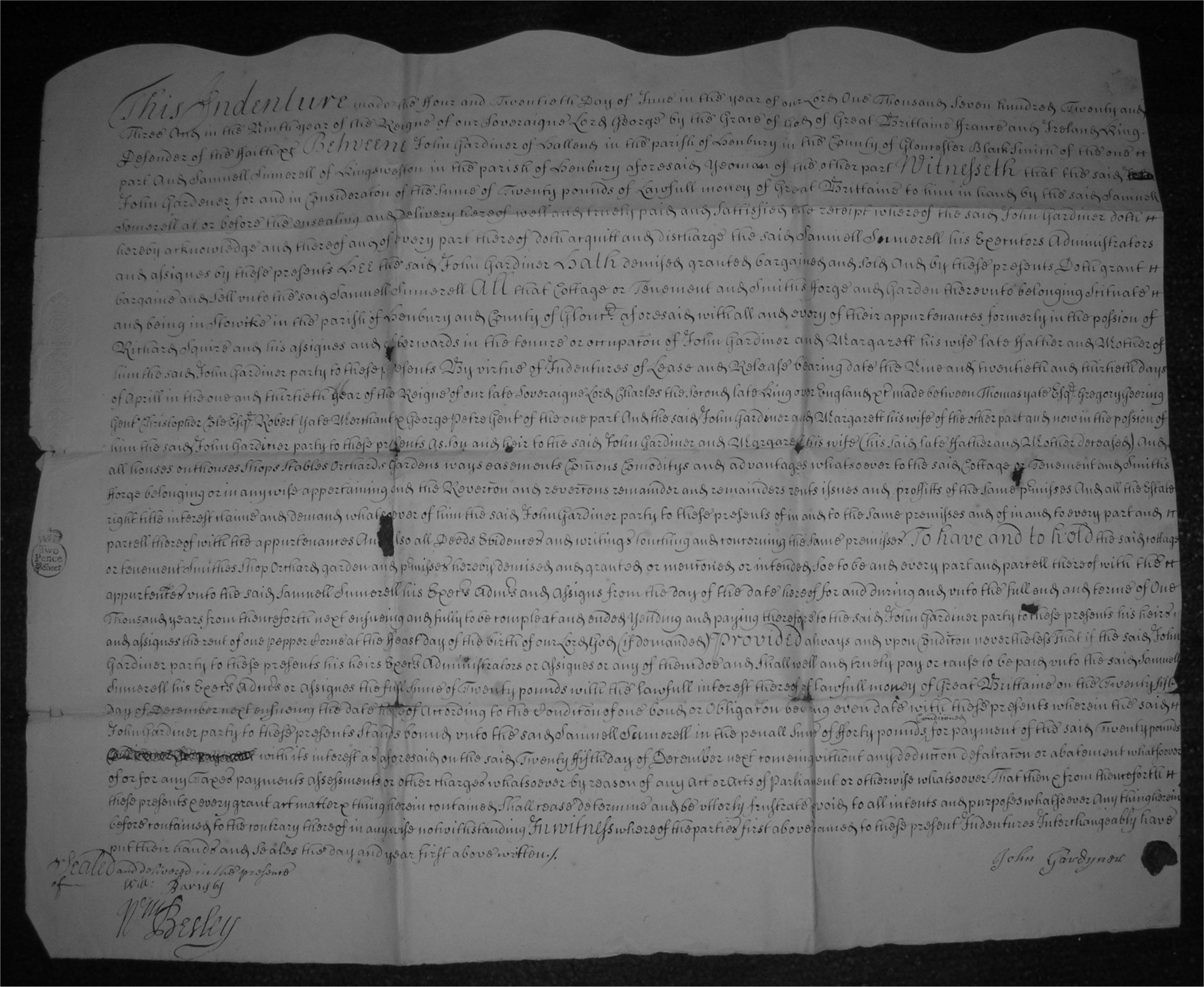
One half of an indenture document dated 24 June 1723, the ninth year of the reign of King George I of Great Britain.

Events from the year 1723 in Great Britain.

== Incumbents ==
- Monarch – George I
- Prime Minister – Robert Walpole (Whig)

== Events ==
- 8 March – the Chelsea Waterworks Company receives a Royal Charter.
- 17 May – Christopher Layer is hanged, drawn and quartered for his part in the Jacobite Atterbury Plot
- May – Parliament passes the Black Act making poaching a capital offence.
- June – Henry St John, 1st Viscount Bolingbroke, receives a pardon for his part in the Jacobite Rebellion and is allowed to return to Britain, but not to sit in the House of Lords. Francis Atterbury, Bishop of Rochester, is banished from the country during the year for his part in Jacobite plotting.
- 10 October – Treaty of Charlottenburg signed with Prussia.

=== Undated ===
- Parliament passes the Workhouse Test Act.

== Births ==
- 23 February – Richard Price, philosopher (died 1791)
- 24 February – John Burgoyne, general (died 1792)
- 3 March – John Brown, merchant and ship-owner (died 1808)
- 5 March – Princess Mary of Great Britain (died 1772)
- 23 April – Hannah Snell, soldier (died 1792)
- 16 June (5 June O.S.) – Adam Smith, Scottish economist and philosopher (died 1790)
- 20 June
  - Adam Ferguson, Scottish philosopher and historian (died 1816)
  - Theophilus Lindsey, theologian (died 1808)
- 10 July – William Blackstone, jurist (died 1780)
- 16 July – Sir Joshua Reynolds, painter (died 1792)
- 8 November – John Byron, admiral (died 1786)

== Deaths ==
- 25 February – Sir Christopher Wren, architect, astronomer and mathematician (born 1632)
- 26 February – Thomas d'Urfey, writer (born 1653)
- 31 March – Edward Hyde, 3rd Earl of Clarendon, Governor of New York and New Jersey (born 1661)
- 11 April – John Robinson, diplomat (born 1650)
- 27 May – Charles Lennox, 1st Duke of Richmond, illegitimate son of Charles II (born 1672)
- 26 July – Robert Bertie, 1st Duke of Ancaster and Kesteven, statesman (born 1660)
- 17 August – Joseph Bingham, scholar (born 1668)
- 10 October – William Cowper, 1st Earl Cowper, Lord Chancellor (born c.1665)
- 19 October – Godfrey Kneller, painter (born 1646, Lübeck)
- 1 December – Susanna Centlivre, dramatist and actress (born 1669)

== See also ==
- 1723 in Wales
