= Taxation Act 1722 =

Act of the Parliament of Great Britain

- Act of Parliament
- Parliament of Great Britain
- Long title: An Act for granting an Aid to His Majesty, by laying a Tax upon Papists; and for making such other Persons as, upon due Summons, shall refuse or neglect to take the Oaths therein mentioned, to contribute towards the said Tax, for reimbursing to the Public Part of the great Expences occasioned by the late Conspiracies; and for discharging the Estates of Papists from Two Third Parts of the Rents and Profits thereof for One Year, and all Arrears of the same; and from such Forfeitures as are therein more particularly described.
- Citation: 9 Geo. 1. c. 18
- Territorial extent: Great Britain

Dates
- Royal assent: 27 May 1723
- Commencement: 9 October 1722 (Note: Start of session.)
- Repealed: 15 July 1867
Other legislation
Repealed by	Statute Law Revision Act 1867
Relates to	Crown Lands (Forfeited Estates) Act 1715; Papists Act 1722

Status: Repealed

Text of statute as originally enacted

The Taxation Act 1722 (9 Geo. 1. c. 18) was an act of the Parliament of Great Britain passed in response to the Jacobite risings and the Atterbury Plot. The act, with the Oaths Act, is known collectively as the Papists Act 1722 (9 Geo. 1. c. 24).

Following the Jacobite rising of 1715, and seeking to curtail the political activity of both Catholics and partisans seeking to restore the Stuart dynasty, the legislature passed multiple bills that varyingly penalized and taxed Catholics, Irish subjects, and other political dissidents. Similar bills passed the parliament throughout the eighteenth century, frequently ratified in waves following similar events of rebellion, most notably the second Jacobite rising of 1745.

The act, also referred to as the "papists tax", was championed by Robert Walpole, 1st Earl of Orford (who is generally regarded as the first Prime Minister of Great Britain). The tax sought to levy £100,000, which was to paid in addition to the double Land Tax already owed by Roman Catholics. The act's sister legislation, the Oaths Act, required a statement from Catholics in support of George I, and further oaths of royal supremacy that compromised the faith of Catholic subjects.

Both acts received royal assent in 1723.

== Subsequent developments ==
The whole act was repealed by section 1 of, and the schedule to, the Statute Law Revision Act 1867 (30 & 31 Vict. c. 59).
