= List of acts of the Parliament of Great Britain from 1723 =

This is a complete list of acts of the Parliament of Great Britain for the year 1723.

For acts passed until 1707, see the list of acts of the Parliament of England and the list of acts of the Parliament of Scotland. See also the list of acts of the Parliament of Ireland.

For acts passed from 1801 onwards, see the list of acts of the Parliament of the United Kingdom. For acts of the devolved parliaments and assemblies in the United Kingdom, see the list of acts of the Scottish Parliament, the list of acts of the Northern Ireland Assembly, and the list of acts and measures of Senedd Cymru; see also the list of acts of the Parliament of Northern Ireland.

The number shown after each act's title is its chapter number. Acts are cited using this number, preceded by the year(s) of the reign during which the relevant parliamentary session was held; thus the Union with Ireland Act 1800 is cited as "39 & 40 Geo. 3. c. 67", meaning the 67th act passed during the session that started in the 39th year of the reign of George III and which finished in the 40th year of that reign. Note that the modern convention is to use Arabic numerals in citations (thus "41 Geo. 3" rather than "41 Geo. III"). Acts of the last session of the Parliament of Great Britain and the first session of the Parliament of the United Kingdom are both cited as "41 Geo. 3".

Acts passed by the Parliament of Great Britain did not have a short title; however, some of these acts have subsequently been given a short title by acts of the Parliament of the United Kingdom (such as the Short Titles Act 1896).

Before the Acts of Parliament (Commencement) Act 1793 came into force on 8 April 1793, acts passed by the Parliament of Great Britain were deemed to have come into effect on the first day of the session in which they were passed. Because of this, the years given in the list below may in fact be the year before a particular act was passed.

== 10 Geo. 1 ==
The second session of the 6th Parliament of Great Britain, which met from 9 January 1724 until 24 April 1724.

This session was also traditionally cited as 10 G. 1.

=== Public acts ===
Short title	Citation	Royal assent
Long title
Land Tax Act 1723 (repealed)	10 Geo. 1. c. 1	18 February 1724
An Act for granting an Aid to His Majesty, by a Land Tax in Great Britain, to be raised for the Service of the Year One Thousand Seven Hundred Twenty-four. (Repealed by Statute Law Revision Act 1867 (30 & 31 Vict. c. 59))
Taxation, etc. Act 1723 (repealed)	10 Geo. 1. c. 2	19 March 1724
An Act for continuing the Duties on Malt, Mum, Cyder, and Perry, to raise Money, by Way of a Lottery, for the Service of the Year One Thousand Seven Hundred Twenty-four; and touching lost Bills, Tickets, Certificates, or Orders; and for giving further Time for Payment of the Duties on Money given with Apprentices; and for appropriating the Supplies granted in this Session of Parliament. (Repealed by Statute Law Revision Act 1867 (30 & 31 Vict. c. 59))
Mutiny Act 1723 (repealed)	10 Geo. 1. c. 3	19 March 1724
An Act for punishing Mutiny and Desertion; and for the better Payment of the Army and their Quarters. (Repealed by Statute Law Revision Act 1867 (30 & 31 Vict. c. 59))
Papists Act 1723 (repealed)	10 Geo. 1. c. 4	19 March 1724
An Act for explaining and amending an Act of the last Session of Parliament, intituled, "An Act to oblige all Persons, being Papists, in that Part of Great Britain called Scotland, and all Persons in Great Britain, refusing or neglecting to take the Oaths appointed for the Security of His Majesty's Person and Government, by several Acts herein mentioned, to register their Names and Real Estates;" (Note: Papists Act 1722 (9 Geo. 1. c. 24)) and for enlarging the Time for taking the said Oaths, and making such Registers; and for allowing farther Time for the Enrolment of Deeds or Wills made by Papists, which have been omitted to be enrolled pursuant to an Act of the Third Year of His Majesty's Reign; (Note: Papists Act 1716 (3 Geo. 1. c. 18)) and also for giving Relief to Protestant Lessees. (Repealed by Statute Law Revision Act 1867 (30 & 31 Vict. c. 59))
National Debt Act 1723 (repealed)	10 Geo. 1. c. 5	19 March 1724
An Act for redeeming certain Annuities, after the Rate of Five Pounds per Centum per Annum; and for Payment of the Principal and Interest on the Standing Orders for the Blank Tickets in the Lottery granted for the Service of the Year One Thousand Seven Hundred and Fourteen; and for making good the Loss which happened in the Treasury of His Majesty's Exchequer by the Reduction of Guineas; and for granting Relief to Catherine Collingwood Widow. (Repealed by Statute Law Revision Act 1870 (33 & 34 Vict. c. 69))
Middlesex Highways Act 1723 (repealed)	10 Geo. 1. c. 6	19 March 1724
An Act for enlarging the Term granted by an Act passed in the Third Year of His Majesty's Reign, intituled, "An Act for repairing the Highways, from that Part of Counter's Bridge which lies in the Parish of Kensington, in the County of Middlesex, to The Powder Mills, in the Road to Stains, and to Cranford Bridge in the said County, in the Road to Colnbrooke;" (Note: Kensington, Staines and Cranford Bridge Roads Act 1716 (3 Geo. 1. c. 14 Pr.)) and for making the said Act more effectual. (Repealed by Middlesex Roads Act 1766 (7 Geo. 3. c. 88) and Metropolis Turnpike Roads North of the Thames Act 1826 (7 Geo. 4. c. cxlii))
Rye Harbour Act 1723 (repealed)	10 Geo. 1. c. 7	19 March 1724
An Act for making more effectual an Act made in the Ninth Year of His Majesty's Reign, intituled, "An Act for compleating the Repairs of the Harbour of Dover, in the County of Kent; and for restoring the Harbour of Rye, in the County of Sussex, to its ancient Goodness," (Note: Dover Harbour Act 1722 (9 Geo. 1. c. 30)) so far as the same relates to the Harbour of Rye. (Repealed by Rye Harbour Act 1797 (37 Geo. 3. c. 130))
Causey, Yarmouth to Caistor Act 1723	10 Geo. 1. c. 8	19 March 1724
An Act for reviving an Act, passed in the Tenth Year of Her late Majesty's Reign, intituled, "An Act to make a Causeway over The Denes, from Great Yarmouth to Caister, in the County of Norfolk;" (Note: Dene Causeway Act 1711 (10 Ann. c. 14)) and for making the said Act more effectual.
Essex Roads Act 1723 (repealed)	10 Geo. 1. c. 9	19 March 1724
An Act for repairing and amending the Highways, from the North Part of Harlow Bush Common, (Note: Harlow, Essex.) in the Parish of Harlow, to Woodford, (Note: Woodford, now in Greater London, historically in Essex.) in the County of Essex. (Repealed by Road from Harlow Act 1822 (3 Geo. 4. c. xliv))
Excise Act 1723 (repealed)	10 Geo. 1. c. 10	24 April 1724
An Act for repealing certain Duties therein mentioned, payable upon Coffee, Tea, Cocoa Nuts, Chocolate, and Cocoa Paste, imported; and for granting certain Inland Duties in Lieu thereof; and for prohibiting the Importation of Chocolate ready made, and Cocoa Paste; and for better ascertaining the Duties, payable upon Coffee, Tea, and Cocoa Nuts, imported; and for granting Relief to Robert Dalzell late Earl of Carnwath. (Repealed by Statute Law Revision Act 1867 (30 & 31 Vict. c. 59) and Revenue Act 1869 (32 & 33 Vict. c. 14))
Encouragement of Manufacturers Act 1723 (repealed)	10 Geo. 1. c. 11	24 April 1724
An Act to prevent Multiplicity of Prosecutions upon an Act made in the Eleventh and Twelfth Years of the Reign of His late Majesty King William the Third, intituled, "An Act for the more effectual employing the Poor, by incouraging the Manufactures of this Kingdom." (Note: Encouragement of Manufactures Act 1698 (11 Will. 3. c. 10)) (Repealed by Statute Law Revision Act 1867 (30 & 31 Vict. c. 59))
Cambridge Roads Act 1723 (repealed)	10 Geo. 1. c. 12	24 April 1724
An Act for repairing the Roads leading from Stump Cross, in the Parish of Chesterford, in the County of Essex, to Newmarket Heath, and the Town of Cambridge, in the County of Cambridge. (Repealed by Cambridge Roads Act 1790 (30 Geo. 3. c. 94))
Surrey and Sussex Roads Act 1723 (repealed)	10 Geo. 1. c. 13	24 April 1724
An Act for amending the Roads from The Stones End in Southwark, to Highgate, at the Entrance of Ashdown Forest, in the Parish of East Grinsted, in the County of Sussex, and from Kingston to Burton Common, and also the Lane leading from Woodbatch to Sidlow Mill, and the Lanes called Horsehills, Bonehurst alias Boners, and Peteridge Lanes, in the County of Surrey, by enlarging the Terms granted by Two former Acts, One of the Fourth, (Note: London, East Grinstead, Sutton and Kingston Roads Act 1717 (4 Geo. 1. c. 4 Pr.)) and the other of the Sixth (Note: Surrey and Kent Roads Act 1719 (6 Geo. 1. c. 26)) Year of His Majesty's Reign. (Repealed by Statute Law (Repeals) Act 2013 (c. 2))
South Sea Company Act 1723 (repealed)	10 Geo. 1. c. 14	24 April 1724
An Act for enlarging the Times for hearing and determining Claims by the Trustees for raising Money upon the Estates of the late Directors of the South Sea Company and others; and for reviving and continuing the Provision formerly made, against requiring Special Bail, in Actions or Suits upon Contracts for Stock or Subscriptions, between the First Day of December One Thousand Seven Hundred and Nineteen, and the First Day of December One Thousand Seven Hundred and Twenty; and for other Purposes therein mentioned. (Repealed by Statute Law Revision Act 1867 (30 & 31 Vict. c. 59))
Warwick Roads Act 1723 (repealed)	10 Geo. 1. c. 15	24 April 1724
An Act for repairing the Road leading from Dunchurch, in the County of Warwick, to the Bottom of Meriden Hill, in the same County. (Repealed by Road from Dunchurch to Stonebridge Act 1824 (5 Geo. 4. c. xliii))
Greenland Fishery Act 1723 (repealed)	10 Geo. 1. c. 16	24 April 1724
An Act for encouraging the Greenland Fishery. (Repealed by Statute Law Revision Act 1867 (30 & 31 Vict. c. 59))
Continuance of Laws, etc. Act 1723 (repealed)	10 Geo. 1. c. 17	24 April 1724
An Act for continuing Acts for preventing Theft and Rapine upon the Northern Borders of England; and for better regulating of Pilots, and for regulating the Price and Assize of Bread; and for better Encouragement of the making of Sail Cloth in Great Britain. (Repealed by Statute Law Revision Act 1867 (30 & 31 Vict. c. 59))
Manufacture of Serges, etc. Act 1723 (repealed)	10 Geo. 1. c. 18	24 April 1724
An Act to explain and amend an Act passed in the Sixth-Year of His Majesty's Reign, intituled, "An Act for ascertaining the Breadths, and preventing Frauds and Abuses in manufacturing Serges, Plaidings, and Fingrums; and for regulating the Manufactures of Stockings, in that Part of Great Britain called Scotland," (Note: Manufacture of Serges, etc. Act 1719 (6 Geo. 1. c. 13)) so far as the same relates to Serges. (Repealed by Statute Law Revision Act 1867 (30 & 31 Vict. c. 59))
Court of Session Act 1723 (repealed)	10 Geo. 1. c. 19	24 April 1724
An Act for explaining the Law concerning the Trial and Admission of the Ordinary Lords of Session. (Repealed by Statute Law (Repeals) Act 1986 (c. 12))
Examination of Drugs Act 1723 (repealed)	10 Geo. 1. c. 20	24 April 1724
An Act for the better viewing, searching, and examining, all Drugs, Medicines, Waters, Oils, Compositions used or to be used for Medicines, in all Places where the same shall be exposed to Sale, or kept for that Purpose, within the City of London and Suburbs thereof, or within Seven Miles Circuit of the said City. (Repealed by Statute Law Revision Act 1867 (30 & 31 Vict. c. 59))

=== Private acts ===
Short title	Citation	Royal assent
Long title
Herman's Naturalization Act 1723	10 Geo. 1. c. 1 Pr.	18 February 1724
An Act for naturalizing John Herman Gentleman.
Naturalization of William Hodgson, Francis Noguier and Others Act 1723	10 Geo. 1. c. 2 Pr.	18 February 1724
An Act for naturalizing William Hodshon, Francis Noguier, and others.
Naturalization of John Moller and James Horner Act 1723	10 Geo. 1. c. 3 Pr.	18 February 1724
An Act for naturalizing John Gerhardt Moller and James Horner.
St. Martin-in-the Fields Church Rebuilding Act 1723	10 Geo. 1. c. 4 Pr.	19 March 1724
An Act for compleating the re-building the Parish Church of St. Martin in the Fields.
St. Botolphs Bishopsgate Church Rebuilding Act 1723	10 Geo. 1. c. 5 Pr.	19 March 1724
An Act for re-building the Parish Church of St. Botolph's, Bishopsgate, in the City of London, at the Charge of the Inhabitants of the said Parish.
Sunningwell cum Bayworth Inclosure Act 1723	10 Geo. 1. c. 6 Pr.	19 March 1724
An Act to enclose the Common Fields and Commons of Sunningwell cum Bayworth, in the County of Berks.
Oxburgh Common (Norfolk) Inclosure and Drainage Act 1723	10 Geo. 1. c. 7 Pr.	19 March 1724
An Act for draining, improving, and enclosing, the Common called Oxburgh Common, in the Parish of Oxburgh, in the County of Norfolk; and for other Purposes therein mentioned.
Enabling Thomas Duke of Norfolk to make leases for 60 years of houses and ground in Arundel, Norfolk, Howard and Surrey Streets and other tenements in the parish of St. Clement Danes (Middlesex).	10 Geo. 1. c. 8 Pr.	19 March 1724
An Act to enable Thomas Duke of Norfolk to make Leases for Sixty Years, of the Houses and Ground in Arundell Street, Norfolk Street, Howard Street, Surrey Street, and other his Tenements and Estate, in the Parish of St. Clement's Danes, in the County of Middlesex.
Bathurst's Estate Act 1723	10 Geo. 1. c. 9 Pr.	19 March 1724
An Act to vest in Trustees the Manors of Battlesden and Pottesgrave, and divers Lands and Hereditaments, in the County of Bedford, the Estate of Benjamin Bathurst Esquire, to the Intent that the same may be sold, in order to compleat a Purchase by him made of Lands in the County of Gloucester, to be settled to the same Uses.
Whadcock's Estate Act 1723	10 Geo. 1. c. 10 Pr.	19 March 1724
An Act for Sale of the Estate late of Humphrey Whadcock, deceased, for discharging a Debt due to the Crown; and for Payment of such other his Debts as his Personal Estate will not extend to pay; and for settling the Residue of his Lands conformable to his last Will.
Reeves' Estate Act 1723	10 Geo. 1. c. 11 Pr.	19 March 1724
An Act for enabling Pelsant Reeves Gentleman to sell certain Leasehold Lands in Suffolk, settled upon his Marriage; and to purchase other Lands, to be settled to the same Uses.
Naturalization of Henry Voght and Sebastianus Van Weenigem de Vyver Act 1723	10 Geo. 1. c. 12 Pr.	19 March 1724
An Act for naturalizing Henry Voght and Sebastianus Van Weenigem de Vijver.
Descendants of William Lord Craven's Names Act 1723	10 Geo. 1. c. 13 Pr.	24 April 1724
An Act for adding the Surname of Tylney to the Descendants of the Right Honourable William Lord Craven and Anne his Wife, sole Daughter and Heir of Frederick Tylney Esquire.
Enabling His Majesty to grant inheritance of lands in or near Deptford (Kent) to trustees on trust for Sir John Evelyn and heirs, upon a full consideration to be paid for the same.	10 Geo. 1. c. 14 Pr.	24 April 1724
An Act to enable His Majesty to grant the Inheritance of certain Lands and Tenements, in or near Deptford, in the County of Kent, to Trustees, upon Trust, for Sir John Evelyn Baronet and his Heirs, upon a full Consideration to be paid for the same.
Sir Geoffery, Robert and Thomas Palmer's estates: enabling them to convey and settle lands in Leicestershire, Northamptonshire and Lincolnshire.	10 Geo. 1. c. 15 Pr.	24 April 1724
An Act to enable Sir Geffery Palmer Baronet and Robert Palmer Esquire, and the Survivor of them, together with Thomas Palmer Esquire, to convey and settle several Manors and Lands, in the Counties of Leicester, Northampton, and Lincoln.
Pagett's Estate Act 1723	10 Geo. 1. c. 16 Pr.	24 April 1724
An Act for allowing to Thomas Pagett Esquire, out of Fourteen Thousand Pounds vested in Trustees by an Act of Parliament (Note: Pagett's Estate Act 1720 (7 Geo. 1. St. 1. c. 16 Pr.)) for Sale of his Wife's Estate, the Sum of Four Thousand Pounds, upon the Considerations therein mentioned.
Atkin's Estate Act 1723	10 Geo. 1. c. 17 Pr.	24 April 1724
An Act to settle the Estate of Sir Henry Atkins Baronet, according to the Intention of Articles made before his Marriage with Dame Penelope his Wife, Daughter of Sir John Stonhouse Baronet.
Knight's Estate Act 1732	10 Geo. 1. c. 18 Pr.	24 April 1724
An Act for explaining the Will of Jacob Knight Esquire, deceased; and charging his Fee Simple Estates with Two Thousand Pounds, and Interest, for the Portion of his Youngest Son Charles Knight.
Vesting the manor of Cold Coniston (Yorkshire) and other lands and tenements in trustees to be sold for payment of the debts of Henry Coulthurst, and other provisions.	10 Geo. 1. c. 19 Pr.	24 April 1724
An Act for vesting the Manor of Coniston Cold, in the County of York; and other Lands and Tenements therein mentioned, in Trustees, to be sold, for Payment of the Debts of Henry Coulthurst Esquire; and for other Purposes therein mentioned.
Vesting copyhold lands in Suffolk, late the estate of Henry Appleton, in trust to be sold for payment of his children's portions.	10 Geo. 1. c. 20 Pr.	24 April 1724
An Act for vesting certain Copyhold Lands, in the County of Suffolk, late the Estate of Henry Appleton Esquire, deceased, in Trust, to be sold, for Payment of his Children's Portions.
Bagenall's Estate Act 1732	10 Geo. 1. c. 21 Pr.	24 April 1724
An Act for vesting the Estates of Walter Bagenal Esquire, and his Two Daughters, in the Counties of Dublin and Meath, in the Kingdom of Ireland, in Trustees, to be sold, for Payment of the Debts charged thereupon; and raising Portions for the said Daughters.
Howe's Estate Act 1723	10 Geo. 1. c. 22 Pr.	24 April 1724
An Act to enable John Howe of Stowell in the County of Gloucester Esquire to sell the Manor or Lordship of Ellerton, alias Ellerton upon Swale, and all other his Lands and Hereditaments, in the County of York, comprized in his Marriage Settlement; he having settled other Lands and Hereditaments, in the County of Gloucester, of greater Value, to the same Uses, in Lieu thereof.
Enabling Viscount Falmouth and Richard Edgcombe to take in Great Britain the oath of office as Vice-Treasurer and Receiver General and Paymaster General of all His Majesty's revenues in Ireland, and to qualify themselves for the enjoyment of the said offices.	10 Geo. 1. c. 23 Pr.	24 April 1724
An Act to enable Hugh Viscount Falmouth and Richard Edgecumbe Esquire to take, in Great Britain, the Oath of Office, as Vice Treasurer and Receiver General and Paymaster General of all His Majesty's Revenues in the Kingdom of Ireland; and to qualify themselves for the Enjoyment of the said Offices.
Enabling George Dodington to take in Great Britain the oaths of office as Writer of the Tallies and Counter-Tallies, and Clerk of the Pells in the Receipt of the Exchequer in Ireland, and to qualify himself for the enjoyment of the said offices.	10 Geo. 1. c. 24 Pr.	24 April 1724
An Act to enable George Dodington Esquire to take, in Great Britain, the Oaths of Office, as Writer of the Tallies and Counter Tallies, and Clerk of the Pells, in the Receipt of the Exchequer in the Kingdom of Ireland; and to qualify himself for the Enjoyment of the said Offices.
Wern's Naturalization Act 1723	10 Geo. 1. c. 25 Pr.	24 April 1724
An Act to naturalize John Wern.
Naturalization of John Van Rixtell and Ludolph Schaart Act 1723	10 Geo. 1. c. 26 Pr.	24 April 1724
An Act to naturalize John Van Rixtell and Ludolff Schaart.

=== Sources ===
- Pickering, Danby, ed. (1765). "Anno decimo Georgii I". The Statutes at Large. Vol. 15: From the Ninth Year of King George I to the Second Year of King George II. Cambridge: Joseph Bentham. pp. 120–175 – via Internet Archive.
- Pickering, Danby, ed. (1765). "Anno decimo Georgii I". The Statutes at Large. Vol. 15: From the Ninth Year of King George I to the Second Year of King George II. Cambridge: Joseph Bentham. pp. 120–175 – via Google Books.
- Pickering, Danby, ed. (1765). "Anno decimo Georgii I". The Statutes at Large. Vol. 15: From the Ninth Year of King George I to the Second Year of King George II. Cambridge: Joseph Bentham. pp. 120–175 – via Internet Archive.
- Journals of the House of Commons. Vol. 20. London: His Majesty's Stationery Office. 1803. pp. 224–330 – via Google Books.
- Chronological Table of and Index to the Statutes. Vol. 1: To the End of the Session 59 Vict. Sess. 2 (1895) (13th ed.). London: Her Majesty's Stationery Office. 1896. p. 97 – via Google Books.

== See also ==
- List of acts of the Parliament of Great Britain
