= John Plunket =

John Plunket or Plunkett may refer to:

- John Plunket (judge) (c. 1497–1582), Irish politician and judge, Lord Chief Justice of Ireland
- John Plunket (Jacobite) (1664–1738), Irish Jacobite
- John Plunket, 3rd Baron Plunket (1793–1871), Irish peer and Queen's Counsel
- John Plunkett (1802–1869), Attorney-General of New South Wales
- John Plunkett, 17th Baron of Dunsany (1853–1899), Anglo-Irish politician and peer
- John Plunkett, 3rd Baron of Dunsany (died 1500), Anglo-Irish nobleman
