= John Plunket (Jacobite) =

Irish Jacobite

Attainder of John Plunket Act 1722
- Act of Parliament
- Parliament of Great Britain
- Long title: An Act to inflict Pains and Penalties on John Plunket.
- Citation: 9 Geo. 1. c. 15
- Territorial extent: Great Britain

Dates
- Royal assent: 27 May 1723
- Commencement: 9 October 1722 (Note: Start of session.)
- Repealed: 16 June 1977
Other legislation
Repealed by	Statute Law (Repeals) Act 1977
Relates to	Attainder of George Kelley Act 1722; Attainder of Bishop of Rochester Act 1722

Status: Repealed

Text of statute as originally enacted

John Plunket (1664–1738), was an Irish Jacobite, a key player in the Atterbury Plot of the 1720s aimed at restoring the House of Stuart to the throne of Great Britain. He sometimes used the alias of John Rogers.

Plunket was born in Dublin in 1664 and brought up as a Roman Catholic. He was sent to be educated at the Jesuits' College at Vienna.

After the Glorious Revolution of 1688, Plunket spent over twenty years in the service of leading Jacobites, sometimes as a spy and sometimes as a diplomatic agent of James II, building up a wide acquaintance with the statesmen of many European countries. He received many promises of support.

The hopes of the Jacobites were raised by the defeat of the Whigs in Great Britain in 1710, strengthening the position of the new Tory government. Many believed Robert Harley was at heart a Jacobite, and negotiations begun with the France of Louis XIV in the autumn of 1711 were seen as leading to secret negotiations with James Francis Edward Stuart, the Pretender. Plunket worked to promote the Jacobite cause by revealing Whig plotting to the Tories. In January 1712, Prince Eugene of Savoy came to England and had meetings at Leicester House with Marlborough, the imperial envoy Gallas, and leading Hanoverians.

In March 1712, Plunket sent Harley two forged letters appearing to be from Eugène to Count Zinzendorf, the imperial ambassador at The Hague, to go to Vienna. These claimed that the Whigs were planning the assassination of Tory leaders and other outrages. Harley was not deceived, but Prince Eugène became unpopular in England, and the letters were used to persuade Torcy and the French negotiators at Utrecht, of the dangers of peace against the wishes of a powerful faction. Plunket, disappointed, brought his forged revelations to Harcourt and the Duke of Buckinghamshire, who shared them with the privy council. On 3 April, Plunket was called in for questioning, and said his information came from a clerk of Zinzendorf in The Hague. He was sent away with the suggestion that he went over to Holland to bring this clerk back. Jonathan Swift treats the claims as substantially true in his “Four closing Years of Queen Anne“.

Plunket went back to the continent, visited Rome, and had meetings with the Pretender. He returned to England in 1718, and in January 1723, while lodging in Lambeth, he was charged with being a conspirator in Christopher Layer's plot for seizing the Tower of London. He was found to have written letters to Middleton, Dillon, and other prominent Jacobites, urging them to get support from the Regent of France, and promising a wide support in England. He was also accused of trying to corrupt some sergeants in the British Army. A bill “for inflicting certain pains and penalties upon John Plunket“ had a second reading in the House of Commons on 28 March 1723, when Plunket made no defence. When it came to the House of Lords, he claimed to be an insignificant figure in Jacobite circles, but his correspondence did not support this.

Plunket was imprisoned as a state prisoner in the Tower of London for many years. In July 1738, “at the public expense he was removed into private lodgings and cut for the stone by Mr. Cheselden”, but the operation was a failure, and Plunket died in August. He was buried in the St Pancras churchyard.

== Bibliography ==
- Hist. Reg. 1738, p. 32
- Wyon's History of the Reign of Queen Anne, II, 368
- Stanhope's History of England (1839), I, 75
- Coxe's Life of Marlborough (1848), III, 289
- Macpherson's Original Papers, II, 284
- Boyer's Annals
- Le-grelle's Succession d'Espagne, v. 600–40
- Dumont's Lettres Historiques, 1710
- Mémoires de Torcy II (1757), 271–274
- Jonathan Swift, Four closing Years of Queen Anne
- Bolingbroke's Works, V (1798)
