= Papists Act 1722 =

Act of the Parliament of Great Britain

- Act of Parliament
- Parliament of Great Britain
- Long title: An Act to oblige all Persons being Papists, in that Part of Great Britain called Scotland, and all Persons in Great Britain refusing or neglecting to take the Oaths appointed for the Security of His Majesty's Person and Government, by several Acts herein mentioned, to register their Names and Real Estates.
- Citation: 9 Geo. 1. c. 24
- Territorial extent: Great Britain

Dates
- Royal assent: 27 May 1723
- Commencement: 9 October 1722 (Note: Start of session.)
- Repealed: 15 July 1867
Other legislation
Amended by	Papists Act 1723
Repealed by	Statute Law Revision Act 1867
Relates to	Papists Act 1716; Taxation Act 1722

Status: Repealed

Text of statute as originally enacted

The Papists Act 1722 (9 Geo. 1. c. 24) was an act of the Parliament of Great Britain, enacted after the discovery of the Jacobite Atterbury Plot. The act required landowners to take the oaths of allegiance, supremacy, and abjuration, by 25 December 1723; those who declined were to register their estates by 25 March 1724 (N.S)/1723 (O.S).

If they failed to do so they risked forfeiting their estates.

== Subsequent developments ==
Papists Act 1723
- Act of Parliament
- Parliament of Great Britain
- Long title: An Act for explaining and amending an act of the last session of parliament, intituled, an act to oblige all persons, being papists, in that part of Great Britain called Scotland, and all persons in Great Britain, refusing or neglecting to take the oaths appointed for the security of His Majesty's person and government, by several acts herein mentioned, to register their names and real estates, and for enlarging the time for taking the said oaths, and making such registers, and for allowing farther time for the enrolment of deeds or wills made by papists, which have been omitted to be enrolled, pursuant to an act of the third year of his Majesty's reign; and also for giving relief to protestant lessees.
- Citation: 10 Geo. 1. c. 4
- Territorial extent: Great Britain

Dates
- Royal assent: 19 March 1724
- Commencement: 9 January 1724
- Repealed: 15 July 1867
Other legislation
Amends	Papists Act 1722
Repealed by	Statute Law Revision Act 1867
Relates to	Papists Act 1716; Papists Act 1732

Status: Repealed

Text of statute as originally enacted

The act was revoked by the Papists Act 1723 (10 Geo. 1. c. 4).

The whole act was repealed by section 1 of, and the schedule to, the Statute Law Revision Act 1867 (30 & 31 Vict. c. 59).
