= List of acts of the Parliament of Great Britain from 1722 =

This is a complete list of acts of the Parliament of Great Britain for the year 1722.

For acts passed until 1707, see the list of acts of the Parliament of England and the list of acts of the Parliament of Scotland. See also the list of acts of the Parliament of Ireland.

For acts passed from 1801 onwards, see the list of acts of the Parliament of the United Kingdom. For acts of the devolved parliaments and assemblies in the United Kingdom, see the list of acts of the Scottish Parliament, the list of acts of the Northern Ireland Assembly, and the list of acts and measures of Senedd Cymru; see also the list of acts of the Parliament of Northern Ireland.

The number shown after each act's title is its chapter number. Acts are cited using this number, preceded by the year(s) of the reign during which the relevant parliamentary session was held; thus the Union with Ireland Act 1800 is cited as "39 & 40 Geo. 3. c. 67", meaning the 67th act passed during the session that started in the 39th year of the reign of George III and which finished in the 40th year of that reign. Note that the modern convention is to use Arabic numerals in citations (thus "41 Geo. 3" rather than "41 Geo. III"). Acts of the last session of the Parliament of Great Britain and the first session of the Parliament of the United Kingdom are both cited as "41 Geo. 3".

Acts passed by the Parliament of Great Britain did not have a short title; however, some of these acts have subsequently been given a short title by acts of the Parliament of the United Kingdom (such as the Short Titles Act 1896).

Before the Acts of Parliament (Commencement) Act 1793 came into force on 8 April 1793, acts passed by the Parliament of Great Britain were deemed to have come into effect on the first day of the session in which they were passed. Because of this, the years given in the list below may in fact be the year before a particular act was passed.

== 9 Geo. 1 ==
The first session of the 6th Parliament of Great Britain, which met from 9 October 1722 until 27 May 1723.

This session was also traditionally cited as 9 G. 1.

=== Public acts ===
Short title	Citation	Royal assent
Long title
Habeas Corpus Suspension Act 1722 (repealed)	9 Geo. 1. c. 1	17 October 1722
An Act to empower His Majesty to secure and detain such Persons as His Majesty shall suspect are conspiring against His Person and Government. (Repealed by Statute Law Revision Act 1867 (30 & 31 Vict. c. 59))
Land Tax Act 1722 (repealed)	9 Geo. 1. c. 2	19 December 1722
An Act for granting an Aid to His Majesty, by a Land Tax, to be raised in Great Britain, for the Service of the Year One Thousand Seven Hundred Twenty-three. (Repealed by Statute Law Revision Act 1867 (30 & 31 Vict. c. 59))
Taxation (No. 1) Act 1722 (repealed)	9 Geo. 1. c. 3	28 January 1723
An Act for continuing the Duties on Malt, Mum, Cyder, and Perry, to raise Money (by Way of a Lottery) for the Service of the Year One Thousand Seven Hundred Twenty-three. (Repealed by Statute Law Revision Act 1867 (30 & 31 Vict. c. 59))
Mutiny Act 1722 (repealed)	9 Geo. 1. c. 4	22 March 1723
An Act for punishing Mutiny and Desertion; and for the better Payment of the Army and their Quarters. (Repealed by Statute Law Revision Act 1867 (30 & 31 Vict. c. 59))
National Debt Act 1722 (repealed)	9 Geo. 1. c. 5	22 March 1723
An Act for redeeming certain Annuities, now payable by the Cashier of the Bank of England, at the Rate of Five Pounds per Centum per Annum. (Repealed by Statute Law Revision Act 1870 (33 & 34 Vict. c. 69))
National Debt (No. 2) Act 1722 (repealed)	9 Geo. 1. c. 6	22 March 1723
An Act for reviving and adding Two Millions to the Capital Stock of the South Sea Company; and for reviving a proportional Part of the Yearly Fund, payable at the Exchequer; and for dividing their whole Capital (after such Addition made) into Two equal Parts or Moieties; and for converting One of the said Moieties into certain Annuities, for the Benefit of the Members; and for settling the remaining Moiety in the said Company; and for continuing for One Year longer the Provision formerly made, against requiring Special Bail, in Actions or Suits upon such Contracts as are therein mentioned. (Repealed by Statute Law Revision Act 1870 (33 & 34 Vict. c. 69))
Poor Relief Act 1722 or the Workhouse Test Act 1722 or the Workhouse Test Act 1723 or Knatchbull's Act (repealed)	9 Geo. 1. c. 7	22 March 1723
An Act for amending the Laws relating to the Settlement, Employment, and Relief, of the Poor. (Repealed by Poor Law Act 1927 (17 & 18 Geo. 5. c. 14) and Statute Law Revision Act 1948 (11 & 12 Geo. 6. c. 62))
Continuance of Laws Act 1722 (repealed)	9 Geo. 1. c. 8	22 March 1723
An Act for continuing some Laws; and reviving others, therein mentioned; for exempting Apothecaries from serving Parish and Ward Offices, and upon Juries; and relating to Jurors; and to the Payment of Seamen's Wages; and the Preservation of Naval Stores and Stores of War; and concerning the Militia and Trophy-money; and against clandestine Running of uncustomed Goods; and for more effectual preventing Frauds relating to the Customs, and Frauds in mixing Silk with Stuffs to be exported. (Repealed by Statute Law Revision Act 1867 (30 & 31 Vict. c. 59) and Public Stores Act 1875 (38 & 39 Vict. c. 25))
Norwich, Mayors, Sheriffs, etc. Act 1722 (repealed)	9 Geo. 1. c. 9	22 March 1723
An Act for better qualifying the Manufacturers of Stuffs and Yarn, in the City of Norwich and Liberties thereof, to bear Offices of Magistracy in the said City; and for regulating the Elections of such Officers. (Repealed by Statute Law Revision Act 1948 (11 & 12 Geo. 6. c. 62))
Great Yarmouth Pier Act 1722 (repealed)	9 Geo. 1. c. 10	22 March 1723
An Act for clearing, depthening; repairing, extending, maintaining, and improving, the Haven and Piers of Great Yarmouth; and for depthening and making more navigable the several Rivers emptying themselves at the said Town; and also for preserving Ships wintering in the said Haven from Accidents by Fire. (Repealed by Great Yarmouth Haven Act 1749 (23 Geo. 2. c. 6) and Great Yarmouth (Improvement) Act 1772 (12 Geo. 3. c. 14))
Dunstable Roads Act 1722 (repealed)	9 Geo. 1. c. 11	22 March 1723
An Act for repairing and widening the Road leading from The Black Bull, (Note: The Black Bull was located on the corner of Union Street and High Street North in Dunstable. 51°53′22″N 0°31′34″W) in Dunstable, in the County of Bedford, to the Way (Note: This turning is just south of the Bow Bridge over the River Ver, north-west of St Albans. 51°46′04″N 0°22′15″W) turning out of the said Road up to Shafford House, in the County of Hertford. (Repealed by Bedford and Hertford Roads Act 1786 (26 Geo. 3. c. 130))
National Debt (No. 3) Act 1722 (repealed)	9 Geo. 1. c. 12	10 April 1723
An Act for the more easy assigning or transferring certain Redeemable Annuities, payable at the Exchequer, by Endorsements on the Standing Orders for the same. (Repealed by Statute Law Revision Act 1870 (33 & 34 Vict. c. 69))
Buckinghamshire Highways Act 1722 (repealed)	9 Geo. 1. c. 13	10 April 1723
An Act for the enlarging the Term granted by an Act passed in the Eighth Year of the Reign of Her late Majesty Queen Anne, intituled, "An Act for repairing the Highways between the House commonly called The Horseshoe House; in the Parish of Stoke Goldington, in the County of Bucks, and the Town of Northampton; and for repairing the Road from the North Bridge of Newport Pagnel, (Note: North Bridge is located on the B526 High Street/Northampton Road in Newport Pagnell. 52°05′19″N 0°43′13″W) in the County of Bucks, to the said Horseshoe House." (Note: Northampton Highways Act 1709 (8 Ann. c. 9)) (Repealed by Newport Pagnel Roads Act 1797 (37 Geo. 3. c. 177))
Edinburgh Beer Duties Act 1722 (repealed)	9 Geo. 1. c. 14	10 April 1723
An Act for enlarging the Term granted by an Act made in the Third Year of His Majesty's Reign, (Note: Edinburgh Beer Duties Act 1716 (3 Geo. 1. c. 5)) (for continuing the Duty of Two Pennies Scots upon every Pint of Ale and Beer sold in the City of Edinburgh, for the Purposes therein mentioned; and for discontinuing Payment of the Petty Port Customs there;) and for making the said Act more effectual. (Repealed by Statute Law Revision Act 1948 (11 & 12 Geo. 6. c. 62))
Attainder of John Plunket Act 1722 (repealed)	9 Geo. 1. c. 15	27 May 1723
An Act to inflict Pains and Penalties on John Plunket. (Repealed by Statute Law (Repeals) Act 1977 (c. 18))
Attainder of George Kelley Act 1722 (repealed)	9 Geo. 1. c. 16	27 May 1723
An Act to inflict Pains and Penalties on George Kelley, alias Johnson. (Repealed by Statute Law (Repeals) Act 1977 (c. 18))
Attainder of Bishop of Rochester Act 1722 (repealed)	9 Geo. 1. c. 17	27 May 1723
An Act to inflict Pains and Penalties on Francis, Lord Bishop of Rochester. (Repealed for Great Britain by Statute Law (Repeals) Act 1977 (c. 18) and for the Isle of Man by Statute Law (Repeals) Act 1998 (c. 43))
Taxation Act 1722 (repealed)	9 Geo. 1. c. 18	27 May 1723
An Act for granting an Aid to His Majesty, by laying a Tax upon Papists; and for making such other Persons as, upon due Summons, shall refuse or neglect to take the Oaths therein mentioned, to contribute towards the said Tax, for reimbursing to the Public Part of the great Expences occasioned by the late Conspiracies; and for discharging the Estates of Papists from Two Third Parts of the Rents and Profits thereof for One Year, and all Arrears of the same; and from such Forfeitures as are therein more particularly described. (Repealed by Statute Law Revision Act 1867 (30 & 31 Vict. c. 59))
Lotteries Act 1722 (repealed)	9 Geo. 1. c. 19	27 May 1723
An Act to continue the Duties for Encouragement of the Coinage of Monies; and for Relief of William late Lord Widdrington; and to prevent Foreign Lotteries being carried on in this Kingdom; and for ascertaining the Duties on bound Books imported; and for issuing Certificates and Debentures for Arrears due to Five Regiments, to be satisfied by Annuities therein mentioned; and for discharging the Duties of Rock Salt lost on the Rivers Weaver and Mercy; and for limiting the Times of Continuance of Commissioners for forfeited Estates, in England and Scotland respectively; and for appropriating the Supplies granted to His Majesty in this Session of Parliament; and to rectify Misnomers and Omissions of Commissioners for the Land Tax, in the Year One Thousand Seven Hundred Twenty-three. (Repealed by Statute Law Revision Act 1867 (30 & 31 Vict. c. 59), Statute Law Revision Act 1887 (50 & 51 Vict. c. 59), Betting and Lotteries Act 1934 (24 & 25 Geo. 5. c. 58) and Statute Law Revision Act 1948 (11 & 12 Geo. 6. c. 62), and for Northern Ireland by Betting and Lotteries Act (Northern Ireland) 1957 (c. 19 (N.I.)))
Linlithgow Beer Duties Act 1722 (repealed)	9 Geo. 1. c. 20	27 May 1723
An Act for laying a Duty of Two Pennies Scots, or One Sixth Part of a Penny Sterling, upon every Scots Pint of Ale and Beer brewed and sold within the Town of Linlithgow and Liberties thereof, in the County of West Lothian, for paying the Debts of the said Town; and other Purposes therein mentioned. (Repealed by Statute Law Revision Act 1948 (11 & 12 Geo. 6. c. 62))
Customs Act 1722 (repealed)	9 Geo. 1. c. 21	27 May 1723
An Act for enabling His Majesty to put the Customs of Great Britain under the Management of One or more Commissions; and for better securing and ascertaining the Duties on Tobacco; and to prevent Frauds in exporting Tobacco, and other Goods and Merchandizes, or carrying the same Coastwise. (Repealed by Statute Law Revision Act 1867 (30 & 31 Vict. c. 59))
Criminal Law Act 1722 or the Criminal Law Act 1723 or the Black Act 1722 or the Black Act 1723 or the Waltham Black Act 1722 (repealed)	9 Geo. 1. c. 22	27 May 1723
An Act for the more effectual punishing wicked and evil-disposed Persons going armed in Disguise, and doing Injuries and Violences to the Persons and Properties of His Majesty's Subjects; and for the more speedy bringing the Offenders to Justice. (Repealed for England and Wales by Criminal Statutes Repeal Act 1827 (7 & 8 Geo. 4. c. 27) and for India by Criminal Law (India) Act 1828 (9 Geo. 4. c. 74))
South Sea Company Act 1722 (repealed)	9 Geo. 1. c. 23	27 May 1723
An Act for further enlarging the Times for entering, hearing, and determining, Claims on the Estates vested in the Trustees of the South Sea Company; and for obliging Persons to claim Stock by the Time therein mentioned, for Money Subscriptions; and for other the Purposes therein mentioned. (Repealed by Statute Law Revision Act 1867 (30 & 31 Vict. c. 59))
Papists Act 1722 (repealed)	9 Geo. 1. c. 24	27 May 1723
An Act to oblige all Persons being Papists, in that Part of Great Britain called Scotland, and all Persons in Great Britain refusing or neglecting to take the Oaths appointed for the Security of His Majesty's Person and Government, by several Acts herein mentioned, to register their Names and Real Estates. (Repealed by Statute Law Revision Act 1867 (30 & 31 Vict. c. 59))
Aberdeen Records Act 1722 (repealed)	9 Geo. 1. c. 25	27 May 1723
An Act for making more effectual an Act, passed in the Eighth Year of His present Majesty's Reign, intituled, "An Act for supplying the Records of the Commissary Court of Aberdeen, burnt or lost in the late Fire there." (Note: Aberdeen Commissary Court Records Act 1721 (8 Geo. 1. c. 28)) (Repealed by Statute Law (Repeals) Act 1977 (c. 18))
Trade to the East Indies Act 1722 (repealed)	9 Geo. 1. c. 26	27 May 1723
An Act to prevent His Majesty's Subjects from subscribing, or being concerned in encouraging or promoting any Subscription, for an East India Company, in The Austrian Netherlands; and for the better securing the lawful Trade of His Majesty's Subjects to and from The East Indies. (Repealed by East India Company Act 1793 (33 Geo. 3. c. 52))
Frauds by Journeymen Shoemakers Act 1722 (repealed)	9 Geo. 1. c. 27	27 May 1723
An Act for preventing Journeymen Shoemakers selling, exchanging, or pawning, Boots, Shoes, or Slippers, cut Leather, or other Materials for making Boots, Shoes, or Slippers; and for better regulating the said Journeymen. (Repealed by Master and Servant Act 1889 (52 & 53 Vict. c. 24))
The Mint in Southwark Act 1722 (repealed)	9 Geo. 1. c. 28	27 May 1723
An Act for the more effectual Execution of Justice in a pretended privileged Place, in the Parish of St. George, in the County of Surrey, commonly called The Mint; and for bringing to speedy and exemplary Justice such Offenders as are therein mentioned; and for giving Relief to such Persons as are proper Objects of Charity and Compassion there. (Repealed by Capital Punishment (No. 2) Act 1820 (1 Geo. 4. c. 116) and Statute Law Revision Act 1867 (30 & 31 Vict. c. 59))
Copyholds Act 1722 (repealed)	9 Geo. 1. c. 29	27 May 1723
An Act to enable Lords of Manors more easily to recover their Fines; and to exempt Infants and Femmes Covert from Forfeitures of their Copyhold Estates, in particular Cases. (Repealed by Infants' Property Act 1830 (11 Geo. 4 & 1 Will. 4. c. 65))
Dover Harbour Act 1722 (repealed)	9 Geo. 1. c. 30	27 May 1723
An Act for compleating the Repairs of the Harbour of Dover, in the County of Kent; and for restoring the Harbour of Rye, in the County of Sussex, to its ancient Goodness. (Repealed by Dover Harbour Act 1828 (9 Geo. 4. c. xxxi))
Gloucestershire Highways Act 1722 (repealed)	9 Geo. 1. c. 31	27 May 1723
An Act for repairing the Highways from the City of Gloucester (Note: The North Gate of the City of Gloucester, located on Northgate Street, near the junction with St Aldate Street. 51°52′00″N 2°14′39″W) to the Top of Birdlip Hill (Note: The top of Birlip Hill is in the village of Birdlip, Gloucestershire. 51°49′41″N 2°06′38″W) (being the Road to London), and from the Foot of the said Hill (Note: The junction of Cirencester Road and Ermin Way. 51°50′23″N 2°08′27″W) to the Top of Crickly Hill (Note: The location of the former Air Balloon public house, where the A417 meets the A436. 51°50′37″N 2°05′45″W) (being the Road to Oxford); and to oblige those concerned in the Receipt or Payment of any Monies, by virtue of an Act of the Ninth and Tenth Years of His late Majesty King William, (Note: Birdlip and Crickley Hill Road Act 1697 (9 & 10 Will. 3. c. 18)) touching the repairing the said Highways, to accompt for the same to the Trustees appointed by this Act. (Repealed by Gloucester and Crickley Hill Road Act 1806 (46 Geo. 3. c. l))
Fortifications (Portsmouth) Act 1722	9 Geo. 1. c. 32	27 May 1723
An Act for confirming Articles of Agreement, between the principal Officers of the Ordnance, and Thomas Missing Esquire, for Exchange of some Lands at Portsmouth, for the Service of His Majesty.

=== Private acts ===
Short title	Citation	Royal assent
Long title
Estates of Darcy Dawes and Sarah Roundell: enabling them to make settlements upon their intermarriage of their estates despite their minorities.	9 Geo. 1. c. 1 Pr.	19 December 1722
An Act to enable Darcy Dawes Esquire and Sarah Roundell to make Settlements, upon their Intermarriage, of their several Estates, notwithstanding their respective Minorities.
Naturalization of Luder Mello, Benjamin Berkenhout and others.	9 Geo. 1. c. 2 Pr.	19 December 1722
An Act for naturalizing Luder Mello, Benjamin Berckenhout, and others.
Naturalization of John, Antony and Henry Loubier and others.	9 Geo. 1. c. 3 Pr.	19 December 1722
An Act for naturalizing John Anthony Loubier, Henry Loubier, and others.
William Sheppard: change of surname to Hall, according to the will of William Hall, Serjeant-at-Law, deceased.	9 Geo. 1. c. 4 Pr.	28 January 1723
An Act to enable William Sheppard to change his Surname of Sheppard to Hall, according to the Will of William Hall Serjeant at Law, deceased.
Timothy Watts of Burbage (Leicestershire): change of name to Saint Nicholas, according to the will of Bazil Saint Nicholas, of Knowle (Warwickshire).	9 Geo. 1. c. 5 Pr.	28 January 1723
An Act to enable Timothy Watts, of Burbage, in the County of Leicester, Esquire, and his Heirs, to change and alter their Names to Saint Nicholas, according to the Will of Bazill Saint Nicholas, of Knowle, in the County of Warwick, Esquire, déceased.
Smith's Name Act 1722	9 Geo. 1. c. 6 Pr.	28 January 1723
An Act to enable John Smith and his Heirs to take and use the Surname of Dickonson, according to the Will of John Dickonson Gentleman, deceased.
Vesting in Trustees for William Lounds the reversion in fee expectant upon a term of 99 years now in being and in certain grounds and buildings in St. James's parish (Westminster) and of and in a certain messuage near Knightsbridge, upon paying the value into the Exchequer.	9 Geo. 1. c. 7 Pr.	22 March 1723
An Act to vest in Trustees, for William Lowndes Esquire, the Reversion in Fee, expectant upon a Term of Fourscore and Nineteen Years now in being, of and in certain Pieces of Ground and Buildings thereupon, in the Parish of St. James, within the Liberty of Westminster, and of and in a certain Messuage and Lands at or near Knightsbridge, upon paying the Value thereof into the Exchequer.
Confirmation of exchanges, conveyances and other assurances made by John Jenyns and others, of parts of estates in his marriage settlement with Dorothy his late wife, correction of defects in the settlement and enabling him to make a settlement on a future marriage.	9 Geo. 1. c. 8 Pr.	22 March 1723
An Act to confirm certain Exchanges, Conveyances, and other Assurances, made by John Jenyns Esquire and others, of some Parts of the Estates comprized in the Articles and Settlement made on his Marriage with Dorothy his late Wife; and to supply some Defects in the said Articles and Settlement; and to enable him to make a Settlement on any future Marriage.
Estates of George Bennet and Henry Bennet (his son): vesting in trustees estates in Devon to be sold for certain purposes.	9 Geo. 1. c. 9 Pr.	22 March 1723
An Act for vesting in Trustees the Estates of George Bennet Gentleman, and of Henry Bennet his only Son and Heir, in the County of Devon, to be sold, for the Purposes therein mentioned.
Naturalization of Elizabeth Burr and others.	9 Geo. 1. c. 10 Pr.	22 March 1723
An Act to naturalize Elizabeth Burr and others.
Naturalization of John Berkenhout and Jacob Busk.	9 Geo. 1. c. 11 Pr.	22 March 1723
An Act to naturalize John Berckenhout and Jacob Hansson Busk.
Completion of the sale of the manors of Croxton alias Croxden and Great Yate and other lands, late the estate of Evelyn Duke of Kingston (Lord Privy Seal) in Staffordshire; ascertaining and augmenting the stipend of the minister of Croxton out of the said estate, and charging wholly upon the estate one annuity given to the poor of Croxton and discharging the same estate from other annuities given to the minister and poor of Tong (Salop.) by a deed and will of Gerras Lord Pierrepont and thereby charged upon his estates in Salop. and Staffordshire.	9 Geo. 1. c. 12 Pr.	10 April 1723
An Act for compleating the Sale of the Manors of Croxton, alias Croxden, and Great Yate, and other Lands and Tenements, late the Estate of the most Noble Evelyn Duke of Kingston (Lord Privy Seal), in the County of Stafford; and ascertaining and augmenting the Stipend of the Minister of Croxton aforesaid, out of the same Estate; and for charging One Annuity given to the Poor of Croxton aforesaid wholly upon the said Estate, and discharging the same Estate from other Annuities, given to the Minister and Poor of Tong, in the County of Salop, by a Deed and Will of Gervas Lord Pierrepont, deceased, and thereby charged upon his Estates in the Counties of Salop and Stafford.
Duke of Manchester's Estate Act 1722	9 Geo. 1. c. 13 Pr.	10 April 1723
An Act for confirming and establishing Articles of Agreement, between the most Noble John Duke of Montagu and William Duke of Manchester, and others, upon a Marriage intended between the said Duke of Manchester and the Lady Isabella Eldest Daughter of the said Duke of Montagu.
Earl of Cardigan's Estate Act 1722	9 Geo. 1. c. 14 Pr.	10 April 1723
An Act for the vesting several Woods, Lands, and Coppices, in Stanierne and Geddington, in the County of Northampton, and belonging to the Right Honourable George Earl of Cardigan, in the most Noble John Duke of Montagu and his Heirs; and for vesting and settling other Woods, Lands, and Coppices, lying in the Parishes of Oakley Parva and Stanierne, in the said County of Northampton, in and upon the said George Earl of Cardigan, with Remainders over, and in the Manner herein mentioned.
Edgecombe's Estate Act 1722	9 Geo. 1. c. 15 Pr.	10 April 1723
An Act to enable Richard Edgecumbe Esquire to sell Lands, not exceeding Twenty Acres, to and for the Use of His Majesty, for building a Victualing-office, for the Service of the Royal Navy at Plimouth; and to purchase other Lands, to be settled to the same Uses as the Lands to be sold now stand limited by his Marriage Settlement.
Horten's Estate Act 1722	9 Geo. 1. c. 16 Pr.	10 April 1723
An Act to enable Trustees, with the Consent of Mary the Wife of Thomas Horton Esquire, a Lunatic, to execute the Powers in the Marriage Settlement of the said Lunatic, for raising any Sum, not exceeding Three Thousand Pounds, for Elizabeth Horton and Elinor Horton his Daughters; and for other Purposes herein mentioned.
Somer's Estate Act 1722	9 Geo. 1. c. 17 Pr.	10 April 1723
An Act for vesting certain Lands, Tenements, and Hereditaments, of Richard Sommers Esquire, in the County of Kent, in Trustees, to be sold, for Payment of a Debt now owing and charged thereon, on account of his late Brother and Sisters Portions.
Baring's Naturalization Act 1722	9 Geo. 1. c. 18 Pr.	10 April 1723
An Act for naturalizing John Baring.
Clayton's Estate Act 1722	9 Geo. 1. c. 19 Pr.	10 April 1723
An Act for vesting Part of the Estate of Richard Clayton Esquire, in the County of Salop, in Trustees, to be sold, for Payment of his Debts.
Clifton's Estate Act 1722	9 Geo. 1. c. 20 Pr.	27 May 1723
An Act for vesting the Estates of Sir Gervas Clifton Baronet in Trustees; and to enable him to take an Estate for Life, by Way of Purchase, in Settlements intended to be made of his Estates, on the Marriage of Robert Clifton Esquire, his Son and Heir Apparent.
Anderson's Estate Act 1722	9 Geo. 1. c. 21 Pr.	27 May 1723
An Act for vesting Part of the Estate of Sir Richard Anderson Baronet, deceased, in Trustees, to be sold, for the Payment of his Debts; and for other Purposes therein mentioned.
Gower's Estate Act 1722	9 Geo. 1. c. 22 Pr.	27 May 1723
An Act for Sale of the Manor of Queenhill, and other the Lands therein mentioned, in the County of Worcester, for raising Monies, for and towards Payment of the Debts of William Gower Esquire, and of John Gower his Son, deceased; and for discharging the said Manor and Lands of and from the same.

=== Sources ===
- Pickering, Danby, ed. (1765). "Anno nono Georgii I". The Statutes at Large. Vol. 15: From the Ninth Year of King George I to the Second Year of King George II. Cambridge: Joseph Bentham. pp. 1–119 – via Internet Archive.
- Pickering, Danby, ed. (1765). "Anno nono Georgii I". The Statutes at Large. Vol. 15: From the Ninth Year of King George I to the Second Year of King George II. Cambridge: Joseph Bentham. pp. 1–119 – via Google Books.
- Pickering, Danby, ed. (1765). "Anno nono Georgii I". The Statutes at Large. Vol. 15: From the Ninth Year of King George I to the Second Year of King George II. Cambridge: Joseph Bentham. pp. 1–119 – via Internet Archive.
- Journals of the House of Commons. Vol. 20. London: His Majesty's Stationery Office. 1803. pp. 7–223 – via Google Books.
- Chronological Table of and Index to the Statutes. Vol. 1: To the End of the Session 59 Vict. Sess. 2 (1895) (13th ed.). London: Her Majesty's Stationery Office. 1896. pp. 96–97 – via Google Books.

== See also ==
- List of acts of the Parliament of Great Britain
