= Francis Atterbury =

English man of letters, politician and bishop

The Right Reverend Francis Atterbury
- Bishop of Rochester
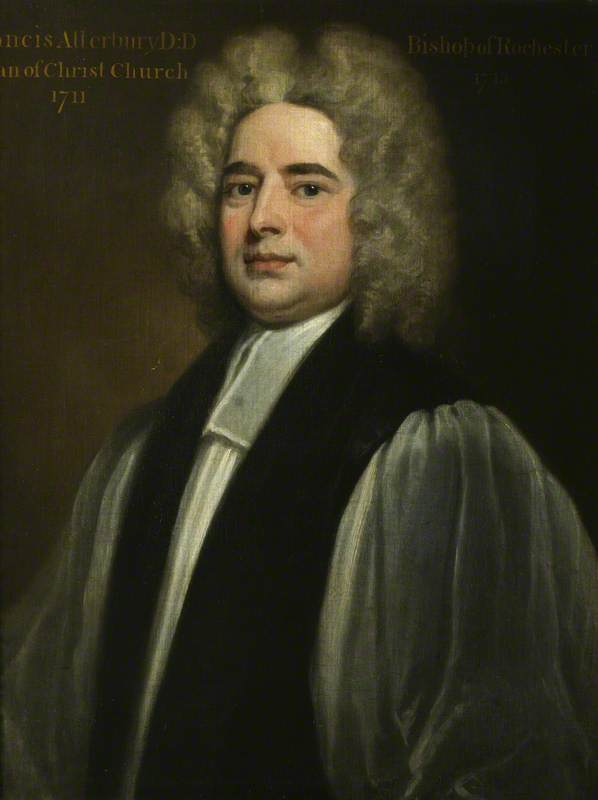
- Francis Atterbury by Godfrey Kneller
- Diocese: Diocese of Rochester
- In office: 1713–1723
- Predecessor: Thomas Sprat
- Successor: Samuel Bradford

Orders
- Ordination: 1687
- Consecration: 1713

Personal details
- Born: 6 March 1663 Middleton, Buckinghamshire, England
- Died: 22 February 1732 (aged 68) Paris, France
- Buried: Westminster Abbey
- Denomination: Church of England
- Education: Christ Church, Oxford

Francis Atterbury (6 March 1663 – 22 February 1732) was an English man of letters, politician and bishop. A High Church Tory and Jacobite, he gained patronage under Queen Anne, but was mistrusted by the Hanoverian Whig ministries, and banished for communicating with the Old Pretender in the Atterbury Plot. He was a noted wit and a gifted preacher.

== Early life ==
He was born at Middleton, Milton Keynes, in Buckinghamshire, where his father was rector. He was educated at Westminster School and Christ Church, Oxford, where he became a tutor. In 1682 he published a translation of Dryden's Absalom and Achitophel into Latin verse with neither the style nor the versification typical of the Augustan age. In English composition he met greater success; in 1687 he published An Answer to some Considerations, the Spirit of Martin Luther and the Original of the Reformation, a reply to Obadiah Walker, who, when elected master of University College, Oxford, in 1676, had printed in a press set up by him there an attack on the Reformation written by Abraham Woodhead. Atterbury's treatise, though highly praised by Bishop Gilbert Burnet, was more distinguished for the vigour of his rhetoric than the soundness of his arguments, and the Papists accused him of treason, and of having, by implication, called King James "Judas".

== Clerical career ==
After the "Glorious Revolution", Atterbury readily swore fealty to the new government. He had taken holy orders in 1687, preached occasionally in London with an eloquence which raised his reputation, and was soon appointed one of the royal chaplains. He ordinarily lived at Oxford, where he was the chief adviser and assistant of Henry Aldrich, under whom Christ Church was a stronghold of Toryism. He inspired a pupil, Charles Boyle, in the Examination of Dr. Bentley's Dissertations on the Epistles of Phalaris, an attack (1698) on the Whig scholar Richard Bentley, arising out of Bentley's impugnment of the genuineness of the Epistles of Phalaris. He was figured by Swift in The Battle of the Books as the Apollo who directed the fight, and was, no doubt, largely the author of Boyle's essay. Bentley spent two years in preparing his famous reply, which proved not only that the letters ascribed to Phalaris were spurious, but that all Atterbury's wit and eloquence were a cloak for an audacious pretence at scholarship.

Atterbury was soon occupied in a dispute about matters still more important and exciting. High church and Low church divided the nation. The majority of the clergy were on the High Church side; the majority of King William's bishops were inclined to latitudinarianism. In 1701 the Convocation, of which the lower house was overwhelmingly Tory, met after a gap of ten years. Atterbury threw himself with characteristic energy into the controversy, publishing a series of treatises. Many regarded him as the most intrepid champion that had ever defended the rights of the clergy against the oligarchy of Erastian prelates. In 1701 he became Archdeacon of Totnes and received a prebend in Exeter Cathedral. The lower house of Convocation voted him thanks for his services; the University of Oxford made him a Doctor of Divinity (D.D.); and in 1704, soon after the accession of Queen Anne, he was promoted to the Deanery of Carlisle Cathedral.

== Leadership of High Church Party ==
In 1710, the prosecution of Henry Sacheverell produced a formidable explosion of High Church fanaticism. At such a moment Atterbury could not fail to be conspicuous. His inordinate zeal for the body to which he belonged and his rare talents for agitation and for controversy were again displayed. He took a chief part in framing that artful and eloquent speech which Sacheverell made at the bar of the House of Lords, and which presents a singular contrast to the absurd and scurrilous sermon which had very unwisely been honoured with impeachment. During the troubled and anxious months which followed the trial, Atterbury was among the most active of those pamphleteers who inflamed the nation against the Whig ministry and the Whig parliament. When the ministry changed and the parliament was dissolved, rewards were showered upon him. The lower house of Convocation elected him prolocutor, in which capacity he drew up, in 1711, the often-cited Representation of the State of Religion; and in August 1711, the queen, who had selected him as her chief adviser in ecclesiastical matters, appointed him Dean of Christ Church on the death of his old friend and patron Henry Aldrich.

At Oxford he was as conspicuous a failure as he had been at Carlisle, and it was said by his enemies that he was made a bishop because he was so bad a dean. Under his administration, Christ Church was in confusion, scandalous altercations took place, and there was reason to fear that the great Tory college would be ruined by the tyranny of the great Tory doctor. In 1713 he was removed to the bishopric of Rochester, which was then always united with the deanery of Westminster. Still higher dignities seemed to be before him, for though there were many able men on the episcopal bench, there was none who equalled or approached him in parliamentary talents. Had his party continued in power it is not improbable that he would have been raised to the archbishopric of Canterbury. The more splendid his prospects the more reason he had to dread the accession of a family which was well known to be partial to the Whigs, and there is every reason to believe that he was one of those politicians who hoped that they might be able, during the life of Anne, to prepare matters in such a way that at her death there might be little difficulty in setting aside the Act of Settlement and placing James Francis Edward Stuart (The 'Old Pretender') on the throne.

== Jacobitism ==
Queen Anne's sudden death confounded the projects of these conspirators, and, whatever Atterbury's previous views may have been, he acquiesced in what he could not prevent, took the oaths to the House of Hanover, and did his best to ingratiate himself with the royal family. But his servility was requited with cold contempt; he became the most factious and pertinacious of all the opponents of the government. In the House of Lords his oratory, lucid, pointed, lively and set off with every grace of pronunciation and of gesture, aroused the attention and admiration even of a hostile majority. Some of the most remarkable protests which appear in the journals of the peers were drawn up by him; and, in some of the bitterest of those pamphlets which called on the English to stand up for their country against the aliens who had come from beyond the seas to allegedly oppress and plunder her, critics have detected his style. When the rebellion of 1715 broke out, he refused to sign the paper in which the bishops of the province of Canterbury declared their attachment to the Protestant accession, and in 1717, after having been long in indirect communication with the exiled family, he began to correspond directly with James Francis Edward Stuart.

Recent findings from the State Papers at Kew have established that Atterbury was the 'Grand Prelate' of the Jacobite Order of Toboso in England. The Order of Toboso was a Jacobite fraternity named in honour of Dulcinea del Toboso, the imaginary amour of Don Quixote. Both Charles Edward Stuart and Henry Benedict Stuart were members.

== Arrest and imprisonment ==
Attainder of Bishop of Rochester Act 1722
- Act of Parliament
- Parliament of Great Britain
- Long title: An Act to inflict Pains and Penalties on Francis, Lord Bishop of Rochester.
- Citation: 9 Geo. 1. c. 17
- Territorial extent: Great Britain

Dates
- Royal assent: 27 May 1723
- Commencement: 9 October 1722 (Note: Start of session.)
- Repealed: Great Britain: 16 June 1977; Isle of Man: 19 November 1998
Other legislation
Repealed by	Great Britain: Statute Law (Repeals) Act 1977; Isle of Man: Statute Law (Repeals) Act 1998
Relates to	Attainder of John Plunket Act 1722; Attainder of George Kelley Act 1722

Status: Repealed

Text of statute as originally enacted

In 1721, on the discovery of the plot for the capture of the royal family and the proclamation of "King James III", Atterbury was arrested with the other chief malcontents, and in 1722 committed to the Tower of London, where he remained in close confinement during some months. He had carried on his correspondence with the exiled family so cautiously that the circumstantial proofs of his guilt, though sufficient to produce entire moral conviction, were not sufficient to justify legal conviction. He could be reached only by a bill of pains and penalties. In 1723 such a bill passed the Commons depriving him of his spiritual dignities, banishing him for life, and forbidding any British subject to hold intercourse with him except by the royal permission. In the Lords the contest was sharp, but the bill finally passed by eighty-three votes to forty-three.

After a short stay at Brussels he went to Paris, and became the leading man among the Jacobite refugees there. He was invited to Rome by the Pretender, but Atterbury felt that a bishop of the Church of England would be out of place in Rome, and declined the invitation. During some months, however, he seemed to be high in the good graces of James. The correspondence between the master and the servant was constant. Atterbury's merits were warmly acknowledged, his advice was respectfully received, and he was, as Bolingbroke had been before him, the prime minister of a king without a kingdom. He soon, however, perceived that his counsels were disregarded, if not distrusted. His proud spirit was deeply wounded. In 1728 he left Paris, occupied his residence at Montpellier, gave up politics, and devoted himself entirely to letters. In the sixth year of his exile he had so severe an illness that his daughter, Mrs Morice, herself very ill, determined to run all risks that she might see him once more. He met her at Toulouse, she received the last rites from him, and died that night.

== Later life and death ==
Atterbury survived the shock of his daughter's death, and returned to Paris and to the service of the Pretender. In the ninth year of his banishment he published a vindication of himself against John Oldmixon, who had accused him of having, in concert with other Christ Church men, garbled the new edition of Clarendon's History of the Rebellion. He was not one of the editors of the History, and had never seen it until it was printed. Atterbury died, aged 68, on 22 February 1732. His body was brought to England, and interred in Westminster Abbey. In his papers now kept at the Library of Westminster, he desired to be buried "as far from kings and politicians as may be." Thus he is buried next to a 21st-century tourist information booth kiosk. The black slab is simple, indicating his name, birth and death dates; the inscription is now considerably worn.

Of his wife, Katherine Osborn, whom he married while at Oxford, little is known; but between him and his daughter there was affection. His fondness for John Milton was such as to many Tories seemed a crime; and he was the close friend of Joseph Addison. He lived on friendly terms with Jonathan Swift, John Arbuthnot and John Gay. With Matthew Prior he had a close intimacy. Alexander Pope found in Atterbury an admirer, adviser, and editor as requested.

== Works ==
- 1701 – The rights, powers, and privileges of an English Convocation, stated and vindicated. In answer to a late book of Dr. Wake's, entituled, The authority of Christian princes over their ecclesiastical synods asserted, &c. ...
- 1701 – Additions to the first edition of The rights, powers, and privileges of an English Convocation, stated and vindicated. In answer to a late book of Dr. Wake's, entituled, The authority of Christian princes over their ecclesiastical synods asserted, &c. and to several other pieces
- 1703 – A sermon preach'd before the Honourable House of Commons, at St. Margaret's Westminster, May the 29th. 1701
- 1704 – The rule of doing as we would be done unto explain'd in a sermon preach'd before Her Majesty, at St. James's Chappel, on Sunday, Nov. 5. 1704
- 1707 – A sermon preach'd in the cathedral church of St. Paul; at the funeral of Mr. Tho. Bennet, August 30. 1706
- 1708 – An acquaintance with God the best support under afflictions. A sermon preach'd before the Queen, at St. James's, October 31. 1708
- 1708 – The power of charity to cover sin. A sermon preach'd before the president and governors of the hospitals of Bridewell and Bethlehem, in Bridewell-Chapel, August 16. 1694
- 1709 – A sermon preach'd before the Right Honourable the Lord-Mayor, aldermen, and governors of the several city hospitals. At St. Brigit's, on Tuesday, ... April 26, 1709
- 1709 – 'Concio ad clerum Londinensem, habita, in ecclesia S. Elphegi, Maii XVII. A.D. MDCCIX
- 1714 – The History of the Mitre and Purse : in which the first and second parts of The secret history of the White Staff are fully considered and the hypocrisy and villanies of the Staff himself and laid open and detected
- 1715 – British advice to the freeholders of Great Britain : being an answer to a treasonable libel intitl'd, English advice to the freeholders of England
- 1723 – An answer to some considerations on the spirit of Martin Luther, and the original of the Reformation
- 1734 – Sermons on several occasions. Published from the originals by Thomas Moore
  - Vol. I
  - Vol. II
  - Vol. III
- 1740 – Antonius Musa's character, represented by Virgil, in the person of Iapis: a dissertation: by F. Atterbury, late Bishop of Rochester. Publish'd from His Lordship's manuscript. To which is added, To the Duke of B**, on his birth-day: a poem
- 1799 – Epistolary correspondance, visitation charges, speeches and miscellanies
  - Volume the first
  - Volume the second
  - Volume the third
  - Volume the fourth
  - Volume V
- 1847 – Letters of Francis Atterbury, Bishop of Rochester to the Chevalier de St. George and some of the adherents of the house of Stuart. From the originals in Her Majesty's possession
- 1856 – On religious retirement
- 1869 – Memoirs and correspondence of Francis Atterbury, D. D., Bishop of Rochester. With notices of his distinguished contemporaries
  - Volume the first
  - Volume the second

== Bibliography ==
- Bennett, Gareth V. The Tory crisis in church and state 1688–1730: the career of Francis Atterbury, bishop of Rochester (Clarendon Press, 1975).
- Cruickshanks, Eveline and Howard Erskine-Hill. Atterbury Plot (2004) 312p. scholarly history
- Stephen, Leslie, ed. (1885). "Atterbury, Francis" . Dictionary of National Biography. Vol. 2. London: Smith, Elder & Co. pp. 233–238.
- Thomas Babington Macaulay, Miscellaneous Writings and Speeches -Volume 3, Contributions to the Encyclopædia Britannica.

=== Primary sources ===
- Atterbury, Francis. The Epistolary Correspondence, Visitation Charges, Speeches, and Miscellanies, of the Right Reverend Francis Atterbury...: With Historical Notes... (1784). online

Church of England titles
Preceded by George Snell	Archdeacon of Totnes; 1702–1713	Succeeded by Nicholas Kendall
Preceded by William Grahme	Dean of Carlisle; 1704–1711	Succeeded by George Smalridge
Preceded by Henry Aldrich	Dean of Christ Church, Oxford; 1711–1713	Succeeded by George Smalridge
Preceded by Thomas Sprat	Bishop of Rochester; 1713–1723	Succeeded by Samuel Bradford
Preceded by Thomas Sprat	Dean of Westminster; 1713–1723	Succeeded by Samuel Bradford
