= Atterbury Plot =

Failed conspiracy to overthrow the British government (1721–22)

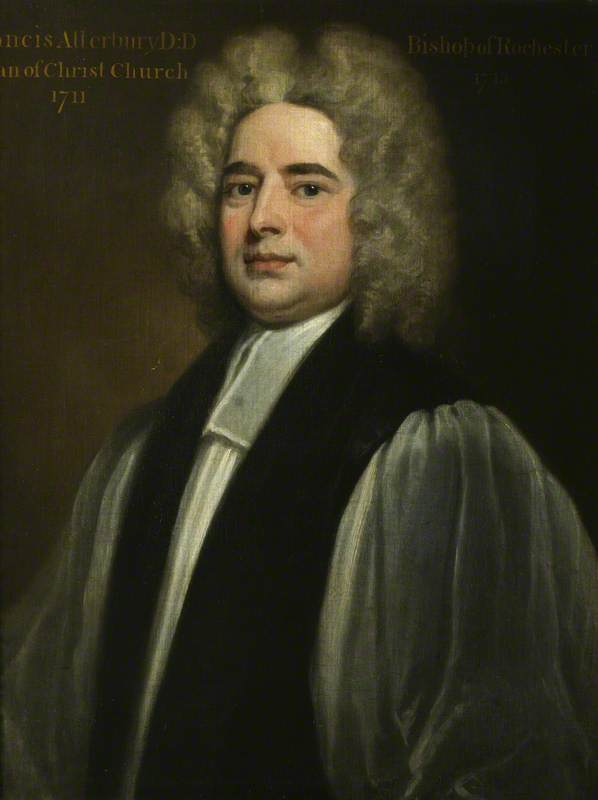
Francis Atterbury, the leader of the conspiracy

The Atterbury Plot was a conspiracy led by Francis Atterbury, Bishop of Rochester and Dean of Westminster, aimed at the restoration of the House of Stuart to the throne of Great Britain. It came some years after the unsuccessful Jacobite rising of 1715 and Jacobite rising of 1719, at a time when the Whig government of the new Hanoverian king was deeply unpopular.

Apart from Atterbury, other conspirators included Charles Boyle, 4th Earl of Orrery, Lord North and Grey, Sir Henry Goring, Christopher Layer, John Plunket, and George Kelly.

The Plot was later considered the greatest threat to the Hanoverians between the Jacobite risings of 1715 and 1745. It collapsed in 1722, when some of the conspirators were charged with treason. However, evidence was in short supply, and Atterbury himself escaped with removal from his Church of England positions and exile.

== Background ==
Atterbury was a Tory and a leader of the High Church party in the Church of England. In 1710, the prosecution of Henry Sacheverell led to an explosion of High Church fanaticism, and Atterbury helped Sacheverell with his defence, then became an active pamphleteer against the Whig ministry. When the ministry changed, rewards came to him. Queen Anne chose him as her chief adviser in church matters, and in August 1711 she appointed him Dean of Christ Church, Oxford, a strongly Tory college. In 1713 he was promoted to become Bishop of Rochester and Dean of Westminster Abbey, and if the Tories had remained in power he might have risen much higher, so he dreaded the Hanoverian accession planned by the Act of Settlement 1701. The death of Queen Anne in 1714 was a setback for him. He took the oath of allegiance to George I, but he became an opponent of the new government. He was in indirect communication with the family of the Pretender, and when the Jacobite rising of 1715 appeared, he refused to sign a declaration in which other bishops attached themselves to the Protestant accession. In 1717 hundreds of Jacobites arrested at the time of the Rising were released from prison by the Act of Grace and Pardon, and Atterbury began to correspond directly with James Francis Edward Stuart. He was later accused of plotting a coup d'état which involved the capture of the Hanoverian royal family and the proclamation of the Pretender as James III.

Events of 1720, notably the Bubble Act and the collapse of the South Sea Company, left the pro-Hanoverian Whig government in disarray and deeply unpopular with the many ruling class investors who had lost heavily. Atterbury seized the moment to conspire with the exiled John Erskine, who at the Jacobite court was the Duke of Mar, and who had been the Pretender's Secretary of State.

== Plot of 1721 ==
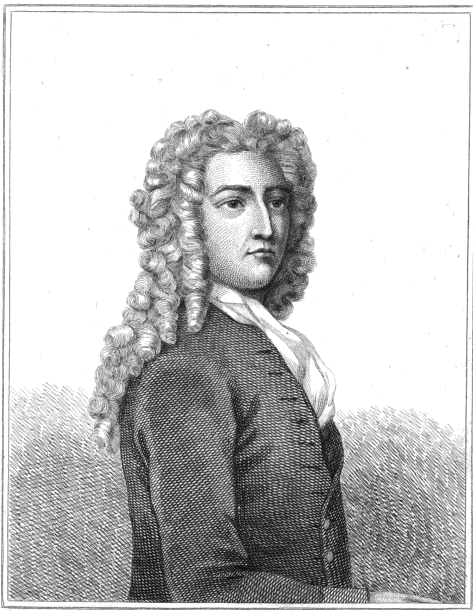
Christopher Layer

The aim of the conspirators was a new Jacobite rising, to coincide with the general election expected in 1722, this date being foreseen because, by the Septennial Act 1716, Parliament was enabled to sit for seven years after the election of 1715.

Sir Henry Goring, who was himself standing (unsuccessfully as turned out) in the election as MP for his old seat of Steyning in Sussex, wrote to the Pretender on 20 March 1721 a letter in which he put forward a plan for a restoration of the Stuart monarchy with the assistance of an invasion by Irish exile troops commanded by the Duke of Ormonde from Spain and Lieutenant-General Dillon from France.

Christopher Layer, a barrister of the Middle Temple and an agent and legal advisor to the "notorious Jacobite" Lord North and Grey, met some fellow plotters regularly at an inn in Stratford-le-Bow, and by the summer of 1721 had succeeded in recruiting some soldiers at Romford and Leytonstone. He then travelled to Rome, where he met the Pretender to reveal the details of a plot. Layer stated that he represented a large number of influential Jacobites, who proposed to recruit old soldiers to seize the Tower of London, the Bank of England, the Royal Mint, and other government buildings in Westminster and the City of London, to capture the Hanoverian royal family, and to kill other key men. English Tories were to summon their men, secure their counties, and march on London, while volunteers from the Irish Brigade of the French Army were to land in England to join them. Layer returned to London with assurances of royal favour from the Pretender.

== Collapse ==
The plot collapsed in England in the spring of 1722, at the time of the death of Charles Spencer, 3rd Earl of Sunderland, who a year before had been forced to resign as First Lord of the Treasury. He died on 19 April, when the Duke of Orleans, Regent of France, made it known to Carteret, Robert Walpole's Secretary of State for the Southern Department, that the Jacobites had asked him to send three thousand men in support of a coup d'état to take place early in May. The French said they had refused permission for the Duke of Ormonde to march a force across France to a channel port and they had also moved their Irish Brigade away from Dunkirk. Sunderland's papers were seized, and a letter of thanks addressed to him by the Pretender came to light.

In England, insufficient money had been collected by the Jacobites to provide enough arms to support a rising, leading Mar (writing in March 1722) to comment on hearing this that Goring, "though a honest, stout, man, had not showed himself very fit for things of this kind."

Walpole's agents began the search for evidence against the leading suspects of Jacobitism, but they found little. Despite this, Walpole gave orders for several men to be arrested: Arran, Strafford, Orrery, North and Grey, Goring, Atterbury, the Duke of Mar's agent George Kelly, and Christopher Layer. Atterbury, who had long been an opponent of Walpole, was named as a conspirator by Mar and was arrested on 24 August 1722, to be charged with treason. He and Orrery were imprisoned in the Tower of London. On 17 October the Habeas Corpus Act was suspended.

Goring, meanwhile, avoided arrest and had fled the country on 23 August; he remained in France until his death in 1731. In his absence, at a trial where he was considered one of the major managers of the plot, his agent stated Goring had attempted to enlist a gang of one thousand brandy smugglers to assist the projected invasion. This led to some government action against such smuggling.

Layer was arrested and lodged with Atterbury in the Tower, his clerks were placed under surveillance, and his wife was arrested and brought to London from Dover. He was less fortunate than most of the others arrested, as two women agreed to give evidence against him. His case was first heard at the Court of King's Bench on 31 October 1722, and a trial began on 21 November before the Lord Chief Justice, John Pratt. Among compromising papers found in the possession of Elizabeth Mason, a brothel-keeper, was one entitled Scheme, said to be in Layer's hand, which outlined a proposed insurrection. The Court was interested to have evidence that the Pretender and his wife had acted as godparents to Layer's daughter, when they were represented at a christening in Chelsea by the proxies Lord North and Grey and the Duchess of Ormonde. After a trial lasting eighteen hours, the jury unanimously found Layer guilty of high treason. On 27 November 1722, he was sentenced to be hanged, drawn, and quartered, but execution was several times delayed, in the hope of his giving information against others, which he refused to do. He was eventually executed at Tyburn on 17 May 1723.

Atterbury's correspondence with the Jacobites in exile which could be found proved to have been so cautious that it was not judged to be enough to lead to his conviction. He was therefore the target of a Pains and Penalties Bill, with the aim of removing him from his church positions, banishing him for life, and forbidding British subjects to communicate with him, by the decision of parliament rather than through prosecution in a court. The evidence offered to parliament consisted chiefly of a spaniel named Harlequin, a present from the Pretender, and some letters found in a lavatory, leading to suspicions that Atterbury was the victim of a Whig conspiracy. However, in May 1723 the Pains and Penalties Bill aimed at him was approved by the Commons and by the Lords, where the voting was eighty-three votes for and forty-three against, being finally enacted on 15 May, two days before the execution of Layer. On 18 June, Atterbury went into exile in France. Orrery remained in the Tower for six months, after which he was given bail. There was insufficient evidence to proceed against him.

Among the other conspirators, John Plunkett and George Kelly were also arrested and were punished by being deprived of their estates. Lord Stafford was suspected, but no action was taken against him, and he continued to play some part in public affairs. Lord North and Grey was known to be involved, but those who could have implicated him refused to do so.

In January 1723, a secret parliamentary committee was established to investigate the Plot, and this reported in March of the same year. The Papists Act 1722 required landowners to take oaths of allegiance by Christmas Day, 1723; those who would not do so were obliged to register their estates and risked forfeiting them.
