= Christopher Layer =

English lawyer (1683–1723)

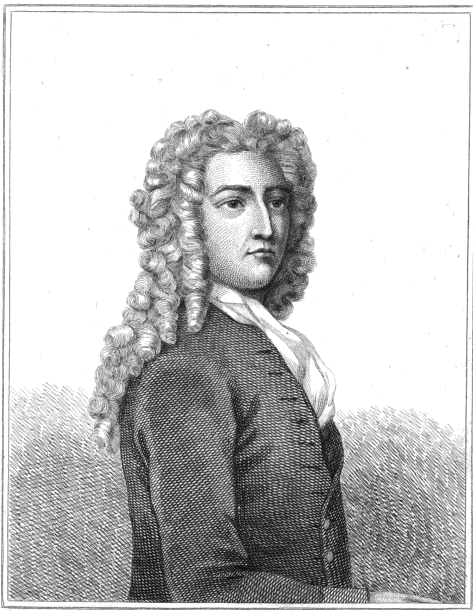
Christopher Layer, at the place of execution

Christopher Layer (12 November 1683 – 17 May 1723) was an English lawyer. As a Jacobite conspirator, he was executed for high treason in 1723 for his part in what became known as the Atterbury Plot.

== Early life ==
Born on 12 November 1683, he was the son of John Layer, a laceman, of Durham Yard, The Strand, London and Anne his wife. He was brought up by his uncle, Christopher Layer, a fox-hunting Norfolk squire, who sent him to Norwich grammar school, and later placed him with an attorney named Repingale at Aylsham, Norfolk.

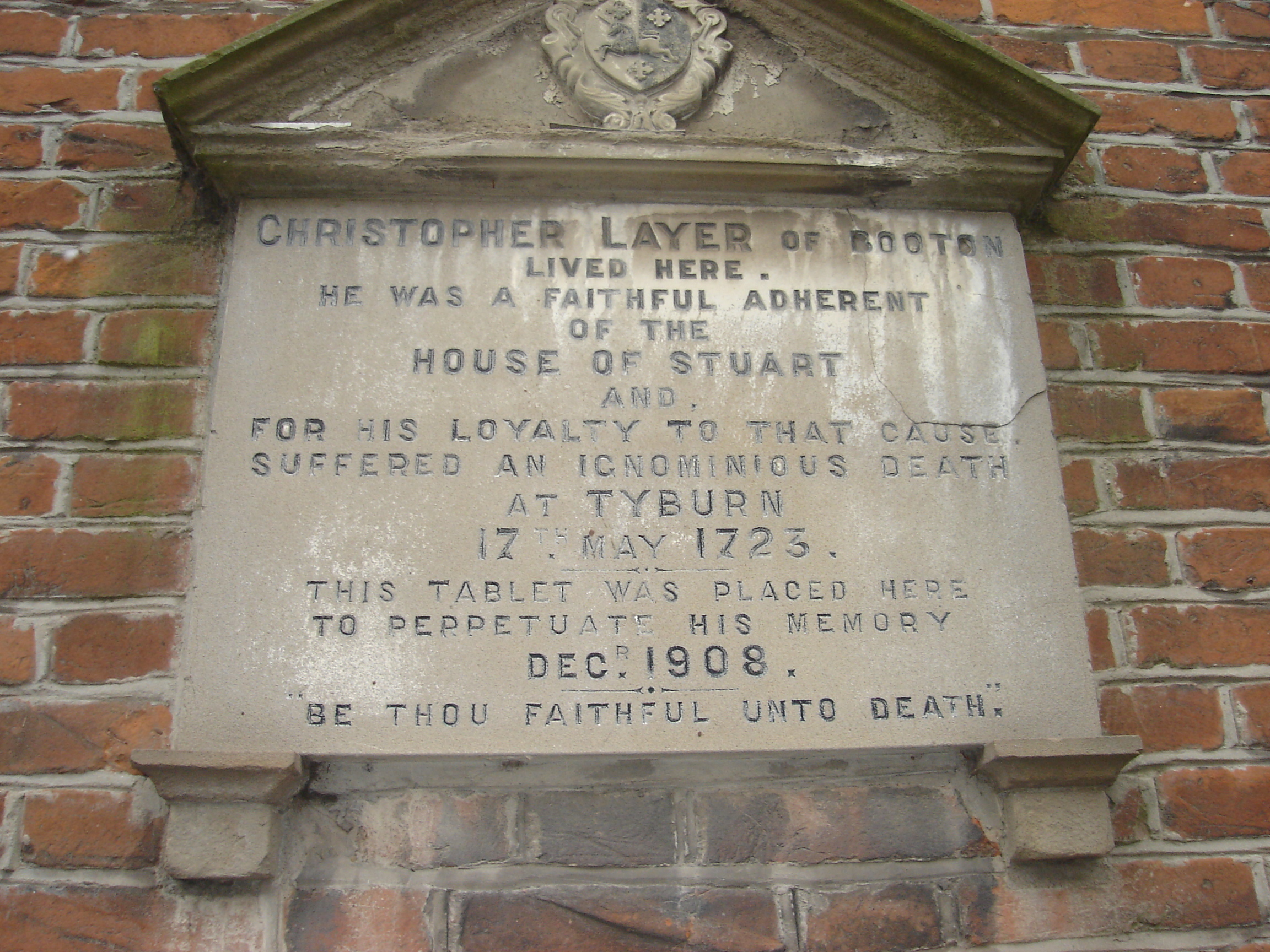
Aylsham, plaque to Christopher Layer

Layer's uncle, finding himself in difficulties, offered to make over to his nephew the remains of his estate, in exchange for cash and an annuity. Layer made the deal but refused to pay any part of the annuity. Soon after this he quarrelled with his master, went up to London, and qualified himself under Hadley Doyley, an attorney of Furnival's Inn. Returning to Norfolk, he obtained business, but then entered the Middle Temple, and was called to the bar.

== Jacobite plotter ==
Layer was an agent and legal advisor to the "notorious Jacobite" Lord North and Grey, and was reputed to be unscrupulous. His Jacobitism led him to hope to be made Lord Chancellor in the event of a restoration of the House of Stuart. He went to Rome in the summer of 1721, and there unfolded to the Old Pretender the details of a plot. He proposed to enlist broken soldiers, seize the Tower of London, the Royal Mint, the Bank of England, and other public buildings; also to secure the royal family, and murder the commander-in-chief and ministers.

Layer boasted of having a large and influential following. He did meet some confederates regularly at an inn in Stratford-le-Bow. He tried to entice soldiers at Romford and Leytonstone, and succeeded in enlisting a handful of malcontents. Layer used the house of one of his many mistresses; and compromising papers were left in the care of a brothel-keeper, Elizabeth Mason.

== Arrest and trial ==
In the end Layer was betrayed by two female friends and placed under arrest; he managed to escape, but was retaken after a chase the same evening and closely confined in the Tower of London. His clerks were placed under the surveillance of messengers, and his wife, Elizabeth Elwin of Aylesham, was brought to town from Dover in custody. The case was carried to the court of king's bench on 31 October 1722. Layer stumbled to the bar heavily fettered, and was compelled to stand, although ill.

The trial was opened on 21 November. The lord chief justice John Pratt ordered Layer's chains to be taken off. Among papers found in Elizabeth Mason's possession was one entitled the Scheme, sworn to be in Layer's writing: it gave instructions for the proposed insurrection. Proof was given that the Pretender and Layer were close, James and his wife having consented to stand by proxies (Lord North and Grey and the Duchess of Ormonde) godfather and godmother to Layer's daughter, at a ceremony privately performed at a china shop in Chelsea. Layer and his counsel argued in his defence; but, after a trial of eighteen hours, the jury unanimously found a verdict of guilty.

Sentence was not pronounced until the 27th. Layer, again in irons, pleaded in arrest of judgment, but was condemned to be hanged, drawn, and quartered. He was respited from time to time in the hope of disclosures, which he resolutely declined to make. Time was also granted him to arrange his law business. He was executed at Tyburn on 17 May 1723. There is an anecdote that Layer's head fell from the top of Temple Bar, where it had been placed, and was bought by a nonjuring attorney named Pearce; who resold it to Richard Rawlinson, the Jacobite antiquary. Rawlinson is further said to have kept the skull in his study and was buried with it in his right hand.
