= List of acts of the Parliament of Great Britain from 1799 =

This is a complete list of acts of the Parliament of Great Britain for the year 1799.

For acts passed until 1707, see the list of acts of the Parliament of England and the list of acts of the Parliament of Scotland. See also the list of acts of the Parliament of Ireland.

For acts passed from 1801 onwards, see the list of acts of the Parliament of the United Kingdom. For acts of the devolved parliaments and assemblies in the United Kingdom, see the list of acts of the Scottish Parliament, the list of acts of the Northern Ireland Assembly, and the list of acts and measures of Senedd Cymru; see also the list of acts of the Parliament of Northern Ireland.

The number shown after each act's title is its chapter number. Acts are cited using this number, preceded by the year(s) of the reign during which the relevant parliamentary session was held; thus the Union with Ireland Act 1800 is cited as "39 & 40 Geo. 3. c. 67", meaning the 67th act passed during the session that started in the 39th year of the reign of George III and which finished in the 40th year of that reign. Note that the modern convention is to use Arabic numerals in citations (thus "41 Geo. 3" rather than "41 Geo. III"). Acts of the last session of the Parliament of Great Britain and the first session of the Parliament of the United Kingdom are both cited as "41 Geo. 3".

Acts passed by the Parliament of Great Britain did not have a short title; however, some of these acts have subsequently been given a short title by acts of the Parliament of the United Kingdom (such as the Short Titles Act 1896).

From the session 38 Geo. 3 onwards, "public acts" were separated into "public general acts" and "public local and personal acts".

== 39 Geo. 3 ==
Continuing the third session of the 18th Parliament of Great Britain, which met from 20 November 1798 until 17 July 1799.

This session was also traditionally cited as 39 G. 3.

=== Public general acts ===
Short title	Citation	Royal assent
Long title
Armorial Bearings Act 1799 (repealed)	39 Geo. 3. c. 8	4 January 1799
An act for extending the time allowed for taking out certificates for using or wearing armorial bearings or ensigns, until the fifteenth day of February one thousand seven hundred and ninety-nine. (Repealed by Statute Law Revision Act 1871 (34 & 35 Vict. c. 116))
Negotiations of Notes and Bills Act 1799 (repealed)	39 Geo. 3. c. 9	4 January 1799
An act to continue, until the first day of February one thousand seven hundred and ninety-nine, an act made in the last session of parliament, chapter seven, (Note: Negotiation of Notes and Bills (No. 3) Act 1797 (38 Geo. 3. c. 7)) on the second day of December one thousand seven hundred and ninety-seven, intituled, "An act to continue, until the expiration of six weeks after the commencement of the next session of parliament, two several acts, passed in the session of parliament holden in the thirty-sixth and thirty-seventh years of his present Majesty, the one chapter thirty-two, (Note: Negotiation of Notes and Bills Act 1797 (37 Geo. 3. c. 32)) on the tenth day of March, and the other, chapter sixty-one, (Note: Negotiation of Notes and Bills (No. 2) Act 1797 (37 Geo. 3. c. 61)) on the twenty-fifth day of May, one thousand seven hundred and ninety-seven, for suspending for a limited time, the operation of certain acts, made in the fifteenth (Note: Negotiations of Notes and Bills Act 1775 (15 Geo. 3. c. 51)) and seventeenth (Note: Bills of Exchange Act 1776 (17 Geo. 3. c. 30)) years of the reign of his present Majesty, for restraining the negociation of promissory notes and bills of exchange, under a limited sum, within that part of Great Britain called England; and also to amend the said act, and further to continue the same, so amended, until the twenty-fifth day of March one thousand seven hundred and ninety-nine." (Repealed by Statute Law Revision Act 1871 (34 & 35 Vict. c. 116))
Issue of Bank Notes (Scotland) Act 1799 (repealed)	39 Geo. 3. c. 10	4 January 1799
An act to continue, until the twenty-fifth day of March one thousand seven hundred and ninety-nine, and amend an act, passed in the thirty-eighth year of the reign of his present Majesty, chapter two, (Note: Issue of Bank Notes (Scotland) Act 1797 (38 Geo. 3. c. 2)) videlicet, On the thirtieth day of November one thousand seven hundred and ninety-seven, intituled, "An act to continue, until the expiration of thirty days after the commencement of the next session of parliament, an act, passed in the session of parliament of the thirty-sixth and thirty-seventh years of his present Majesty, chapter one hundred and thirty-seven, (Note: Banks (Scotland) (No. 3) Act 1797 (37 Geo. 3. c. 137)) videlicet, On the twentieth of July one thousand seven hundred and ninety-seven, intituled, 'An act to continue an act, made in this present session of parliament, (Note: Banks (Scotland) (No. 2) Act 1797 (37 Geo. 3. c. 62)) intituled, "An act to revive and continue, for a limited time, and amend an act, passed in the present session of parliament, (Note: Banks (Scotland) Act 1797 (37 Geo. 3. c. 40)) intituled, "An act to allow the banks, and certain banking companies, in that part of Great Britain called Scotland, to issue notes for sums under a certain amount, for a limited time; and for indemnifying all persons who have issued notes for small sums of money in that part of the united kingdom," for a limited time.'" (Repealed by Statute Law Revision Act 1871 (34 & 35 Vict. c. 116))
Grenada and Saint Vincent Traders Act 1799 (repealed)	39 Geo. 3. c. 11	4 January 1799
An act for allowing further time for the payment of instalments to become due on certain sums advanced by way of loans, to certain persons connected with and trading to the islands of Grenada and St. Vincents. (Repealed by Statute Law Revision Act 1871 (34 & 35 Vict. c. 116))
Continuance of Laws Act 1799 (repealed)	39 Geo. 3. c. 12	4 January 1799
An act to continue, until the expiration of six weeks after the commencement of the next session of parliament, An act, passed in the thirty-fifth year of the reign of his present Majesty, chapter fifteen, (Note: Importation Act 1795 (35 Geo. 3. c. 15)) videlicet, On the sixteenth day of March one thousand seven hundred and nine-five; and also an act, passed in the same year, chapter eighty, (Note: Shipping Act 1795 (35 Geo. 3. c. 80)) videlicet, On the twenty-second day of May one thousand seven hundred and ninety-five; and also another act, passed in the thirty-sixth year of his present Majesty, chapter seven-six, (Note: Merchandise in Neutral Ships Act 1796 (36 Geo. 3. c. 76)) videlicet, relating to the admission of certain articles of merchandize in neutral ships, and the issuing of orders in council for that purpose; and to continue, for the same period, an act, passed in the session of parliament holden in the thirty-sixth and thirty-seventh years of his present Majesty, chapter twenty-one, (Note: Cape of Good Hope Trade Act 1796 (37 Geo. 3. c. 21)) videlicet, On the twenty-eighth day of December one thousand seven hundred and ninety-six, authorising his Majesty to make regulations respecting the trade and commerce to and from the Cape of Good Hope. (Repealed by Statute Law Revision Act 1871 (34 & 35 Vict. c. 116))
Duties on Income Act 1799 or the Income Tax Act 1799 (repealed)	39 Geo. 3. c. 13	9 January 1799
An act to repeal the duties imposed by an act, made in the last session of parliament, (Note: Taxation Act 1798 (38 Geo. 3. c. 16)) for granting an aid and contribution for the prosecution of the war; and to make more effectual provision for the like purpose, by granting certain duties upon income, in lieu of the said duties. (Repealed by Statute Law Revision Act 1861 (24 & 25 Vict. c. 101))
Supplementary Militia Act 1799 (repealed)	39 Geo. 3. c. 14	9 January 1799
An act for exempting, during the present war, certain persons, serving in volunteer corps, from being balloted for the supplementary militia, under certain conditions; and for making out new lists of men liable to serve in the said militia. (Repealed by Statute Law Revision Act 1871 (34 & 35 Vict. c. 116))
Habeas Corpus Suspension Act 1799 (repealed)	39 Geo. 3. c. 15	9 January 1799
An act to continue, until the twenty-first day of March one thousand seven hundred and ninety-nine, an act, made in the last session of parliament, intituled, "An act to empower his Majesty to secure and detain such persons as his Majesty shall suspect are conspiring against his person and government." (Note: Habeas Corpus Suspension Act 1798 (38 Geo. 3. c. 36)) (Repealed by Statute Law Revision Act 1871 (34 & 35 Vict. c. 116))
Courts (Newfoundland) Act 1799 (repealed)	39 Geo. 3. c. 16	9 January 1799
An act to revive and continue, until thirty days after the commencement of the next session of parliament, An act, passed in the thirty-third year of the reign of his present Majesty, chapter seventy-six, (Note: Courts (Newfoundland) Act 1793 (33 Geo. 3. c. 76)) videlicet, On the seventeenth day of June one thousand seven hundred and ninety-three, intitled, "An act for establishing courts of judicature in the island of Newfoundland, and the islands adjacent. (Repealed by Statute Law Revision Act 1871 (34 & 35 Vict. c. 116))
Indemnity Act 1799 (repealed)	39 Geo. 3. c. 17	9 January 1799
An act to indemnify such persons as have omitted to qualify themselves for offices and employments, and to indemnify justices of the peace or others, who have omitted to register or deliver in their qualifications within the time directed by law, and for extending the time limited for those purposes, until the twenty-fifth day of December one thousand seven hundred and ninety-nine; to indemnify members and officers, in cities, corporations, and borough towns, whose admissions have been omitted to be stamped according to law, or having been stamped, have been lost or mislaid, and for allowing them, until the twenty-fifth day of December one thousand seven hundred and ninety-nine, to provide admissions duly stamped; to permit such persons as have omitted to make and file affidavits of the execution of indentures of clerks to attornies and solicitors, to make and file the same on or before the first day of Michaelmas term one thousand seven hundred and ninety-nine; to allow such persons who have omitted to pay the duties on the indentures and contracts of clerks, apprentices, or servants, until the twenty-second day of June one thousand seven hundred and ninety-nine for payment of the same; to indemnify attornies who have omitted to enter their certificates according to law, and for allowing them until the first day of Easter term, to enter the same with the proper officer; and for indemnifying deputy lieutenants and officers of the militia, who have neglected to transmit descriptions of the qualifications to the clerks of the peace within the time directed by law, and for extending the time limited for that purposes, until the first day of September one thousand seven hundred and ninety-nine. (Repealed by Promissory Oaths Act 1871 (34 & 35 Vict. c. 48))
Loans or Exchequer Bills Act 1799 (repealed)	39 Geo. 3. c. 18	7 March 1799
An act for raising a certain sum of money, by loans or exchequer bills, for the service of the year one thousand seven hundred and nine-nine. (Repealed by Statute Law Revision Act 1871 (34 & 35 Vict. c. 116))
Marine Mutiny Act 1799 (repealed)	39 Geo. 3. c. 19	21 March 1799
An act for the regulation of his Majesty's marine forces while on shore, until the twenty-fifth day or March one thousand eight hundred. (Repealed by Statute Law Revision Act 1871 (34 & 35 Vict. c. 116))
Mutiny Act 1799 (repealed)	39 Geo. 3. c. 20	21 March 1799
An act for punishing mutiny and desertion; and for the payment of the army and their quarters. (Repealed by Statute Law Revision Act 1871 (34 & 35 Vict. c. 116))
Land Tax Redemption Act 1799 (repealed)	39 Geo. 3. c. 21	21 March 1799
An act to amend and render more effectual two acts, passed in the thirty-eighth year of his present Majesty's reign (Note: Land Tax Perpetuation Act 1798 (38 Geo. 3. c. 60)) and the present session of parliament (Note: Land Tax Redemption, etc. Act 1798 (39 Geo. 3. c. 6)) for the redemption of the land tax. (Repealed by Land Tax Redemption Act 1802 (42 Geo. 3. c. 116))
Duties on Income (No. 2) Act 1799 (repealed)	39 Geo. 3. c. 22	21 March 1799
An act for extending the time for returning statements under an act, passed in the present session of parliament, intituled, "An act to repeal the duties imposed by an act, made in the last session of parliament, for granting an aid and contribution for the prosecution of the war; and to make more effectual provision for the like purpose, by granting certain duties upon income, in lieu of the said duties;" (Note: Duties on Income Act 1799 (39 Geo. 3. c. 13)) and to amend the said act. (Repealed by Statute Law Revision Act 1861 (24 & 25 Vict. c. 101))
Provisional Cavalry Act 1799 (repealed)	39 Geo. 3. c. 23	21 March 1799
An act to repeal certain parts of three acts, made in the thirty-seventh (Note: Provisional Cavalry Act 1797 (37 Geo. 3. c. 139)) and thirty-eighth (Note: Provisional Cavalry Act 1798 (38 Geo. 3. c. 94)) years of the reign of his present Majesty, for raising a provincial force of cavalry; and for making further provision respecting such part of the provisional cavalry of the kingdom as is now actually called out and embodied. (Repealed by Statute Law Revision Act 1871 (34 & 35 Vict. c. 116))
Negotiations of Notes and Bills (No. 2) Act 1799 (repealed)	39 Geo. 3. c. 24	21 March 1799
An act to continue, until the twenty-fifth day of May next, an act made in the thirty-ninth year of the reign of his present Majesty, chapter nine, (Note: Negotiations of Notes and Bills Act 1799 (39 Geo. 3. c. 9)) videlicet, On the fourth day of January one thousand seven hundred and ninety-nine, for continuing several acts, made in the thirty-sixth, thirty-seventh, and thirty-eighth years of the reign of his present Majesty, for suspending the operation of certain acts made in the fifteenth and seventeenth years of the reign of his present Majesty, for restraining the negociation of promissory notes and bills of exchange, under a limited sum, within that part of Great Britain called England. (Repealed by Statute Law Revision Act 1871 (34 & 35 Vict. c. 116))
Issue of Bank Notes (Scotland) (No. 2) Act 1799 (repealed)	39 Geo. 3. c. 25	21 March 1799
An act to continue, until the twenty-fifth day of May next, an act, passed in the thirty-ninth year of the reign of his present Majesty, chapter ten, (Note: Issue of Bank Notes (Scotland) Act 1799 (39 Geo. 3. c. 10)) videlicet, On the fourth day of January one thousand seven hundred and ninety-nine, for continuing several acts for allowing the banks, and certain banking companies, in that part of Great Britain called Scotland, to issue notes for sums under a certain amount. (Repealed by Statute Law Revision Act 1871 (34 & 35 Vict. c. 116))
Exportation Act 1799 (repealed)	39 Geo. 3. c. 26	21 March 1799
An act to continue, until the twenty-fifth day of March one thousand eight hundred, an act, passed in the session of parliament holden in the thirty-sixth and thirty-seventh year of his present Majesty, chapter seventy-six, (Note: Bounty on Exportation Act 1797 (37 Geo. 3. c. 76)) videlicet, On the sixth day of June one thousand seven hundred and ninety-seven, for disallowing the bounty on the exportation to Ireland of sail cloth or canvas of the manufacture of Great Britain. (Repealed by Statute Law Revision Act 1871 (34 & 35 Vict. c. 116))
Importation Act 1799 (repealed)	39 Geo. 3. c. 27	21 March 1799
An act to revive and continue, until the twenty-fifth day of March one thousand eight hundred, an act, passed in the session of parliament of the thirty-sixth and thirty-seventh years of his present Majesty, chapter seventy-two, (Note: Importation Act 1797 (37 Geo. 3. c. 72)) videlicet, On the sixth of June one thousand seven hundred and ninety-seven, for prohibiting the importation of cambricks and French lawns into this kingdom, not being of the manufacture of Ireland, except for the purpose of being warehoused for exportation. (Repealed by Statute Law Revision Act 1871 (34 & 35 Vict. c. 116))
Bounty on Certain Linens Exported Act 1799 (repealed)	39 Geo. 3. c. 28	21 March 1799
An act to continue, until the twenty-fourth day of Jane one thousand eight hundred, an act, made in the twenty-ninth year of the reign of his late Majesty King George the Second, chapter fifteen, (Note: Exportation Act 1756 (29 Geo. 2. c. 15)) videlicet, On the thirteenth day of November one thousand seven hundred and fifty-five, for granting a bounty on certain species of British and Irish linens exported; and taking off the duties on the importation of foreign raw linen yarns mads of flax. (Repealed by Statute Law Revision Act 1871 (34 & 35 Vict. c. 116))
Annuities Act 1799 (repealed)	39 Geo. 3. c. 29	21 March 1799
An act for enabling his Majesty to settle an annuity of twelve thousand pounds on his royal highness prince Edward, and a like annuity of twelve thousand pounds on his royal highness prince Ernest Augustus, during his Majesty's pleasure. (Repealed by Statute Law Revision Act 1871 (34 & 35 Vict. c. 116))
Annuities (No. 2) Act 1799 (repealed)	39 Geo. 3. c. 30	21 March 1799
An act to enable his Majesty to settle on her royal highness the princess Amelia, part of the annuity of thirty thousand pounds per annum, which his Majesty was enabled to settle on their royal highnesses his Majesty's other daughters, out of the hereditary revenues, by virtue of act passed in the eighteenth year of the reign of his present Majesty. (Note: Settlement on Royal Princes, etc. Act 1778 (18 Geo. 3. c. 31)) (Repealed by Statute Law Revision Act 1871 (34 & 35 Vict. c. 116))
Duties on Distilleries Act 1799 (repealed)	39 Geo. 3. c. 31	10 April 1799
An act to continue, until the tenth day of July one thousand seven hundred and ninety-nine, and amend an act passed in the last session of parliament, chapter ninety-two, (Note: Scotch Distilleries Act 1798 (38 Geo. 3. c. 92)) videlicet, On the twenty-ninth day of June one thousand seven hundred and ninety-eight, for granting to his Majesty additional duties on distilleries in the several parts of the highlands of Scotland, for a limited time, and for regulating the duties on distilleries in the respective districts in Scotland; and for granting to his Majesty certain additional duties on spirits distilled for consumption, and a duty on unmalted grain used in distillation in Scotland. (Repealed by Statute Law Revision Act 1871 (34 & 35 Vict. c. 116))
Shipping Act 1799 (repealed)	39 Geo. 3. c. 32	10 April 1799
An act to permit ships to sail from certain ports of the island of Newfoundland, and from the coast of Labrador, without convoy. (Repealed by Statute Law Revision Act 1871 (34 & 35 Vict. c. 116))
Loans or Exchequer Bills (No. 2) Act 1799 (repealed)	39 Geo. 3. c. 33	19 April 1799
An act for raising a further sum of money, by loans or exchequer bills for the service of the year one thousand seven hundred and ninety-nine. (Repealed by Statute Law Revision Act 1871 (34 & 35 Vict. c. 116))
Partridges Act 1799 (repealed)	39 Geo. 3. c. 34	19 April 1799
An act for repealing two acts, passed in the thirty-sixth (Note: Game Act 1796 (36 Geo. 3. c. 39)) (Note: Game (Scotland) Act 1796 (36 Geo. 3. c. 54)) year of the reign of his present Majesty, which limit the time for killing partridges in England and Scotland; and for amending so much of an act, passed in the second year of the reign of his present Majesty, (Note: Game Act 1762 (2 Geo. 3. c. 19)) as relates to such limitation within that part of Great Britain called England, by making other provisions for that purpose. (Repealed for England and Wales by Game Act 1831 (1 & 2 Will. 4. c. 32) and for Scotland by Statute Law (Repeals) Act 1978 (c. 45))
Militia Act 1799 (repealed)	39 Geo. 3. c. 35	10 May 1799
An act for exempting, during the present war, persons, serving in volunteer corps, and associations, from being balloted for the militia, under certain conditions. (Repealed by Statute Law Revision Act 1871 (34 & 35 Vict. c. 116))
Quartering of Soldiers Act 1799 (repealed)	39 Geo. 3. c. 36	10 May 1799
An act for increasing the rates of subsistence to be paid to innkeepers and others on quartering soldiers. (Repealed by Statute Law Revision Act 1871 (34 & 35 Vict. c. 116))
Offences at Sea Act 1799	39 Geo. 3. c. 37	10 May 1799
An Act for remedying certain Defects in the Law respecting Offences committed upon the High Seas.
Continuance of Laws (No. 2) Act 1799 (repealed)	39 Geo. 3. c. 38	10 May 1799
An act to continue, until the twenty-fourth day of June one thousand eight hundred and four, and amend an act, made in the thirty-fifth year of the reign of his present Majesty, (Note: Importation (No. 4) Act 1795 (35 Geo. 3. c. 117)) for allowing the importation of rape seed, and other seeds used for extracting oil, whenever the prices of middling British rape seed shall be above a certain limit; and to continue several laws relating to the allowing the importation of seal skins cured with foreign salt, free of duty, until the twenty-fourth day of June one thousand eight hundred and four; to the more effectual encouragement of the manufactures of flax and cotton in Great Britain, until the twenty-fourth day of June one thousand eight hundred and three; and so much of an act, made in the thirty-fifth year of the reign of his present Majesty, (Note: Duties on Glass Act 1795 (35 Geo. 3. c. 114)) for better securing the duties on glass, as was to continue in force for a limited time, until the fifth day of June one thousand eight hundred. (Repealed by Statute Law Revision Act 1861 (24 & 25 Vict. c. 101))
Stamps Act 1799 (repealed)	39 Geo. 3. c. 39	10 May 1799
An act to amend an act made in the thirty-fourth year of the reign of his present Majesty, intituled, "An act for granting to his Majesty certain stamp duties on indentures of clerkships to solicitors and attornies, in any of the courts in England, therein mentioned." (Note: Stamps (No. 3) Act 1794 (34 Geo. 3. c. 14)) (Repealed by Statute Law Revision Act 1871 (34 & 35 Vict. c. 116))
Land Tax Redemption (No. 2) Act 1799 (repealed)	39 Geo. 3. c. 40	10 May 1799
An act to amend so much of three acts, made in the last (Note: Land Tax Perpetuation Act 1798 (38 Geo. 3. c. 60)) and present (Note: Land Tax Redemption, etc. Act 1798 (39 Geo. 3. c. 6)) sessions of parliament, for making perpetual, subject to redemption and purchase, the several sums of money charged as a land tax, as relates to that part of Great Britain called Scotland. (Repealed by Land Tax Redemption Act 1802 (42 Geo. 3. c. 116))
Loans or Exchequer Bills (No. 3) Act 1799 (repealed)	39 Geo. 3. c. 41	10 May 1799
An act for raising an additional sum of money, by loans or exchequer bills, for the service of the year one thousand seven hundred and ninety-nine. (Repealed by Statute Law Revision Act 1871 (34 & 35 Vict. c. 116))
Duties on Income (No. 3) Act 1799 (repealed)	39 Geo. 3. c. 42	10 May 1799
An act to enable the commercial commissioners appointed to carry into execution certain acts for granting duties upon income, to extend the time limited by the said acts for receiving returns of income; and for explaining and extending the said acts. (Repealed by Statute Law Revision Act 1861 (24 & 25 Vict. c. 101))
Land Tax Redemption (No. 3) Act 1799 (repealed)	39 Geo. 3. c. 43	10 May 1799
An act for enlarging the time limited by certain acts passed for the redemption of the land tax, for receiving contracts and making transfers of stock thereon, and for explaining and amending the said acts. (Repealed by Land Tax Redemption Act 1802 (42 Geo. 3. c. 116))
Habeas Corpus Suspension (No. 2) Act 1799 (repealed)	39 Geo. 3. c. 44	20 May 1799
An act for further continuing, until the first day of March one thousand, eight hundred, an act, made in the last session of parliament, intituled, "An act to empower his Majesty to secure and detain such persons as his Majesty shall suspect are conspiring against his person and government." (Note: Habeas Corpus Suspension Act 1798 (38 Geo. 3. c. 36)) (Repealed by Statute Law Revision Act 1871 (34 & 35 Vict. c. 116))
Punishment of Burning in the Hand Act 1799 (repealed)	39 Geo. 3. c. 45	20 May 1799
An Act for making perpetual so much of an Act made in the nineteenth Year of the Reign of His present Majesty, Chapter Seventy-four, videlicet, on the twenty-sixth Day of November on thousand seven hundred and seventy-eight, intituled, "An Act to explain and amend the Laws relating to the Transportation, Imprisonment, and other Punishment of certain Offenders," (Note: Penitentiary Act 1779 (19 Geo. 3. c. 74)) as relates to the Punishment of burning in the Hand of certain Persons convicted of Felony with the Benefit of Clergy. (Repealed by Statute Law Revision Act 1861 (24 & 25 Vict. c. 101))
Lodgings of Justices of Assize Act 1799 (repealed)	39 Geo. 3. c. 46	20 May 1799
An Act for making perpetual so much of an Act made in the nineteenth Year of the Reign of His present Majesty, Chapter Seventy-four, videlicet, on the twenty-sixth Day of November on thousand seven hundred and seventy-eight, intituled, "An Act to explain and amend the Laws relating to the Transportation, Imprisonment, and other Punishment of certain Offenders," as relates to the Lodgings of Judges at County Assizes. (Repealed by Statute Law Revision Act 1871 (34 & 35 Vict. c. 116))
Negotiation of Notes and Bills (No. 3) Act 1799 (repealed)	39 Geo. 3. c. 47	13 June 1799
An act to continue, until the fifth day of July next, an act, made is the present session of parliament, chapter twenty-four, (Note: Negotiations of Notes and Bills (No. 2) Act 1799 (39 Geo. 3. c. 24)) videlicet, On the twenty-first day of March one thousand seven hundred and ninety-nine, for continuing several acts, made in the thirty-fifth, and thirty-seventh, and in the thirty-eighth, years of the reign of his present Majesty, for suspending the operation of certain acts, made in the fifteenth, and seventeenth, yean of the reign of his present Majesty, for restraining the negociation of promissory notes, and bills of exchange, under a limited sum, within that part of Great Britain, called England. (Repealed by Statute Law Revision Act 1871 (34 & 35 Vict. c. 116))
Issue of Bank Notes (Scotland) (No. 3) Act 1799 (repealed)	39 Geo. 3. c. 48	13 June 1799
An act to continue, until the fifth day of July one thousand seven hundred and ninety-nine, an act, passed in the present session of parliament, (Note: Issue of Bank Notes (Scotland) (No. 2) Act 1799 (39 Geo. 3. c. 26 ?)) for continuing several acts for allowing the banks, and certain banking companies, in that part of Great Britain called Scotland, to issue notes for sums under a certain amount. (Repealed by Statute Law Revision Act 1871 (34 & 35 Vict. c. 116))
Bail in Criminal Cases (Scotland) Act 1799 (repealed)	39 Geo. 3. c. 49	13 June 1799
An act to extend the bail to be given in cases of criminal information in that part of Great Britain called Scotland. (Repealed by Bail (Scotland) Act 1888 (51 & 52 Vict. c. 36))
Relief of Debtors Act 1799 (repealed)	39 Geo. 3. c. 50	13 June 1799
An act for making perpetual an act, made in the thirty-third year of the reign of his present Majesty, intituled, "An act for the further relief of debtors, with respect to the imprisonment of their persons; and to oblige debtors, who shall continue in execution in prison beyond a certain time, and for sums not exceeding what are mentioned in the act, to make discovery, and deliver, upon oath, their estates for their creditors' benefit." (Note: Debtors Relief Act 1793 (33 Geo. 3. c. 5)) (Repealed by Statute Law Revision Act 1871 (34 & 35 Vict. c. 116))
Transportation, etc. Act 1799 (repealed)	39 Geo. 3. c. 51	13 June 1799
An act for continuing, until the twenty-fifth day of March one thousand eight hundred and two, several laws relating to the transportation of felons and other offenders, and to the authorising the removal of offenders to temporary places of confinement in England and Scotland respectively. (Repealed by Statute Law Revision Act 1871 (34 & 35 Vict. c. 116))
Penitentiary Houses Act 1799 (repealed)	39 Geo. 3. c. 52	13 June 1799
An act for continuing, until the twenty-fifth day of March one thousand eight hundred and two, so much of an act, made in the nineteenth year of the reign of his present Majesty, chapter seventy-four, videlicet, On the twenty-fifth day of November one thousand seven hundred and seventy-eight, intituled, "An act to explain and amend the laws relating to the transportation, imprisonment and other punishment, of certain offenders," as relates to penitentiary houses. (Repealed by Statute Law Revision Act 1871 (34 & 35 Vict. c. 116))
Payment of Creditors (Scotland) Act 1799 (repealed)	39 Geo. 3. c. 53	13 June 1799
An act to continue, until the twenty-first day of March one thousand eight hundred and four, so much or an act, made in the twenty-third year of the reign of his present Majesty, (Note: Payment of Creditors (Scotland) Act 1783 (23 Geo. 3. c. 18)) for rendering the payment of creditors more equal and expeditious in that part of Great Britain called Scotland. (Repealed by Statute Law Revision Act 1871 (34 & 35 Vict. c. 116))
Tanners' Indemnity, etc. Act 1799 (repealed)	39 Geo. 3. c. 54	13 June 1799
An act to indemnify all persons who may have incurred penalties or forfeitures under an act passed in the second year of the reign of King James the First, intituled, "An act concerning tanners, curriers, shoemakers, and other artificers occupying the cutting of leather;" (Note: Leather Act 1603 (1 Jas. 1. c. 22)) and to repeal parts of the said act relating to the buying of hides. (Repealed by Statute Law Revision Act 1871 (34 & 35 Vict. c. 116))
Thirlage Act 1799 (repealed)	39 Geo. 3. c. 55	13 June 1799
An Act for encouraging the improvement of lands subject to the servitude of thirlage in that part of Great Britain called Scotland. (Repealed by Abolition of Feudal Tenure etc. (Scotland) Act 2000 (asp 5))
Colliers (Scotland) Act 1799 (repealed)	39 Geo. 3. c. 56	13 June 1799
An act to explain and amend the laws relative to colliers in that part of Great Britain called Scotland. (Repealed by Statute Law Revision Act 1871 (34 & 35 Vict. c. 116) and Statute Law Revision Act 1948 (11 & 12 Geo. 6. c. 62))
Indemnity to Governors of West Indies Act 1799 (repealed)	39 Geo. 3. c. 57	13 June 1799
An act for indemnifying governors, lieutenant governors, and persons acting as such, in the West India islands, who have permitted the importation and exportation of goods and commodities in foreign bottoms. (Repealed by Statute Law Revision Act 1871 (34 & 35 Vict. c. 116))
Annuity to Sir James Marriott Act 1799 (repealed)	39 Geo. 3. c. 58	13 June 1799
An act to enable his Majesty to grant a certain annuity to Sir James Marriott knight, late judge of the high court of admiralty, in consideration of his diligent and faithful services in the execution of that office. (Repealed by Statute Law Revision Act 1871 (34 & 35 Vict. c. 116))
Warehousing of Goods Act 1799 (repealed)	39 Geo. 3. c. 59	13 June 1799
An act for permitting certain goods, imported from the East Indies, to be warehoused; and for repealing the duties now payable thereon and granting other duties in lieu thereof. (Repealed by Customs Law Repeal Act 1825 (6 Geo. 4. c. 105))
National Debt Act 1799 (repealed)	39 Geo. 3. c. 60	21 June 1799
An act for raising the sum of fifteen millions five hundred thousand pounds by way of annuities. (Repealed by Statute Law Revision Act 1870 (33 & 34 Vict. c. 69))
Customs Act 1799 (repealed)	39 Geo. 3. c. 61	21 June 1799
An act to repeal the duty granted by an act of the last session of parliament (Note: Customs, etc. Act 1798 (38 Geo. 3. c. 76)) on raw linen yarn, the produce of the territories of the king of Prussia; and imported directly from thence into this kingdom, and for charging another duty in lieu thereof. (Repealed by Statute Law Revision Act 1871 (34 & 35 Vict. c. 116))
Militia (No. 2) Act 1799 (repealed)	39 Geo. 3. c. 62	21 June 1799
An act to amend an act made in the thirty-seventh year of the reign of his present Majesty, (Note: Militia Act 1797 (37 Geo. 3. c. 103)) and two acts made in the last session of parliament, (Note: Militia (No. 2) Act 1797 (38 Geo. 3. c. 12)) (Note: Militia (No. 2) Act 1798 (38 Geo. 3. c. 44)) for raising a militia force in that part of the kingdom of Great Britain called Scotland. (Repealed by Statute Law Revision Act 1871 (34 & 35 Vict. c. 116))
Duties on Sugar, etc. Act 1799 (repealed)	39 Geo. 3. c. 63	1 July 1799
An act for granting to his Majesty certain additional duties on sugar imported and exported, and on coffee exported; and for reducing the drawbacks now allowed on the exportation of sugar. (Repealed by Statute Law Revision Act 1861 (24 & 25 Vict. c. 101))
National Debt (No. 2) Act 1799 (repealed)	39 Geo. 3. c. 64	1 July 1799
An act for granting to his Majesty the sum of two hundred thousand pounds to be issued and paid to the governor and company of the bank of England, to be by them placed to the account of the commissioners for the reduction of the national debt. (Repealed by Statute Law Revision Act 1861 (24 & 25 Vict. c. 101))
Bounty on Pilchards Act 1799 (repealed)	39 Geo. 3. c. 65	1 July 1799
An act for allowing, until the twenty-fifth day of June one thousand eight hundred and five, a further bounty upon pilchards exported; and for amending an act made in the thirty-eighth year of the reign of his present Majesty, (Note: Salt Duties Act 1798 (38 Geo. 3. c. 89)) for transferring the management of the salt duties to the commissioners of excise. (Repealed by Statute Law Revision Act 1861 (24 & 25 Vict. c. 101))
Sheriff Deputies, etc. (Scotland) Act 1799 (repealed)	39 Geo. 3. c. 66	1 July 1799
An act for placing the salaries of the sheriff deputes and substitutes of Scotland, upon the Scots civil list establishment. (Repealed by Statute Law Revision Act 1871 (34 & 35 Vict. c. 116))
Courts of Exchequer Act 1799 (repealed)	39 Geo. 3. c. 67	1 July 1799
An act to enable such person as his Majesty shall please to appoint to the vacant office of a baron of the exchequer, to take upon himself the degree of a serjeant at law. (Repealed by Statute Law Revision Act 1871 (34 & 35 Vict. c. 116))
Loans or Exchequer Bills (No. 4) Act 1799 (repealed)	39 Geo. 3. c. 68	12 July 1799
An act to enable his Majesty to raise the sum of three millions, for the uses and purposes therein mentioned. (Repealed by Statute Law Revision Act 1871 (34 & 35 Vict. c. 116))
Loans or Exchequer Bills (No. 5) Act 1799 (repealed)	39 Geo. 3. c. 69	12 July 1799
An act for raising the sum of three millions five hundred thousand pounds, by loans or exchequer bills, for the service of the year one thousand seven hundred and ninety nine. (Repealed by Statute Law Revision Act 1871 (34 & 35 Vict. c. 116))
Loans or Exchequer Bills (No. 6) Act 1799 (repealed)	39 Geo. 3. c. 70	12 July 1799
An act for raising the sum of three millions, by loans or exchequer bills, for the service of the year one thousand seven hundred and ninety-nine. (Repealed by Statute Law Revision Act 1871 (34 & 35 Vict. c. 116))
Loans or Exchequer Bills (No. 7) Act 1799 (repealed)	39 Geo. 3. c. 71	12 July 1799
An act to enable the lords commissioners of his Majesty's treasury to issue exchequer bills to a limited amount, on the credit of such monies as shall arise by virtue of an act of this session, for granting certain duties on income. (Repealed by Statute Law Revision Act 1871 (34 & 35 Vict. c. 116))
Duties on Income (No. 4) Act 1799 (repealed)	39 Geo. 3. c. 72	12 July 1799
An act to amend an act made in this present session of parliament, intituled, "An act to repeal the duties imposed by an act, made in the last session of parliament, for granting an aid and contribution for the prosecution of the war; and to make more effectual provision for the like purpose, by granting certain duties upon income, in lieu of the said duties," so far as relates to the assessments made upon trustees, agents, receivers, and guardians. (Repealed by Statute Law Revision Act 1861 (24 & 25 Vict. c. 101))
Legacy Duty Act 1799 (repealed)	39 Geo. 3. c. 73	12 July 1799
An act for exempting certain specifick legacies which shall be given to bodies corporate, or other publick bodies, from the payment of duty; and also the legacy of books and other articles given by the will of the late reverend Clayton Mordaunt Cracherode to the trustees of the British museum. (Repealed by Finance Act 1949 (12, 13 & 14 Geo. 6. c. 47))
Post Horse Duties Act 1799 (repealed)	39 Geo. 3. c. 74	12 July 1799
An act for further continuing until the first day of February one thousand eight hundred and three, an act, made in the twenty-seventh year of the reign of his present Majesty, intituled, "An act to enable the lord high treasurer, or commissioners of the treasury for the time being, to let the farm duties granted by an act, made in the twenty-fifth year of his present Majesty's reign, (Note: Duties on Post Horses, etc. Act 1785 (25 Geo. 3. c. 51)) on horses let to hire for travelling post, and by time, to such persons as should be willing to contract for the same." (Note: Post Horse Duties Act 1787 (27 Geo. 3. c. 26)) (Repealed by Statute Law Revision Act 1871 (34 & 35 Vict. c. 116))
Importation (No. 2) Act 1799 (repealed)	39 Geo. 3. c. 75	12 July 1799
An act for reviving and making perpetual an act made in the fourteenth year of the reign of his present Majesty, intituled, "An act to prohibit the importation of light silver coin of this realm from foreign counties into Great Britain or Ireland; and to restrain the tender thereof beyond a certain sum." (Note: Light Silver Coin Act 1774 (14 Geo. 3. c. 42)) (Repealed by Statute Law Revision Act 1861 (24 & 25 Vict. c. 101))
Postage Act 1799 (repealed)	39 Geo. 3. c. 76	12 July 1799
An act for the more secure conveyance of ship letters, and for granting to his Majesty certain rates of postage thereon. (Repealed by Post Office (Repeal of Laws) Act 1837 (7 Will. 4 & 1 Vict. c. 32))
Salt Duties Act 1799 (repealed)	39 Geo. 3. c. 77	12 July 1799
An act for repealing the duties on salt made in Scotland, and on salt imported from Scotland into England and Wales, and granting other duties in lieu thereof. (Repealed by Statute Law Revision Act 1861 (24 & 25 Vict. c. 101))
Duties on Distilleries (Scotland) Act 1799 (repealed)	39 Geo. 3. c. 78	12 July 1799
An act to continue, until the tenth day or November one thousand eight hundred, and amend an act, passed in the present session of parliament, (Note: Duties on Distilleries Act 1799 (39 Geo. 3. c. 31)) for continuing an act of the last session of parliament, for granting to his Majesty additional duties on distilleries, in the several parts of the highlands of Scotland, for a limited time; and for regulating the duties on distilleries in the respective districts of Scotland; and for granting to his Majesty certain additional duties on spirits distilled for consumption, and a duty on unmalted grain used in distillation in Scotland. (Repealed by Statute Law Revision Act 1861 (24 & 25 Vict. c. 101))
Unlawful Societies Act 1799 or the Corresponding Societies Act 1799 (repealed)	39 Geo. 3. c. 79	12 July 1799
An act for the more effectual suppression of societies established for seditious and treasonable purposes; and for better preventing treasonable and seditions practices. (Repealed by Newspapers, Printers, and Reading Rooms Repeal Act 1869 (32 & 33 Vict. c. 24), Statute Law Revision Act 1871 (34 & 35 Vict. c. 116), Statute Law Revision Act 1888 (51 & 52 Vict. c. 3), Public Authorities Protection Act 1893 (56 & 57 Vict. c. 61), Statute Law Revision Act 1948 (11 & 12 Geo. 6. c. 62) and Criminal Law Act 1967 (c. 58))
Slave Trade Act 1799 (repealed)	39 Geo. 3. c. 80	12 July 1799
An act for better regulating the manner of carrying slaves, in British vessels, from the coast of Africa. (Repealed by Statute Law Revision Act 1861 (24 & 25 Vict. c. 101))
Unlawful Combinations of Workmen Act 1799 or the Combination Act 1799 (repealed)	39 Geo. 3. c. 81	12 July 1799
An Act to prevent Unlawful Combinations of Workmen, prohibited trade unions and collective bargaining by British workers. (Repealed by Unlawful Combinations of Workmen Act 1800 (39 & 40 Geo. 3. c. 106))
Militia of City of London Act 1799 (repealed)	39 Geo. 3. c. 82	12 July 1799
An act to explain and amend an act, passed in the thirty-sixth year of the reign of his present Majesty, (Note: London Militia Act 1796 (36 Geo. 3. c. 92)) intitled, "An act for amending, and reducing in one act of parliament, two several acts, passed in the thirty-fourth (Note: City of London Militia Act 1794 (34 Geo. 3. c. 81)) and thirty-fifth (Note: City of London Militia Act 1795 (35 Geo. 3. c. 27)) years of the reign of his present Majesty, for the better ordering the militia of the city of London, and for the further regulating the trained bands or militia of the said city." (Repealed by Militia (City of London) Act 1820 (1 Geo. 4. c. 100))
Auditors of Land Revenue Act 1799 (repealed)	39 Geo. 3. c. 83	12 July 1799
An act for transferring to the commissioners for auditing the publick accounts, the duties now performed by the offices of the auditors of the land revenue; and for directing the mode of attesting the accounts of the paymaster general of his Majesty's forces. (Repealed by Statute Law Revision Act 1861 (24 & 25 Vict. c. 101))
Annuity (Heirs of Sir Thomas Clarges) Act 1799 (repealed)	39 Geo. 3. c. 84	12 July 1799
An act to enable the lords commissioners of the treasury to contract with the most noble Charles duke of Richmond, for the absolute purchase of the property of the said duke, and all others interested in a certain duty of twelve pence per chaldron on coals shipped in the river Tyne to be consumed in England, and to grant a compensation for the same, by way of annuity payable out of the consolidated fund. (Repealed by Statute Law Revision (No. 2) Act 1893 (56 & 57 Vict. c. 54))
Embezzlement Act 1799 (repealed)	39 Geo. 3. c. 85	12 July 1799
An act to protect masters against embezzlements by their clerks or servants. (Repealed by Statute Law Revision Act 1861 (24 & 25 Vict. c. 101))
Spirit Licences Act 1799 (repealed)	39 Geo. 3. c. 86	12 July 1799
An act for ascertaining the rate of duty to be paid for retail spirit licences; and for authorising the justices of the peace for any county to grant licences to sell ale, beer, or other liquors, by retail, in cities and places where a sufficient number of magistrates cannot be found qualified to grant such licences. (Repealed by Alehouse Act 1828 (9 Geo. 4. c. 61))
Importation (No. 3) Act 1799 (repealed)	39 Geo. 3. c. 87	12 July 1799
An act for enabling his Majesty, to prohibit the exportation, and permit the importation, of corn, and for allowing the importation of other articles of provision, without payment of duty, to continue in force until six weeks from the commencement of the next session of parliament. (Repealed by Statute Law Revision Act 1871 (34 & 35 Vict. c. 116))
Importation and Exportation Act 1799 (repealed)	39 Geo. 3. c. 88	12 July 1799
An Act for erecting the county of Edinburgh into a separate district, for the purpose of regulating the importation and exportation of corn. (Repealed by Statute Law Revision Act 1871 (34 & 35 Vict. c. 116))
East India Company Act 1799 (repealed)	39 Geo. 3. c. 89	12 July 1799
An act for regulating the manner in which the united company of merchants of England trading to the East Indies, shall hire and take up ships for their regular service. (Repealed by Hiring of Ships by East India Company Act 1818 (58 Geo. 3. c. 83))
Militia (No. 3) Act 1799 (repealed)	39 Geo. 3. c. 90	12 July 1799
An act to amend two acts, passed in the twenty-fifth (Note: Militia Pay Act 1785 (25 Geo. 3. c. 8)) and thirty-seventh (Note: Militia Act 1796 (37 Geo. 3. c. 3)) (Note: Militia (No. 2) Act 1796 (37 Geo. 3. c. 22)) years of the reign of his present Majesty, so far as the same relate to the militia of the counties of Middlesex and Surrey; and for applying certain monies remaining in the hands of the clerks to the deputy lieutenants of the county of Middlesex, and other persons, towards the completing of the said militia. (Repealed by Militia Act 1802 (42 Geo. 3. c. 90))
Lottery Act 1799 (repealed)	39 Geo. 3. c. 91	12 July 1799
An act for granting to his Majesty a certain sum of money, to be raised by a lottery. (Repealed by Statute Law Revision Act 1871 (34 & 35 Vict. c. 116))
Stamps (No. 2) Act 1799 (repealed)	39 Geo. 3. c. 92	12 July 1799
An act for altering the period of making up the annual account of the duties on stamped vellum, parchment, and paper. (Repealed by Inland Revenue Repeal Act 1870 (33 & 34 Vict. c. 99))
Forfeiture upon Attainder of Treason Act 1799 (repealed)	39 Geo. 3. c. 93	12 July 1799
An act to repeal so much of an act, passed in the seventh year of the reign of Queen Anne, (Note: Treason Act 1708 (7 Ann. c. 21)) and also so much of an act passed in the seventeenth year of the reign of his late majesty King George the Second, (Note: Treason Act 1743 (17 Geo. 2. c. 39)) as puts an end to the forfeiture of inheritances upon attainder of treason, after the death of the pretender and his sons. (Repealed by Statute Law Revision Act 1871 (34 & 35 Vict. c. 116))
Master of the Mint Act 1799 (repealed)	39 Geo. 3. c. 94	12 July 1799
An act to ascertain the salary of the master and work of his Majesty's mint. (Repealed by Coinage Act 1870 (33 & 34 Vict. c. 10))
Importation (No. 4) Act 1799 (repealed)	39 Geo. 3. c. 95	12 July 1799
An act to permit goods the produce of any foreign colony in America, imported directly from thence in any ship or vessel belonging to the subjects of any country or place in amity with his Majesty, to be entered and landed without payment of the duty granted by an act of the last session of parliament, for the better protecting of the trade of this kingdom. (Repealed by Statute Law Revision Act 1871 (34 & 35 Vict. c. 116))
Exportation (No. 2) Act 1799 (repealed)	39 Geo. 3. c. 96	12 July 1799
An act to enable Matthew Boulton, engineer, to export the machinery necessary for erecting a mint in the dominions of his imperial majesty the emperor of all the Russias. (Repealed by Statute Law Revision Act 1871 (34 & 35 Vict. c. 116))
Militia Pay Act 1799 (repealed)	39 Geo. 3. c. 97	12 July 1799
An act for defraying the charge of the pay and cloathing of the militia in that part of Great Britain called England, for one year, from the twenty-fifth day of March one thousand seven hundred and ninety-nine. (Repealed by Statute Law Revision Act 1871 (34 & 35 Vict. c. 116))
Importation (No. 5) Act 1799 (repealed)	39 Geo. 3. c. 98	12 July 1799
An act to allow the importation of Spanish wool, in ships belonging to counties in amity with his Majesty. (Repealed by Statute Law Revision Act 1871 (34 & 35 Vict. c. 116))
Trade to the Levant Seas Act 1799 (repealed)	39 Geo. 3. c. 99	12 July 1799
An act to encourage the trade into the Levant Seas, by providing a more convenient mode of performing quarantine, and for reducing the duty granted by an act of the last session on goods the manufacture of Great Britain, exported to any place within the streights of Gibraltar. (Repealed by Statute Law Revision Act 1861 (24 & 25 Vict. c. 101))
British Fisheries Society Act 1799 (repealed)	39 Geo. 3. c. 100	12 July 1799
An act to revive and continue, until the end of the next session of parliament, an act, made in the thirty-fifth year of the reign of his present Majesty, (Note: British Fisheries Act 1795 (35 Geo. 3. c. 56)) to continue and amend an act, made in the twenty-sixth year of the reign of his present Majesty, intituled, "An act for the more effectual encouragement of the British fisheries;" (Note: Fisheries (No. 2) Act 1786 (26 Geo. 3. c. 81)) and to amend an act, made in the twenty-sixth year of the reign of his present Majesty, (Note: British Fisheries Society Act 1786 (26 Geo. 3. c. 106)) for extending the fisheries, and improving the sea coast of this kingdom. (Repealed by Sea Fisheries Act 1868 (31 & 32 Vict. c. 45) and Statute Law Revision Act 1948 (11 & 12 Geo. 6. c. 62))
Fisheries in Greenland Seas, etc. Act 1799 (repealed)	39 Geo. 3. c. 101	12 July 1799
An act to continue several laws relating to the further support and encouragement of the fisheries carried on in the Greenland Seas and Davis's Streights, until the twenty-fifth day of December one thousand eight hundred, and to the discontinuing the duties payable on the importation of tallow, hog's lard, and grease, until the twenty-fifth day of March one thousand eight hundred and six. (Repealed by Statute Law Revision Act 1871 (34 & 35 Vict. c. 116))
Newfoundland Fisheries Act 1799 (repealed)	39 Geo. 3. c. 102	12 July 1799
An act to revive and continue, until the first day of January one thousand eight hundred and one, the bounties granted by an act, made in the twenty-sixth year of the reign of his present Majesty, (Note: Newfoundland Fisheries Act 1786 (26 Geo. 3. c. 26)) for encouraging the fisheries carried on at Newfoundland, and parts adjacent, from Great Britain, Ireland, and the British dominions in Europe. (Repealed by Statute Law Revision Act 1871 (34 & 35 Vict. c. 116))
Militia Allowances Act 1799 (repealed)	39 Geo. 3. c. 103	12 July 1799
An act for making allowances in certain cases to subaltern officers of the militia in time of peace. (Repealed by Statute Law Revision Act 1871 (34 & 35 Vict. c. 116))
Augmentation of 60th Regiment Act 1799 (repealed)	39 Geo. 3. c. 104	12 July 1799
An act to amend an act, passed in the twenty-ninth year of the reign of King George the Second, intituled, "An act to enable his Majesty to grant commissions to a certain number of foreign protestants, who have served abroad as officers or engineers, to act and rank as officers or engineers in America only, under certain restrictions and qualifications." (Note: Commissions to Foreign Protestants Act 1756 (29 Geo. 2. c. 5)) (Repealed by Statute Law Revision Act 1861 (24 & 25 Vict. c. 101))
Manufacture of Maidstone Geneva Act 1799 (repealed)	39 Geo. 3. c. 105	12 July 1799
An act to continue and amend so much of an act made in the thirty-third year of the reign of his present Majesty, as permits Sir William Bishop, George Bishop, and Argles Bishop, to carry on the manufacture of Maidstone geneva. (Note: Maidstone geneva was Maidstone gin.) (Repealed by Statute Law Revision Act 1871 (34 & 35 Vict. c. 116))
Militia (No. 4) Act 1799 or the Militia Reduction Act 1799 (repealed)	39 Geo. 3. c. 106	12 July 1799
An act for the reduction of the militia forces, at the time and in the manner therein limited; for enabling his Majesty more effectually to increase his regular forces, for the vigorous prosecution of the war; and for amending the laws relating to the militia. (Repealed by Militia Act 1802 (42 Geo. 3. c. 90))
Stamps (No. 3) Act 1799 (repealed)	39 Geo. 3. c. 107	12 July 1799
An act for granting to his Majesty certain stamp duties on bills of exchange and promissory notes for small sums of money. (Repealed by Inland Revenue Repeal Act 1870 (33 & 34 Vict. c. 99))
Land Tax Redemption (No. 4) Act 1799 (repealed)	39 Geo. 3. c. 108	12 July 1799
An act to amend and render more effectual several acts for the redemption and purchase of the land tax. (Repealed by Land Tax Redemption Act 1802 (42 Geo. 3. c. 116))
Forces of East India Company Act 1799 (repealed)	39 Geo. 3. c. 109	12 July 1799
An act for better recruiting the forces of the East India company. (Repealed by Statute Law Revision Act 1871 (34 & 35 Vict. c. 116))
Judges' Pensions Act 1799 (repealed)	39 Geo. 3. c. 110	12 July 1799
An act for the augmentation of the salaries of the judges of the courts in Westminster Hall, and also of the lords of session, lords commissioners of justiciary, and barons of exchequer, in Scotland; and for enabling his Majesty to grant annuities to persons in certain offices in the said courts of Westminster Hall, on the resignation of their respective offices. (Repealed by Supreme Court of Judicature (Consolidation) Act 1925 (15 & 16 Geo. 5. c. 49))
Importation (No. 6) Act 1799 (repealed)	39 Geo. 3. c. 111	12 July 1799
An act to permit, until the first day of August one thousand eight hundred and two, the importation of certain naval stores from Hamburgh, and other ports of Germany. (Repealed by Importation (No. 2) Act 1801 (42 Geo. 3. c. 7))
Importation (No. 7) Act 1799 (repealed)	39 Geo. 3. c. 112	12 July 1799
An act to enable his Majesty, by order in council, to permit, until six weeks after the commencement of the next session of parliament, such goods as shall be specified in such order to be imported into this kingdom, in neutral ships. (Repealed by Statute Law Revision Act 1871 (34 & 35 Vict. c. 116))
Appointment of Judges in Vacation Act 1799 (repealed)	39 Geo. 3. c. 113	12 July 1799
An act to enable such persons as his Majesty may be pleased to appoint to the office of chief justice, or of one of the justices of either bench, or of chief baron, or one of the barons of the exchequer, to take upon themselves the degree of a serjeant at law in vacation. (Repealed by Statute Law Revision Act 1871 (34 & 35 Vict. c. 116))
Appropriation Act 1799 (repealed)	39 Geo. 3. c. 114	12 July 1799
An act for granting to his Majesty a certain sum of money out of the consolidated fund, for applying certain sums of money therein mentioned, for the service of the year one thousand seven hundred and ninety-nine; and for further appropriating the supplies granted in this session of parliament. (Repealed by Statute Law Revision Act 1871 (34 & 35 Vict. c. 116))

=== Local acts ===
Short title	Citation	Royal assent
Long title
Coutts' Passage Act 1799	39 Geo. 3. c. i	7 March 1799
An act to enable Thomas Coutts esquire, banker, to make a communication between his buildings on the opposite sides of William Street, in the parish of Saint Martin in the Fields, within the city and liberty of Westminster, by a covered passage to be built over the said street.
Margate Pier Act 1799 (repealed)	39 Geo. 3. c. ii	21 March 1799
An act to amend and render more effectual an act, passed in the twenty-seventh year of the reign of his present Majesty, (Note: Margate (Improvement) Act 1787 (27 Geo. 3. c. 45)) for rebuilding the pier of Margate in the Isle of Thanet in the county of Kent; and for other purposes mentioned in the said act. (Repealed by County of Kent Act 1981 (c. xviii))
Whiteburn and Kelso Road Act 1799 (repealed)	39 Geo. 3. c. iii	21 March 1799
An act for making and maintaining the road from or near Whiteburn in the county of Berwick to the town of Kelso in the county of Roxburgh, to continue for twenty-one years, and from thence to the end of the then next session of parliament. (Note: This term expired on 6 August 1822.) (Repealed by Whiteburn and Kelso Road (Berwick) Act 1847 (10 & 11 Vict. c. iii))
St. Bride, Fleet Street, Poor Relief Act 1799 (repealed)	39 Geo. 3. c. iv	21 March 1799
An act for the better relief and employment of the poor of the parish of Saint Bridget, otherwise Saint Bride, Fleet Street, in the city of London. (Repealed by Statute Law (Repeals) Act 1998 (c. 43))
Oxford Canal Act 1799 (repealed)	39 Geo. 3. c. v	21 March 1799
An Act for explaining, amending, and rendering more effectual, several Acts, passed in the Ninth, (Note: Oxford Canal Act 1769 (9 Geo. 3. c. 70)) Fifteenth, (Note: Oxford Canal Act 1775 (15 Geo. 3. c. 9)) Twenty-sixth, (Note: Oxford Canal Act 1786 (26 Geo. 3. c. 20)) and Thirty-fourth (Note: Coventry to Oxford Canal Act 1794 (34 Geo. 3. c. 103)) Years of the Reign of His present Majesty, for making and maintaining a Navigable Canal from the Coventry Canal Navigation to the City of Oxford. (Repealed by Oxford Canal Navigation Act 1829 (10 Geo. 4. c. xlviii))
Brixham Harbour and Market Act 1799 (repealed)	39 Geo. 3. c. vi	21 March 1799
An act to enable the lords of the manor of Brixham, in the county of Devon, to repair and enlarge, or rebuild, the pier or quay at Brixham Quay, within the said manor, to improve the harbour there, to regulate the moorings of vessels therein, and to establish a market there. (Repealed by Torbay Harbour Act 1970 (c. liii))
Upton and Fishley Inclosures Act 1799	39 Geo. 3. c. vii	21 March 1799
An act for dividing, allotting, and inclosing, the arable lands, intermixed pastures, open fields, half year lands, commons, and waste grounds, within the parish of Upton, in the county of Norfolk, and such parts of the open fields, called Upton Field and Fishley Cross, as lie in the parish of Fishley, in the said county, and for draining the same.
Severn River Towing-path Act 1799	39 Geo. 3. c. viii	21 March 1799
An act for rendering more effectual an act, passed in the twelfth year of the reign of his present Majesty, intituled, "An act for making and keeping in repair a road or passage for horses, on the banks of the river Severn, between Bewdley Bridge and a place called The Meadow Wharf, at Coalbrook Dale, for haling and drawing vessels along the said river; and for other purposes therein mentioned." (Note: River Severn Act 1772 (12 Geo. 3. c. 109))
Knaresborough and Green Hammerton Road Act 1799 (repealed)	39 Geo. 3. c. ix	21 March 1799
An act for continuing for twenty one years, and from thence to the end of the then next session of parliament, the term, and altering and enlarging the powers, of two several acts, the one made and passed in the twenty-fifth year of the reign of his late majesty King George the Second, (Note: Knaresborough and Green Hammerton Road Act 1751 (25 Geo. 2. c. 53)) and the other in the eleventh year of the reign of his present Majesty, (Note: Knaresborough and Green Hamerton Road Act 1771 (11 Geo. 3. c. 65)) for repairing the road from Knaresbrough, in the county of York, by Long Flatt Lane, Gouldsbrough Fields, (Note: Gouldsborough Fields, off the A59 east of Knaresborough. 54°00′33″N 1°24′41″W) Flaxby, (Note: Flaxby, Yorkshire. 54°00′56″N 1°23′51″W) Alerton Mauleverer, (Note: Allerton Mauleverer, Yorkshire.) and Scate Moor, (Note: Scate Moor, off the A59, west of Green Hammerton.54°00′10″N 1°19′39″W) to Greenhammerton, (Note: Green Hammerton, Yorkshire. 54°00′20″N 1°18′06″W) in the same county, and for making the same a high carriage Road. (Repealed by Knaresborough and Green Hammerton Turnpike Road Act 1856 (19 & 20 Vict. c. xlix))
Ferrybridge, Wetherby and Boroughbridge Road Act 1799 (repealed)	39 Geo. 3. c. x	21 March 1799
An act for continuing for twenty-one years, and from thence to the end of the then next session of parliament, the term, and altering and enlarging the powers, of three several acts passed in the fourteenth (Note: Doncaster and Tadcaster Road Act 1740 (14 Geo. 2. c. 28)) and twenty-sixth (Note: Ferrybridge and Boroughbridge Road Act 1753 (26 Geo. 2. c. 77)) years of the reign of his late majesty King George the Second, and in the twenty-third year of the reign of his present Majesty, (Note: Yorkshire Roads Act 1783 (23 Geo. 3. c. 95)) for repairing the roads from Doncaster, through Ferrybridge, to the south side of Tadcaster Cross, and also from Ferrybridge to Wetherby, and from thence to Boroughbridge, in the county of York, so far as same relate to the road between Ferrybridge and Wetherby, and from thence to Boroughbridge. (Repealed by Ferrybridge and Boroughbridge Road Act 1842 (5 & 6 Vict. c. lxxxvi))
Evesham and Alcester Road Act 1799	39 Geo. 3. c. xi	21 March 1799
An act to continue for the term of twenty-one years, and from thence to the end of the then next session of parliament, and for enlarging the powers of an act, made in the eighteenth year of the reign of his present Majesty, (Note: Evesham Roads Act 1778 (18 Geo. 3. c. 93)) for repairing and widening the road from Evesham Bridge, (Note: The medieval bridge in Evesham, replaced by the Workman Bridge in 1856. 52°05′29″N 1°56′35″W) in the borough of Evesham, in the county of Worcester, to The Globe Inn in Alcester, (Note: The Globe Inn stood at the junction of Evesham Road and Swan Street in Alcester, Warwickshire. The site is now occupied by a roundabout. 52°12′50″N 1°52′20″W) in the county of Warwick.
Nottingham and Derby Road Act 1799 (repealed)	39 Geo. 3. c. xii	21 March 1799
An act for continuing for twenty-one years, and from thence to the end of the then next session of parliament, the term, and altering and enlarging the powers of two acts, made in the thirty-second year of the reign of his late majesty King George the Second, (Note: Notts and Derby Roads Act 1758 (32 Geo. 2. c. 38)) and in the twentieth year of the reign of his present Majesty, (Note: Derby and Nottinghamshire Roads Act 1780 (20 Geo. 3. c. 74)) for repairing and widening certain roads leading to and from the towns of Nottingham and Derby, so far as relates to the road leading from Chappel Bar, near the west end of the town of Nottingham, to Saint Mary's Bridge in the town of Derby, and from the guide post in the parish of Lenton to Sawley ferry. (Repealed by Nottingham and Derby, and Lenton and Sawley Ferry Roads Act 1827 (7 & 8 Geo. 4. c. xxvii))
Kilburn and Sparrow's Herne Road Act 1799	39 Geo. 3. c. xiii	21 March 1799
An act to continue, for the term of twenty-one years, and from thence to the end of the then next session of parliament, the term, and for altering and enlarging the powers, of an act made in the nineteenth year of the reign of his present Majesty, (Note: Kilburn Road Act 1779 (19 Geo. 3. c. 120)) for repairing the road leading from Kilburn Bridge, in the county of Middlesex, to Sparrow's Herne, in the county of Hertford.
Burton-upon-Trent and Derby Road Act 1799 (repealed)	39 Geo. 3. c. xiv	21 March 1799
An act for continuing for twenty-one years, and from thence to the end of the then next session of parliament, the term, and increasing, altering, and enlarging the powers, of two several acts, passed in the twenty-sixth year of the reign of his late majesty King George the Second, (Note: Burton-upon-Trent and Derby Road Act 1753 (26 Geo. 2. c. 59)) and in the fourth year of the reign of his present Majesty, (Note: Burton-upon-Trent and Derby Road Act 1764 (4 Geo. 3. c. 51)) for repairing and-widening the road from the west end of the town of Burton-upon-Trent, in the county of Stafford, through the said town, to the south end of the town of Derby, in the county of Derby. (Repealed by Burton-upon-Trent and Derby Road Act 1818 (58 Geo. 3. c. xxxvi))
Much Wenlock and Gleeton Hill and Cressage Roads Act 1799	39 Geo. 3. c. xv	21 March 1799
An act for continuing for twenty-one years, and from thence to the end of the then next session of parliament, the term, and altering and enlarging the powers of two acts, passed in the twenty-ninth year of the reign of his late majesty King George the Second, (Note: Much Wenlock Roads Act 1756 (29 Geo. 2. c. 60)) and the eighteenth year of the reign of his present Majesty, (Note: Much Wenlock Roads Act 1778 (18 Geo. 3. c. 89)) for amending, widening, and keeping in repair, several roads leading from the market house in the town of Much Wenlock, and from Gleeton Hill to Cressage, in the county of Salop.
Watling Street Turnpike Road Act 1799 (repealed)	39 Geo. 3. c. xvi	21 March 1799
An act for continuing for twenty-one years, and from thence to the end of the then next session of parliament, the term, and altering and enlarging the powers, of an act, passed in the eighteenth year of the reign of his present Majesty, (Note: Salop Roads Act 1778 (18 Geo. 3. c. 88)) for repairing and widening the road from The Birges Brook to Buildwas Bridge, (Note: Buildwas Bridge, in Buildwas, Shropshire. 52°38′11″N 2°31′33″W) and from thence to join the Watling Street turnpike road at Tern Bridge, (Note: Junction with the B4380 (formerly the A5) east of Tern Bridge, Atcham, Shropshire. 52°40′49″N 2°39′28″W) in the county of Salop, so far as relates to the last-mentioned road. (Repealed by Statute Law (Repeals) Act 2013 (c. 2))
Gosport and Bishop's Waltham, and Wickham and Cawton Roads Act 1799 (repealed)	39 Geo. 3. c. xvii	21 March 1799
An act to continue, for twenty-one years, and from thence to the end of the then next session of parliament, the term, and to amend the powers, of an act, passed in the twentieth year of the reign of his present Majesty, (Note: Southampton Roads Act 1780 (20 Geo. 3. c. 77)) for repairing and widening the roads from Gosport, through Fareham and Wickham to Bishop's Waltham, and from Wickham aforesaid, to Chawton Pond, in the parish of Chawton, all in the county of Southampton. (Repealed by Gosport and Bishop's Waltham, and Wickham and Chawton Road Act 1828 (9 Geo. 4. c. xlix))
Hertford and Broadwater and Ware and Walkern Roads Act 1799	39 Geo. 3. c. xviii	19 April 1799
An act for continuing for twenty-one years, and from thence to the end of the then next session of parliament, the term and powers of two acts, passed in the passed in the thirtieth year of the reign of his late majesty King George the Second, (Note: Hertford and Broadwater Road Act 1757 (30 Geo. 2. c. 45)) and the eighteenth year of the reign of his present Majesty, (Note: Hertford Roads (No. 2) Act 1778 (18 Geo. 3. c. 94)) for amending widening, and keeping in repair, the roads from the east end of the town of Hertford, in the county of Hertford, through Watton, to Broadwater, and from the town of Ware, through Watton, to the north end of the town of Walkern, in the said county.
Enfield and Hertford and Hertford and Ware Roads Act 1799 (repealed)	39 Geo. 3. c. xix	19 April 1799
An ac for continuing for twenty-one years, and from thence to the end of the then next session of parliament, the term, and altering and enlarging the powers, of several acts, passed in the eleventh year of King George the First, (Note: Hertford and Ware Roads Act 1724 (11 Geo. 1. c. 11)) the sixth (Note: Hertford and Ware Roads Act 1732 (6 Geo. 2. c. 15)) and twenty-sixth (Note: Hertford and Ware Roads Act 1753 (26 Geo. 2. c. 56)) years of his late Majesty, and in the twelfth year of the reign of his present Majesty, (Note: Middlesex and Hertford Roads Act 1772 (12 Geo. 3. c. 84)) for repairing the roads from the parish of Enfield, in the county of Middlesex, to the town of Hertford, and from the end of the town of Hertford to Amwell End, near Ware, in the county of Hertford, and other roads in the said acts mentioned. (Repealed by Roads from Hertford and Ware Act 1833 (3 & 4 Will. 4. c. xlii))
Weyhill and Lydeway Road Act 1799	39 Geo. 3. c. xx	10 May 1799
An act for continuing for twenty-one years, and from thence to the end of the then next session of parliament, the term, and altering and enlarging the powers, of two acts, passed in the second (Note: Weyhill and Lyde Way Road Act 1762 (2 Geo. 3. c. 60)) and twenty-second (Note: Wey Hill to Lyde Way Road Act 1782 (22 Geo. 3. c. 109)) years of the reign of his present Majesty, for repairing and widening the road from the turnpike road at Weyhill, in the county of Southampton, to the turnpike road at Lydeway, in the county of Wilts.
Selby and Leeds Road Act 1799 (repealed)	39 Geo. 3. c. xxi	10 May 1799
An act for continuing for twenty-one years, and from thence to the end of the then next session of parliament, the term, and altering and enlarging the powers, of three several acts, paired in the fourteenth (Note: Leeds and Halifax Roads Act 1740 (14 Geo. 2. c. 32)) and twenty-fourth (Note: Tadcaster, etc., Roads Act 1750 (24 Geo. 2. c. 22)) year of the reign of his late majesty King George the Second, and in the twenty-sixth year of the reign of his present Majesty, (Note: Selby to Leeds Road Act 1786 (26 Geo. 3. c. 155)) so far as the same relate to the road from Selby to Leeds, in the west riding of the county of York. (Repealed by Selby and Leeds Road Act 1820 (1 Geo. 4. c. lxv))
Dumfries and Roxburgh County Roads Act 1799 (repealed)	39 Geo. 3. c. xxii	10 May 1799
An act for repairing the several roads in the counties of Dumfries and Roxburgh, to continue in force for twenty-one years, and from thence to the end of the then next session of parliament. (Repealed by Roads in Dumfries and Roxburgh Act 1820 (1 Geo. 4. c. lxxiv))
Jeremy's Ferry Bridge and Roads (Essex and Middlesex) Act 1799 (repealed)	39 Geo. 3. c. xxiii	10 May 1799
An act to continue, for twenty-one years, and from thence to the end of the then next session of parliament, the term and powers of two acts, passed in the thirtieth year of the reign of his late Majesty, (Note: River Lea Bridge and Roads Act 1757 (30 Geo. 2. c. 59)) and the eighteenth year of the reign of his present Majesty, (Note: Jeremy's Ferry Bridge, River Lee Act 1778 (18 Geo. 3. c. 10)) for building a bridge over the river Lea, at or near a place called Jeremy's Ferry, (Note: Jeremy's Ferry is now known as Lea Bridge. 51°33′44″N 0°02′44″W) and for making, repairing, and widening roads from thence into the great roads at Snaresbrook in the county of Essex, and at Clapton in the county of Middlesex. (Repealed by Statute Law (Repeals) Act 2008 (c. 12))
Kirkby Kendall and Kirkby Ireleth Road Act 1799	39 Geo. 3. c. xxiv	10 May 1799
An act for continuing for twenty-one years, and from thence to the end of the then next session of parliament, the term, and altering and enlarging the powers, of two acts passed in the third (Note: Kirby Kendal and Kirby Ireleth Road Act 1763 (3 Geo. 3. c. 33)) and twenty-fourth (Note: Kirby Kendal to Kirkby Ireleth Road Act 1783 (24 Geo. 3. Sess. 1. c. 23)) years of the reign of his present majesty King George the Third, for repairing, widening, and keeping in repair the road from Kirkby Kendall, in the county of Westmorland, to Kirkby Ireleth, in the county of Lancaster.
Oldham Roads Act 1799 (repealed)	39 Geo. 3. c. xxv	10 May 1799
An act for more effectually repairing and improving the roads from Manchester, in the county palatine of Lancaster, through Oldham to Austerlands, in the parish of Saddleworth, in the county of York, and from Oldham to Ashton-under-Lyne, and from Oldham to the village of Royton, in the said county palatine of Lancaster. (Repealed by Manchester to Austerlands Roads Act 1806 (46 Geo. 3. c. lxiii))
Foston Bridge and Little Drayton Road Act 1799	39 Geo. 3. c. xxvi	10 May 1799
An act for more effectually repairing and improving the road from Fosten Bridge, in the county of Lincoln, to Little Drayton, in the county of Nottingham.
Crinan Canal Act 1799	39 Geo. 3. c. xxvii	10 May 1799
An act for amending and rendering more effectual an act, passed in the thirty-third year of the reign of his present Majesty, intituled, "An act for mating and maintaining a navigable canal from Loch Gilp to Loch Crinan in the shire of Argyll." (Note: Crinan Canal Act 1793 (33 Geo. 3. c. 104))
Cressage (Severn) Bridge Act 1799	39 Geo. 3. c. xxviii	10 May 1799
An act for building a bridge over the river Severn, from or near Cressage, in the county of Salop, to the opposite shore; and for making proper roads or avenues to and from the same.
Roads from Shrewsbury, Pulley Common, Coleham Bridge and Longden Act 1799	39 Geo. 3. c. xxix	10 May 1799
An act for continuing for twenty-one years, and from thence to the end of the then next session of parliament, the term, and alter and enlarge the powers, of two acts, made in the twenty-ninth year of the reign of his late Majesty, (Note: Shropshire Roads Act 1756 (29 Geo. 2. c. 61)) and in the twenty-fifth year of the reign of his present Majesty, (Note: Salop, Radnor and Montgomery Roads Act 1785 (25 Geo. 3. c. 118)) for repairing and widening the roads from Coleham Bridge, in Shrewsbury, to the market place in Church Stretton, and to the top of Lythwood Hill, and from Pulley Common to the maypole in Condover; and from Colthom Bridge to Longdon, and from the fifth milestone near Longdon, to the turnpike gate at Castle Pulverbatch, in the county of Salop.
Great Staughton and Wellingborough, and Kimbolton and Brington Bridge Roads Act 1799	39 Geo. 3. c. xxx	10 May 1799
An act to continue for twenty-one years, and from thence to the end of the then next session of parliament, the term, and enlarge the powers, of two acts, passed in the twenty-eighth year of the reign of his late majesty King George the Second, (Note: Kimbolton Road Act 1755 (28 Geo. 2. c. 33)) and in the fourteenth year of the reign of his present Majesty, (Note: Hunts Roads Act 1774 (14 Geo. 3. c. 118)) for repairing the roads from the north end of Brown's Lane, in Great Staughton in the county of Huntingdon, to the way post near Wellingborough Bridge in the county of Northampton, and from the pound in Kimbolton to the way post near Brington Bridge, in the said county of Huntingdon.
Lewes Road Act 1799	39 Geo. 3. c. xxxi	10 May 1799
An act for continuing for twenty-one years, and from thence to the end of the then next session of parliament, the term, and altering and enlarging the powers, of several acts, for repairing the road from the north end of Mailing Street, near the town of Lewes, and certain other roads in the county of Sussex.
Newark-upon-Trent and Bingham Road Act 1799 (repealed)	39 Geo. 3. c. xxxii	10 May 1799
An act for continuing for twenty-one years, and from thence to the end of the then next session of parliament, the term, and altering and enlarging the powers of an act, passed in the thirteenth year of the reign of his present Majesty, (Note: Nottinghamshire Roads Act 1773 (13 Geo. 3. c. 90)) for repairing and widening the road from Newark-upon-Trent, in the county of Nottingham, to join the turnpike road from Nottingham to Grantham, in the county of Lincoln, near the guide post on the Foss Road near Bingham, in the said county of Nottingham. (Repealed by Newark-upon-Trent and Bingham Road Act 1821 (1 & 2 Geo. 4. c. xxx))
Bridport Roads Act 1799 (repealed)	39 Geo. 3. c. xxxiii	10 May 1799
An act to continue for twenty-one years, and from thence to the end of the then next session of parliament, the term, and to alter, enlarge, and repeal some of the provisions, of two acts, passed in the twenty-seventh year of the reign of King George the Second, (Note: Axminster Roads Act 1754 (27 Geo. 2. c. 32)) and in the fifth year of the reign of his present Majesty, (Note: Dorset and Devon Roads Act 1765 (5 Geo. 3. c. 75)) so far as the said acts relate to the repairing of the roads from an intrenchment on Askerwell Hill, through Bridport to Penn Inn, from Bridport to Beaminser, from the north end of the south street of Bridport Harbour, from the north turnpike gate at Beaminster to Beaminster Wood, otherwise Wood Common, and to Lehham's Water, all in the county of Dorset. (Repealed by Roads to and from Bridport Act 1819 (59 Geo. 3. c. lxxxviii))
Guildford and New Bridge Road Act 1799	39 Geo. 3. c. xxxiv	10 May 1799
An act for continuing for twenty-one years, and from thence to the end of the then next session of parliament, the term, and altering and enlarging the powers, of two acts, passed in the eighteenth year of the reign of his late majesty King George the Second, (Note: Guildford and Arundel Road Act 1757 (30 Geo. 2. c. 60)) and the eighteenth year of his present Majesty, (Note: Surrey and Sussex Roads Act 1778 (18 Geo. 3. c. 110)) so far as the said acts relate to the repairing and widening the road from the north end of Dapden Wharf, in the parish of Stoke, next Guldeford, through Guldeford, to Andrew's Cross, and to Alford Bars, in the county of Surrey, and from thence to New Bridge, in the county of Sussex.
Gander Lane and Sheffield, and Mosborough Green and Clown Roads Act 1799	39 Geo. 3. c. xxxv	10 May 1799
An act to continue for twenty-one years, and from thence to the end of the then next session of parliament, the term, and to alter and enlarge the powers of an act, passed in the nineteenth year of the reign of his present Majesty, (Note: Derby and Yorks Roads Act 1779 (19 Geo. 3. c. 99)) for repairing and widening the roads from Gander-Lane in the county of Derby, to Sheffield in the county of York, and from Mosbrough-Green to Clown, both in the said county of Derby.
Liverpool Water Supply Act 1799 (repealed)	39 Geo. 3. c. xxxvi	13 June 1799
An act for better supplying the town and port of Liverpool with water, from certain springs in the township of Bootle in the county palatine of Lancaster. (Repealed by Liverpool Corporation Act 1921 (11 & 12 Geo. 5. c. lxxiv))
Nuffield and Farringdon Road Act 1799 (repealed)	39 Geo. 3. c. xxxvii	13 June 1799
An act for continuing, for twenty-one years, and from thence to the end of the then next session of parliament, the term, and altering and enlarging the powers of two several acts, the one passed in the twenty-fifth year of the reign of his late majesty King George the Second, (Note: Berkshire Roads Act 1751 (25 Geo. 2. c. 21)) and the other in the fifth year of the reign of his present Majesty, (Note: Berkshire and Oxford Roads Act 1765 (5 Geo. 3. c. 55)) for amending and keeping in repair the road leading from the north-east comer of Nuffield Common, by the parish church of Nuffield, otherwise Tuffield, in the county of Oxford, through Waltingford to Wantage, and fron thence to Farringdon, in the county of Berks. (Repealed by Nuffield and Faringdon Road Act 1841 (4 & 5 Vict. c. cvii))
Taunton Roads Act 1799 (repealed)	39 Geo. 3. c. xxxviii	13 June 1799
An act for altering, enlarging, and repealing some of the provisions in an act, passed in the eighteenth year of the reign of his present Majesty, (Note: Taunton Roads Act 1778 (18 Geo. 3. c. 97)) for repairing several roads leading from the town of Taunton, and other roads adjoining thereto, in the county of Somerset; and also for extending the provisions of the said act, to a road from Tucker's Gate, in the parish of Lyng, to Piper's Inn, in the parish of Ashcott, in the said county of Somerset. (Repealed by Taunton Roads Act 1840 (3 & 4 Vict. c. xxxvi))
Port Glasgow and Newark Two Pennies Scots Act 1799 (repealed)	39 Geo. 3. c. xxxix	13 June 1799
An act for continuing for thirty-eight years, and rendering more effectual several acts for charging a duty of two pennies Scots (or one sixth part of a penny sterling) on every pint of ale and beer vended or sold within the towns of Port Glasgow and Newark, and privileges thereof. (Repealed by Statute Law (Repeals) Act 2013 (c. 2))
Glasgow and Gorbals Two Pennies Scots Act 1799 (repealed)	39 Geo. 3. c. xl	13 June 1799
An act for continuing for thirty-eight years, and rendering more effectual an act passed in the twenty-eighth year of the reign of his late Majesty, (Note: Glasgow Beer Duties Act 1755 (28 Geo. 2. c. 29)) for continuing the duty of two pennies Scots, of one sixth part of a penny sterling, on every pint of ale and beer vended or sold within the city of Glasgow and village of Gorbals, and liberties and privileges thereof. (Repealed by Statute Law (Repeals) Act 2013 (c. 2))
St. Andrew Holborn and St. George the Martyr Poor Relief Act 1799 (repealed)	39 Geo. 3. c. xli	13 June 1799
An act for better regulating and employing the poor, and for more effectually watching the squares, streets, lanes, and other places, within that part of the parish of Saint Andrew Holborn which lies above the bars, in the county of Middlesex, and the parish of Saint George the Martyr, in the said county. (Repealed by Borough of Holborn (St. Andrew Holborn-above-Bars and St. George the Martyr) Scheme (No. 1) Order 1901 (SR&O 1901/269))
Samford Poor Relief Act 1799 (repealed)	39 Geo. 3. c. xlii	13 June 1799
An act for the better and more effectual relief and employment of the poor in the hundred of Samford, in the county of Suffolk. (Repealed by Statute Law (Repeals) Act 2013 (c. 2))
Morpeth and Piercy's Cross Road (Northumberland) Act 1799 (repealed)	39 Geo. 3. c. xliii	13 June 1799
An act for more effectually repairing and amending the road leading from Long Horseley Bar or Gate, on the post road near the town of Morpeth, by or through Long Horseley, Weldon Bridge, and Whittingham, to the river Breamish, and from thence to Piercy's Cross, in the county of Northumberland, to continue in force for twenty one years, and from thence to the end of the then next session of parliament. (Repealed by Morpeth and Piercy's Cross Road (Northumberland) Act 1820 (1 Geo. 4. c. lxxi))
Leith Harbour Act 1799 (repealed)	39 Geo. 3. c. xliv	13 June 1799
An act to amend two acts, made in the twenty-eighth (Note: Leith Harbour Act 1788 (28 Geo. 3. c. 58)) and thirty-eighth (Note: Leith Harbour Act 1798 (38 Geo. 3. c. xix)) years of the reign of his present Majesty, for enlarging and improving the harbour of Leith. (Repealed by Leith Harbour and Docks Act 1875 (38 & 39 Vict. c. clx))
Livingstone and Glasgow Road Act 1799 (repealed)	39 Geo. 3. c. xlv	13 June 1799
An act for explaining and amending two acts, passed in the thirty-first (Note: Ayr Roads Act 1791 (31 Geo. 3. c. 107)) and thirty-second (Note: Edinburgh Linlithgow and Lanark Roads etc Act 1792 (32 Geo. 3. c. 120)) years of the reign of his present Majesty, for repairing the roads from Livingstone, by the kirk of Shotts, to the city of Glasgow, and other roads therein mentioned. (Repealed by Livingston and Glasgow Road Act 1814 (54 Geo. 3. c. ccii))
Dunkeld and Coupar of Angus Road and Branch Act 1799 (repealed)	39 Geo. 3. c. xlvi	13 June 1799
An act for making and repairing the road from Dunkeld to Coupar of Angus, by the bridge of Isla, and the road leading out of the road between Dunkeld and Perth to the Boat at Caputh, by or through the village of Stanley in the county of Perth, to continue in force for twenty-one years, and from thence to the end of the then next session of parliament. (Repealed by Roads and Bridges in Perthshire Act 1811 (51 Geo. 3. c. cxcviii))
Loughborough, Ashby-de-la-Zouche and Rempstone Roads Act 1799 (repealed)	39 Geo. 3. c. xlvii	13 June 1799
An act for continuing for twenty-one years, and from thence to the end of the then next session of parliament, the term, and enlarging and altering the powers, of two acts, the one passed in the thirtieth year of the reign of his late majesty King George the Second, (Note: Leicester Roads Act 1757 (30 Geo. 2. c. 44)) and the other in the second year of the reign of his present Majesty, (Note: Leicester and Notts Roads Act 1762 (2 Geo. 3. c. 82)) for amending, widening, and keeping in repair, the road leading from Burleigh Bridge, in the town of Loughborough to Ashby-de-la-Zouch, in the county of Leicester; and tor repairing and widening the road, branching out of the said road at Coleorton Church, over Coleorton Moor, and through Worthington and Sutton Bonington, to Rempston, in the counties of Leicester and Nottingham. (Repealed by Loughborough, Ashby-de-la-Zouche and Rempstone Road Act 1863 (26 & 27 Vict. c. liii))
Melksham and Castle Coombe Road Act 1799	39 Geo. 3. c. xlviii	13 June 1799
An act for more effectually amending, widening, and keeping in repair, the road from the turnpike road at the bottom of Shaw Hill, in the parish of Melksham, through Googe's Lane, Corsham, Biddestone, and West Yatton, to the turnpike road at Upper Coombe, in the parish of Castle Coombe, in the county of Wilts.
Road from Beckhampton and from Swindon Act 1799	39 Geo. 3. c. xlix	13 June 1799
An act for more effectually repairing, widening, altering, and improving the road at or near Beckhampton, and from the north side of Swindon to the Carpenter's Arms in Blunsden, and several other roads therein mentioned, in the county oi Wilts.
Market Harborough and Brampton Road Act 1799 (repealed)	39 Geo. 3. c. l	13 June 1799
An act for continuing for twenty-one years, and from thence to the end of the then next session of parliament, the term, and altering and amending the powers, of three several acts, passed in the twenty-fifth, (Note: Market Harborough and Brampton Road Act 1751 (25 Geo. 2. c. 57)) twenty-seventh, (Note: Market Harborough and Brampton Road Act 1754 (27 Geo. 2. c. 28)) and thirty-third (Note: Market Harborough and Brampton Road Act 1759 (33 Geo. 2. c. 38)) years of the reign of his late majesty King George the Second, for repairing and widening the road leading from Market Harborough, in the county of Leicester, to the pound in the parish of Brampton, in the county of Huntingdon. (Repealed by Road from Market Harborough to Brampton (Huntingdonshire) Road Act 1841 (4 & 5 Vict. c. xxxv))
Road from Gateshead and from the Bar Moor Act 1799 (repealed)	39 Geo. 3. c. li	13 June 1799
An act for more effectually amending, widening, improving, and keeping in repair, the road from Gateshead, in the county of Durham, to the Church Lane near Ryton Lane Head, and from the Bar Moor to the Hexham turnpike road, near Dilston Bar, in the county of Northumberland, and also several other roads therein described, lying within the said counties. (Repealed by Road from Gateshead to Hexham Act 1820 (1 Geo. 4. c. xxx))
Skipton and Clitheroe Road Act 1799 (repealed)	39 Geo. 3. c. lii	13 June 1799
An act for more effectually repairing and improving the road from Skipton, in the county of York, to Clitheroe, in the county of Lancaster. (Repealed by Skipton and Clitheroe Road Act 1821 (1 & 2 Geo. 4. c. xxxi))
Kelso (Tweed) Bridge Act 1799	39 Geo. 3. c. liii	13 June 1799
An act for building a bridge over the river Tweed, at or near the town of Kelso, in the county of Roxburgh.
Lord Rolle's Estate Act 1799	39 Geo. 3. c. liv	13 June 1799
An act for vesting part of the settled estates of the right honourable John lord Rolle in trustees, to sell or exchange the same, and purchase, or take in exchange, other estates to be settled in lieu thereof to the same uses.
Earl of Wycombe's Estate Act 1799	39 Geo. 3. c. lv	13 June 1799
An act for vesting certain estates in Tokenhouse Yard, in the city oi London, in the trustees of the other settled estates of the marquis of Lansdown and the right honourable John Henry Petty, commonly called Earl of Wycombe, in trust to be sold, and for laying out the monies arising from the sale in the manner therein directed; and for empowering the said trustees of the said settled estates to apply the monies arising from the sale of any part thereof in the manner therein directed; and for discharging the said settled estates from a rent charge of five hundred pounds given to James Petty esquire, and the heirs male of his body, by the will of Henry formerly earl of Shelburne, deceased.
Payne's Estate Act 1799	39 Geo. 3. c. lvi	13 June 1799
An act for vesting part of the settled estates of Simon Payne esquire, and Hester his wife, in the county of Gloucester, in trustees, to be exchanged for part of their unsettled estates, in the county of Somerset.
Thornton Marsh Inclosure Act 1799	39 Geo. 3. c. lvii	13 June 1799
An act for dividing, allotting, and enclosing, a certain trad or parcel of common, waste, and marsh grounds, called Thornton Marsh, within the several parishes of Poulton and Bispham, in the county palatine of Lancaster.
London, Westminster and Southwark Porterage Rates Act 1799 (repealed)	39 Geo. 3. c. lviii	21 June 1799
An act for regulating the rates of porterage to be taken by innkeepers and other persons, within the cities of London and Westminster, the borough of Southwark, and places adjacent. (Repealed by Statute Law (Repeals) Act 2008 (c. 12))
Liverpool Harbour Act 1799 (repealed)	39 Geo. 3. c. lix	21 June 1799
An act to enlarge the term, and alter and enlarge the powers, of several acts, relating to the harbour of Liverpool; and for making two additional wet docks and piers in or near the port of Liverpool; and for rendering more safe and commodious the said port and docks. (Repealed by Mersey Dock Acts Consolidation Act 1858 (21 & 22 Vict. c. xcii))
Stratford-upon-Avon Canal Act 1799	39 Geo. 3. c. lx	21 June 1799
An act for authorising the company of proprietors of the Stratford upon Avon canal navigation to vary the course of certain parts of the said canal, directed to be made by an act, passed in the thirty-third year of the reign of his present Majesty, (Note: Stratford-upon-Avon Canal Act 1793 (33 Geo. 3. c. 112)) and also to made a branch out of the said canal, and also to vary the course of a navigable cut directed to be made from the said Stratford upon Avon canal, in the parish of Lapworth, into the Warwick and Birmingham canal, in the manor of Kingswood, in the county of Warwick, by another act, passed in the thirty-fifth year of the reign of his present Majesty, (Note: Lapworth to Kingswood Canal Act 1795 (35 Geo. 3. c. 72)) and for amending the said acts.
Trowbridge Improvement Act 1799	39 Geo. 3. c. lxi	1 July 1799
An act for paving the footways, and for cleansing, lighting, and regulating, the streets, lanes, and other publick passages and places, within the town of Trowbridge, in the county of Wilts; and for removing and preventing nuisances, annoyances, and obstructions, therein.
Rochester and Maidstone Road Act 1799	39 Geo. 3. c. lxii	1 July 1799
An act for continuing for twenty-one years, and from thence to the end of the then next session of parliament, the term, and altering and enlarging the powers, of an act, passed in the thirteenth year of the reign of his present majesty King George the Third, (Note: Kent Roads (No. 2) Act 1773 (13 Geo. 3. c. 114)) intituled, "An act for enlarging the term and powers of three acts, passed in the first, (Note: Rochester to Maidstone Road Act 1727 (1 Geo. 2. St. 2. c. 12)) ninth, (Note: Kent Roads Act 1735 (9 Geo. 2. c. 7)) and twenty-second (Note: Kent Roads (No. 2) Act 1748 (22 Geo. 2. c. 8)) years of the reign of his late majesty King George the Second, for repairing and enlarging the road leading from the house called The Sign of the Bells, in the parish of Saint Margaret, in Rochester, to Maidstone, and other roads therein mentioned, in the county of Kent."
Seend, Trowbridge and Beckington Road Act 1799 (repealed)	39 Geo. 3. c. lxiii	1 July 1799
An act for more effectually repairing and improving the road from The Green Man, in the chapelry of Seend, in the county of Wilts, through Trowbridge, to Beckington, in the county of Somerset, and several other roads communicating with, or lying near to, the said road; and for making and maintaining certain pieces of new road in Trowbridge aforesaid. (Repealed by Trowbridge Roads Act 1819 (59 Geo. 3. c. xliv))
Ardwick Green and Wilmslow Road Act 1799 (repealed)	39 Geo. 3. c. lxiv	1 July 1799
An act for continuing for twenty-one years, and from thence to the end of the then next session of parliament, the term, and enlarging the powers of an act, passed in the thirty-third year of the reign of his present Majesty, intituled, "An act for repairing, widening, altering, diverting, and turning the road from Ardwick Green, near Manchester, in the county of Lancaster, to the bridge at the corn mills at Wilmslow, in the county of Chester." (Note: Manchester to Wilmslow Road Act 1793 (33 Geo. 3. c. 170)) (Repealed by Manchester and Wilmslow Road Act 1818 (58 Geo. 3. c. xii))
Poole Roads Act 1799 (repealed)	39 Geo. 3. c. lxv	1 July 1799
An act to continue, for twenty-one years, and from thence to the end of the then next session of parliament, the term, and alter and enlarge the powers of an act, passed in the seventeenth year of the reign of his present Majesty, (Note: Poole Roads Act 1777 (17 Geo. 3. c. 104)) intituled, "An act for more effectually amending, widening, and keeping in repair, several roads therein mentioned, leading from a gate, in the town and county of Poole, called Poole Gate; and for repealing two acts of Parliament, of the twenty-ninth (Note: Poole Roads Act 1756 (29 Geo. 2. c. 52)) and thirtieth (Note: Poole Roads Act 1757 (30 Geo. 2. c. 66)) years of his late Majesty, relating to the said roads; and also for applying a certain sum of money therein mentioned, towards paving and repairing a certain street or way within the said town and county." (Repealed by Poole Roads Act 1836 (6 & 7 Will. 4. c. xlvii))
Earl Fauconberg's Estate Act 1799	39 Geo. 3. c. lxvi	1 July 1799
An act to empower the right honourable Henry earl Fauconberg to charge his settled estates in the counties of York and Chester with the sum of fifteen thousand pounds, in lieu of the right of him the said Henry earl Fauconberg, and the other tenants for life of the said estates, to cut down timber growing thereon and to grant building leases of such parts of the said settled estates as are near, or adjoining to, the town of Macclesfield, in the said county of Chester; and for vesting the manor and other hereditaments of and in Sutton in the Forest, in the said county of York, other part of the said settled estates, in trustees, in trust to sell the same, and, out of the money arising from the sale thereof, to discharge the incumbrances on the said settled estates.
Duberly's Estate Act 1799	39 Geo. 3. c. lxvii	1 July 1799
An act for more easily effectuating the sale of part of the freehold estates late of Janus Duberly esquire, deceased, and for applying the clear monies to arise therefrom upon the trusts of the marriage settlements of his five daughters.
Egerton's Estate Act 1799	39 Geo. 3. c. lxviii	1 July 1799
An act for vesting the fee simple of several estates in the county of Chester, (devised by the will of Philip Egerton esquire, deceased, to a trustee for a term of years, for the purpose of discharging his debts, with remainder to the uses therein mentioned), in trustees, to be sold for discharging the said debts, and to lay out the surplus (if any) of the monies arising by such sale in the purchase of lands to be settled to the same uses.
Port of London Improvement and City Canal Act 1799 or the West India Dock Act 1799 (repealed)	39 Geo. 3. c. lxix	12 July 1799
An act for rendering more commodious, and for better regulating, the port of London. (Repealed by Thames Conservancy Act 1894 (57 & 58 Vict. c. clxxxvii))
Grimsby Haven Navigation and Improvement Act 1799 (repealed)	39 Geo. 3. c. lxx	12 July 1799
An act for enabling the Grimsby haven company to finish and complete the navigation of the said haven, and for amending an act passed in the thirty-sixth year of the reign of his present Majesty, (Note: Great Grimsby (Lincoln) Harbour Act 1796 (36 Geo. 3. c. 98)) for widening, deepening, enlarging, altering, and improving, the haven of the town and port of Great Grimsby, in the county of Lincoln. (Repealed by Grimsby Docks Act 1845 (8 & 9 Vict. c. ccii))
Forth and Clyde Navigation Company and Crinan Canal Company Act 1799	39 Geo. 3. c. lxxi	12 July 1799
An act for empowering the company of proprietors of the Forth and Clyde navigation to repay, into the court of exchequer in Scotland, the sum advanced to them for the purpose of completing the said navigation; for repealing so much of an act, of the twenty-fourth year of his present Majesty, as relates to the said company; and for enabling the barons of the said court of exchequer to advance part of the sum so to be received to the company of proprietors of the Crinan Canal, on certain conditions.
Cradley Chapel Patronage Act 1799	39 Geo. 3. c. lxxii	12 July 1799
An act for settling the right of patronage or presentation of or to the new chapel of Cradley, in that part of the parish of Halesowen which lies in the county and diocese of Worcester, and for other purposes.
Gravesend and Tilbury Tunnel Act 1799	39 Geo. 3. c. lxxiii	12 July 1799
An act for making and maintaining a tunnel, or road, under the river Thames, from or near to the town of Gravesend, in the county of Kent, to or near to Tilbury Fort, in the county of Essex.
Charles Street (Westminster) Act 1799 (repealed)	39 Geo. 3. c. lxxiv	12 July 1799
An act for making a new street from the Haymarket into Charles Street, St. James's Square, within the city and liberty of Westminster. (Repealed by Statute Law (Repeals) Act 2013 (c. 2))
Cheadle and Quickshill Bank and Bear's Brook and Rocester Roads Act 1799	39 Geo. 3. c. lxxv	12 July 1799
An act for amending, widening, altering, and keeping in repair, the road leading from Cheadle, through Alveton, to the Uttoxeter and Ashborne turnpike road, at or near Quickhill Bank; and also the road leading from the Stone and Uttoxeter turnpike road, at Bear's Brook, through Hollington, to the said Uttoxeter and Ashborne turnpike road, at or near the Churnet Bridge at Rocester, in the county of Stafford, to continue in force for twenty-one years, and from thence to the end of the then next session of parliament.
Asthall and Buckland Road Act 1799 (repealed)	39 Geo. 3. c. lxxvi	12 July 1799
An act to continue for twenty-one years, and from thence to the end of the then next session of parliament, the term and powers of an act, passed in the seventeenth year of the reign of his present Majesty, intituled, "An act for amending, widening, and keeping in repair, the road leading from the turnpike road, in the parish of Asthall, in the county of Oxford, to the turnpike road at or Bier Buckland, in the county of Berks." (Note: Asthall to Buckland Road Act 1777 (17 Geo. 3. c. 105)) (Repealed by Asthall and Buckland Road Act 1852 (15 & 16 Vict. c. cxxxix))
Lawton and Cranage Green Road Act 1799 (repealed)	39 Geo. 3. c. lxxvii	12 July 1799
An act for continuing for twenty-one years, and from thence to the end of the then next session of parliament, the term, and enlarging the powers, of three acts, passed in the fourth (Note: Cheshire Roads Act 1730 (4 Geo. 2. c. 3)) and twenty-fourth (Note: Lawton and Cranage Road Act 1750 (24 Geo. 2. c. 33)) years of the reign of his late majesty King George the Second, and in the seventeenth year of the reign of his present Majesty, (Note: Chester Roads Act 1777 (17 Geo. 3. c. 76)) for repairing the roads leading from the most southern part of Butt Lane, (Note: Butt Lane in north Staffordshire. 53°04′53″N 2°15′43″W) in the parish of Lawton, in the county palatine of Chester, to Lawton, and from thence to Henshall's Smithy, upon Cranage Green, (Note: Cranage in Cheshire. 53°13′33″N 2°22′53″W) in the said county. (Repealed by Roads to and from Lawton (Cheshire) Act 1820 (1 Geo. 4. c. xxxviii))
Skipton and Knaresborough Road Act 1799	39 Geo. 3. c. lxxviii	12 July 1799
An act for continuing for twenty-one years, and from thence to the end of the then next session of parliament, the term, and altering the powers, of an act, made in the seventeenth year of his present Majesty's reign, (Note: Yorks Roads (No. 5) Act 1777 (17 Geo. 3. c. 102)) for repairing the road from the town of Skipton to the turnpike road from Leeds to Ripon, near Okbeck, in the township of Bilton with Harrowgate, and from thence to the road leading from Knaresborough to Wetherby, in the west riding of the county of York.
Poyntz's Estate Act 1799	39 Geo. 3. c. lxxix	12 July 1799
An act for enabling William Stephen Poyntz esquire, and the honourable Elizabeth Mary his wife, to charge the estates late of the right honourable George Samuel lord viscount Montague, deceased, in the county of Sussex, with a competent sum of money for improving the same, and for other purposes.
Whalley Rectory Partition Act 1799	39 Geo. 3. c. lxxx	12 July 1799
An act for confirming and rendering effectual a partition and division between the late honourable Penn Assheton Curzon deceased, and the right honourable Thomas lord Ribblesdale (then Thomas Lister esquire) of the rectory of Whalley, and of the chapels, glebe lands, messuages, tenements, tythes, obventions, profits, and hereditaments thereto belonging, now held under a lease from the lord archbishop of Canterbury, and for that purpose to enable the said lord archbishop and his successors, at all times hereafter, to grant the said rectory and premises by two several leases, according to the said partition and division.
St. Mary-le-Bow Lecturer's Trust Act 1799 (repealed)	39 Geo. 3. c. lxxxi	12 July 1799
An act for vesting a piece of ground and hereditaments in the parish of Saint Mary Woolnoth, in the city of London, belonging to the parish of Saint Mary le Bow, in Abraham Robarts, William Curtis, Ellis Were, and Charles Hornyold, of the said city of London, bankers and co-partners, in fee simple, upon payment of the sum of one thousand three hundred and fifty pounds, upon trust, to be applied in the manner therein mentioned, for the support of a lecturer, and for better regulating the appointment of the said lecturer. (Repealed by Statute Law (Repeals) Act 2013 (c. 2))
Westminster Court House Act 1799 (repealed)	39 Geo. 3. c. lxxxii	12 July 1799
An act to amend an act, made in the eighteenth year of the reign of his present Majesty, (Note: Westminster (Improvement) Act 1778 (18 Geo. 3. c. 72)) for erecting a building for holding the courts, and exercising the jurisdiction, of the dean and chapter of the collegiate church of Saint Peter, in Westminster, and for holding the quarter sessions of the peace, and transacting the other publick business of the said city and liberty. (Repealed by Statute Law (Repeals) Act 2008 (c. 12))
Globe Insurance Company Act 1799	39 Geo. 3. c. lxxxiii	12 July 1799
An act for enabling his Majesty to incorporate, by charter, a company to be called The Globe Insurance Company, for insurance on lives, and against loss or damage by fire, and for other purposes therein mentioned.

=== Private acts ===
Short title	Citation	Royal assent
Long title
Shropham Inclosure Act 1799	39 Geo. 3. c. 1 Pr.	4 January 1799
An act for dividing, allotting, and inclosing the whole year lands, common fields, half year or shack lands, commons, and waste lands, within the parish of Shropham, in the County of Norfolk.
Jull's Name Act 1799	39 Geo. 3. c. 2 Pr.	4 January 1799
An act to enable Thomas Jull, of Ash, next Sandwich, in the county of Kent, esquire, and his issue, to assume and take the surname of Godfrey only, and to bear the arms and crests of the Godfreys, pursuant to the directions contained in a codicil to the will of Thomas Godfrey, late of London, merchant, deceased.
Hennings' Naturalization Act 1799	39 Geo. 3. c. 3 Pr.	9 January 1799
An act for naturalizing Charles Frederick Hennings.
Teschemacher's Naturalization Act 1799	39 Geo. 3. c. 4 Pr.	9 January 1799
An act for naturalizing John Roger Teschemacher.
Castellain's Naturalization Act 1799	39 Geo. 3. c. 5 Pr.	9 January 1799
An act for naturalizing Hermenegild Augustus Maria Castellain.
Martin's Naturalization Act 1799	39 Geo. 3. c. 6 Pr.	9 January 1799
An act for naturalizing John Alexander Martin.
Heyman's Naturalization Act 1799	39 Geo. 3. c. 7 Pr.	9 January 1799
An act for naturalizing John Everard Heyman.
Schick's Naturalization Act 1799	39 Geo. 3. c. 8 Pr.	9 January 1799
An act for naturalizing Anthony Schick.
Gries' Naturalization Act 1799	39 Geo. 3. c. 9 Pr.	9 January 1799
An act for naturalizing John Lawrence Gries.
Kent's Naturalization Act 1799	39 Geo. 3. c. 10 Pr.	9 January 1799
An act for naturalizing Adolphus Kent.
Wicke's Naturalization Act 1799	39 Geo. 3. c. 11 Pr.	9 January 1799
An act for naturalizing Johann George Wicke.
Ricketts's Divorce Act 1799	39 Geo. 3. c. 12 Pr.	7 March 1799
An act for dissolving the marriage of Edward Jervis Ricketts esquire, with the honourable Cassandra Twisleton, and to enable him to marry again; and for other purposes therein mentioned.
Papillon's Naturalization Act 1799	39 Geo. 3. c. 13 Pr.	7 March 1799
An act for naturalizing Pierre Jacques Papillon and Pierre François Papillon.
Moller's Naturalization Act 1799	39 Geo. 3. c. 14 Pr.	7 March 1799
An act for naturalizing George Christopher Moller.
Molesworth Inclosure Act 1799	39 Geo. 3. c. 15 Pr.	21 March 1799
An act for dividing, allotting, and inclosing, the open and common fields, meadows, commonable lands, and waste grounds, in the parish of Molesworth, in the county of Huntingdon.
Rackheath Inclosure Act 1799	39 Geo. 3. c. 16 Pr.	21 March 1799
An act for dividing, allotting, and inclosing, the commons and waste grounds, within the parish of Rackheath, in the county of Norfolk.
Leintwardine, Burrington, Downton, Aston and Elton (Herefordshire) Inclosure Act 1799	39 Geo. 3. c. 17 Pr.	21 March 1799
An act for dividing and allotting certain waste lands, and open and common fields, within the parishes of Leintwardine, Burrington, Downton, Aston, and Elton in the county of Hereford.
Oare Inclosure Act 1799	39 Geo. 3. c. 18 Pr.	21 March 1799
An act for dividing and allotting several open and common lands and grounds, within the tithing of Oare, in the parishes of Wilcot and Huish, in the county of Wilts.
Remenham Inclosure Act 1799	39 Geo. 3. c. 19 Pr.	21 March 1799
An act for dividing, allotting, and enclosing, the open and commonable fields, common meadows, and other commonable lands and grounds, in the parish of Remenham, in the county of Berks.
Nether Seal and Over Seal (Leicestershire, Derbyshire) Inclosure Act 1799	39 Geo. 3. c. 20 Pr.	21 March 1799
An act for confirming and establishing a division and inclosure of the open and common fields and pastures, within the manors or lordships of Nether Seal and Over Seal, in the parish of Nether Seal, in the counties of Leicester and Derby, or one of them, and certain exchanges of lands and estates within the said parish.
Williams' Divorce Act 1799	39 Geo. 3. c. 21 Pr.	21 March 1799
An act to dissolve the marriage of William Williams with Mary Charlotte his now wife, late Mary Charlott Willis, and to enable him to marry again; and for other purposes therein mentioned.
Bitterman's Naturalization Act 1799	39 Geo. 3. c. 22 Pr.	21 March 1799
An act for naturalizing Godfrey Bitterman.
Lange's Naturalization Act 1799	39 Geo. 3. c. 23 Pr.	21 March 1799
An act for naturalizing Salomon Lauge.
Witke's Naturalization Act 1799	39 Geo. 3. c. 24 Pr.	21 March 1799
An act for naturalizing Christian John Adam Witke.
Bong's Naturalization Act 1799	39 Geo. 3. c. 25 Pr.	21 March 1799
An act for naturalizing George Bong.
Marindin's Naturalization Act 1799	39 Geo. 3. c. 26 Pr.	21 March 1799
An act for naturalizing John Philip Marindin.
De Luc's Naturalization Act 1799	39 Geo. 3. c. 27 Pr.	21 March 1799
An act for naturalizing John De Luc.
Audra's Naturalization Act 1799	39 Geo. 3. c. 28 Pr.	21 March 1799
An act for naturalizing Justin Eliza Cæsar Audra.
Papillon's Naturalization Act 1799	39 Geo. 3. c. 29 Pr.	21 March 1799
An act for naturalizing Adrien Charles Papillon.
Braun's Naturalization Act 1799	39 Geo. 3. c. 30 Pr.	21 March 1799
An act for naturalizing Lorents Braun.
Hevingham, &c. Inclosure Act 1799	39 Geo. 3. c. 31 Pr.	10 April 1799
An act for dividing, allotting, and enclosing, the open, and common fields, half year or shack lands, warrens or reputed warrens, commons, heaths, commonable lands, and waste grounds, within the parishes of Hevingham and Marsham, in the county of Norfolk; and for extinguishing all rights of sheepwalk, shackage, and common, in, over, and upon, all the lands and grounds within the said parishes.
Bromsgrove Inclosure Act 1799	39 Geo. 3. c. 32 Pr.	19 April 1799
An act for dividing, allotting, and enclosing, the commons and waste lands within the manor of Bromsgrove, in the county of Worcester.
Ricketts's Divorce Act 1799	39 Geo. 3. c. 33 Pr.	19 April 1799
An act to dissolve the marriage of William Henty Rickets esquire, with the right honourable lady Elizabeth Jane Lambart, and to enable him to marry again; and for other purposes therein mentioned.
Migault's Naturalization Act 1799	39 Geo. 3. c. 34 Pr.	19 April 1799
An act for naturalizing John Gabriel Migault.
Humbert's Naturalization Act 1799	39 Geo. 3. c. 35 Pr.	19 April 1799
An act for naturalizing John Daniel Humbert.
Rigaud's Naturalization Act 1799	39 Geo. 3. c. 36 Pr.	19 April 1799
An act for naturalizing Charles Henry Rigaud.
Christin's Naturalization Act 1799	39 Geo. 3. c. 37 Pr.	19 April 1799
An act for naturalizing Francis Henry Christin.
Marchioness of Annandale's and Myrton's Estates Act 1799	39 Geo. 3. c. 38 Pr.	10 May 1799
An act for vesting certain parts of the lands and barony of Craigiehall, lying in the county of Linlithgow, and comprised in the deed of entail executed by the deceased Sophia marchioness of Annandale, with consent of William marquis of Annandale, her husband, upon the thirty-first July, one thousand seven hundred and eight; and also for vesting certain parts and parcels of the lands and barony of Leny, lying in the county of Edinburgh, and comprised in a disposition and deed of entail thereof, dated the third November one thousand seven hundred and forty-six, granted by sir Robert Myrton, of Gogar, baronet, with consent therein mentioned in trustees, in trust, to sell or exchange the same, and invest the money arising from such sale in the purchase or exchange of other lands to be settled and secured to the same series of heirs, and under the same conditions and limitations as are contained in the aforesaid deeds of entail; and for vesting in William Hope Weir esquire, of Craigiehall and Blackwood, and the same series of heirs, in fee tail, certain other parts of the said lands, baronies, and others.
Chipping Campden Inclosure Act 1799	39 Geo. 3. c. 39 Pr.	10 May 1799
An act for dividing, allotting, and inclosing, the open and common fields, meadows, pastures, downs, wastes, and other commonable lands, within the several hamlets or tithings of Berrington, Broad Campden, and Westington, in the parish of Chipping Campden, in the county of Gloucester.
Leigh Common Inclosure Act 1799	39 Geo. 3. c. 40 Pr.	10 May 1799
An act for dividing, allotting, and inclosing, a certain tract or piece of commonable land called Leigh Common, situate in the tything of Leigh, in the parish of Yetminster, in the county of Dorset.
Clevendon Inclosure Act 1799	39 Geo. 3. c. 41 Pr.	10 May 1799
An act for dividing, allotting, and inclosing, certain moors, commons, or waste lands, lying and being within the manor and parish of Clevendon, in the county of Somerset.
Keninghall Inclosure Act 1799	39 Geo. 3. c. 42 Pr.	10 May 1799
An act for dividing, allotting, and inclosing, the whole year lands, fen lands, heaths, commons, and waste grounds, within the parish of Keninghall, in the county of Norfolk.
Bressingham and Fersfield Inclosure Act 1799	39 Geo. 3. c. 43 Pr.	10 May 1799
An act for dividing, allotting, and inclosing, the lammas meadows, fen grounds, commons, and waste lands, within the parishes of Bressingham and Fersfield, in the county of Norfolk, and for extinguishing all rights of common, sheepwalk, and shackage, in, over, and upon, all the lands and grounds within the said parishes.
Easton Inclosure Act 1799	39 Geo. 3. c. 44 Pr.	10 May 1799
An act for dividing, allotting, and inclosing, the open common fields, common downs and all commonable places and waste lands, in the parish of Easton, in the county of Southampton.
Southill Inclosure (Amendment) Act 1799	39 Geo. 3. c. 45 Pr.	10 May 1799
An act to amend, and render more effectual, the power of exchange in an act, passed in the thirty-seventh year of his present Majesty's reign, intituled, "An act for dividing and inclosing the open and common fields, meadows, pastures, waste lands, and other commonable lands and grounds, in the parish of Southill, in the county of Bedford." (Note: Southill Inclosure Act 1797 (37 Geo. 3. c. 110 Pr.))
Great Ellingham Inclosure Act 1799	39 Geo. 3. c. 46 Pr.	10 May 1799
An act for dividing, allotting, and inclosing, the common fields, commons, and waste grounds, within the parish of Grsat Ellingham, in the county of Norfolk.
Horton Inclosure Act 1799	39 Geo. 3. c. 47 Pr.	10 May 1799
An act for dividing, allotting, and inclosing, the open and common fields, common meadows, common pastures, commonable lands, waste grounds, within the parish and manor of Horton, in the county of Buckingham.
Marquis of Abercorn's Divorce Act 1799	39 Geo. 3. c. 48 Pr.	10 May 1799
An act to dissolve the marriage of the most honourable John James marquis of Abercorn, with the most honourable Cecil Hamilton his now wife, and to enable him to marry again; and for other purposes therein mentioned.
Stanton's Divorce Act 1799	39 Geo. 3. c. 49 Pr.	10 May 1799
An act to dissolve the marriage of Join Stanton with Sarah Wright, his now wife, and to enable him to marry again; and for other purposes therein mentioned.
Nassau's Naturalization Act 1799	39 Geo. 3. c. 50 Pr.	10 May 1799
An act for naturalizing Catherine Nassau.
Von dem Busch's Naturalization Act 1799	39 Geo. 3. c. 51 Pr.	10 May 1799
An act for naturalizing Henry von dem Busch.
Bielfeld's Naturalization Act 1799	39 Geo. 3. c. 52 Pr.	10 May 1799
An act for naturalizing Diederick Arnold Bielfeld.
Berthoud's Naturalization Act 1799	39 Geo. 3. c. 53 Pr.	10 May 1799
An act for naturalizing Henry Berthoud.
Bellbroughton Inclosure Act 1799	39 Geo. 3. c. 54 Pr.	20 May 1799
An act for dividing, allotting, and inclosing, certain commons, waste lands, and commonable places, within the manors of Forfield, Bromhill, Bellbroughton, and Brians Bell, in the parish oi Bellbroughton, in the county of Worcester.
Rowley Regis Inclosure Act 1799	39 Geo. 3. c. 55 Pr.	20 May 1799
An act for dividing, allotting, and inclosing, the commons, waste lands, and commonable places, within the parish of Rowley Regis, in the county of Stafford.
Duke of Bedford's Estate Act 1799	39 Geo. 3. c. 56 Pr.	13 June 1799
An act for vesting divers lands and hereditaments in the county of Bucks, entailed by the will of John late duke of Bedford in Francis duke of Bedford, in fee simple, and for settling other estates in the said county of greater value in lieu thereof.
Clutterbuck's Estate Act 1799	39 Geo. 3. c. 57 Pr.	13 June 1799
An act for vesting part of the settled estates of Robert Clutterbuck esquire, in trustees, to be sold, and for applying part of the money arising therefrom, under the direction of the court of chancery, in manner, and for the purposes therein mentioned, and for laying out the residue in the purchase of other estates, to be settled in lieu thereof, and to the same uses.
Lewis Haussoullier's and Tryphena Trist's Estates Act 1799	39 Geo. 3. c. 58 Pr.	13 June 1799
An act for confirming, and rendering effectual, a partition between Lewis John Marie Haussoullier esquire, and Tryphena Trist spinster, an infant, of divers manors, boroughs, lands, and hereditaments, in the county of Devon.
Dunbar's Estate Act 1799	39 Geo. 3. c. 59 Pr.	13 June 1799
An act for empowering the judges of the court of session in Scotland to sell such part or parts of the estate of Machermore, in the stewartry of Kircudbright, which belong to Patrick Dunbar, late of Machermore, esquire, as shall be sufficient for the payment of the debts of the said Patrick Dunbar, and his predecessors, and the sums with which he charged the said estate.
Greens Norton and Duncott Inclosure Act 1799	39 Geo. 3. c. 60 Pr.	13 June 1799
An act for dividing and inclosing the open and common fields, common meadows, common pastures, and other commonable lands and grounds, within the liberties and precincts of Greens Norton, and hamlet of Duncott, in the parish of Greens Norton, in the county of Northampton.
Charlton Marshall Inclosure Act 1799	39 Geo. 3. c. 61 Pr.	13 June 1799
An act for dividing, allotting, and inclosing, the open fields, meadows, downs, marshes, commonable lands, and waste grounds, within the parish of Charlton Marshall, in the county of Dorset.
Mappowder Inclosure Act 1799	39 Geo. 3. c. 62 Pr.	13 June 1799
An act for dividing and inclosing the commons and commonable lands in the parish of Mapowder, in the county of Dorset.
Hirst Courtney in Birkin (Yorkshire, West Riding) Inclosure Act 1799	39 Geo. 3. c. 63 Pr.	13 June 1799
An a ctfor dividing, allotting, and inclosing, the open common fields, ings, marsh, and waste grounds, within the township of Hirst Courtney, in the parish of Birkin, in the west riding of the county of York.
Purton Inclosure Act 1799	39 Geo. 3. c. 64 Pr.	13 June 1799
An act for dividing, allotting, and inclosing, the open and common fields, and other commonable lands, in the parish of Purton, otherwise Puriton, in the county of Wilts.
Church Staunton Inclosure Act 1799	39 Geo. 3. c. 65 Pr.	13 June 1799
An act for dividing, allotting, and inclosing, all the commons and waste lands and grounds within the parish of Church Staunton, in the county of Devon.
Sherborne Inclosure Act 1799	39 Geo. 3. c. 66 Pr.	13 June 1799
An act for dividing, allotting, and inclosing, the open and common fields, and common or commonable meadows, pastures, lands, and grounds, and common or waste lands, within the parish of Sherborne, in the county of Warwick.
Honington Inclosure Act 1799	39 Geo. 3. c. 67 Pr.	13 June 1799
An act for dividing, allotting, and inclosing, the common fields, half year or shack lands, common meadows, heaths, commonable lands, commons, and waste grounds, within the parish of Honington, in the county of Suffolk.
Ranworth Inclosure Act 1799	39 Geo. 3. c. 68 Pr.	13 June 1799
An act for confirming and establishing the division, allotment, and inclosure, of certain whole year lands, common fields, half year or shack lands, commons, and waste grounds, in the parish of Ranworth, in the county of Norfolk.
Weardale in Stanhope (Durham) Inclosure Act 1799	39 Geo. 3. c. 69 Pr.	13 June 1799
An act for dividing, allotting, and otherwise improving, several stinted moors, stinted pastures, wastes, and other commonable lands and grounds, within the park and forest of Weardale, in the parish of Stanhope, in the county of Durham.
Ulverstone Inclosure Act 1799	39 Geo. 3. c. 70 Pr.	13 June 1799
An act for dividing and inclosing the commons, waste grounds, and mosses, within the town and hamlet of Ulverstone, in the parish of Ulverstone, in the county palatine of Lancaster.
Moorgate in Clarbrough (Nottinghamshire) Inclosure Act 1799	39 Geo. 3. c. 71 Pr.	13 June 1799
An act for dividing, allotting, and inclosing, the commons and waste grounds, and stinted pastures, within the hamlet of Moorgate, in the parish of Clarbrough, in the county of Nottingham.
South Brent and Lympsham (Somerset) Inclosure Act 1799	39 Geo. 3. c. 72 Pr.	13 June 1799
An act for dividing, allotting, and inclosing, certain moors, commons, and waste lands, lying and being within the parishes of South Brent and Lympsham, in the county of Somerset.
Water Eaton Inclosure Act 1799	39 Geo. 3. c. 73 Pr.	13 June 1799
An act for dividing and inclosing the commons and waste lands within the manor of Water Eaton, in the county of Stafford.
Harworth Inclosure Act 1799	39 Geo. 3. c. 74 Pr.	13 June 1799
An act for dividing, allotting, and inclosing, the open and common fields, meadows, pastures, commons, and waste grounds, within the township and liberty of Harworth, in the county of Nottingham.
Cheshunt Inclosure Act 1799	39 Geo. 3. c. 75 Pr.	13 June 1799
An act for dividing, allotting, and inclosing, the open and common fields, common lammas meadows, and a certain common called Cheshunt Common, within the parish of Cheshunt, in the county of Hertford.
Stratford-under-the-Castle and Milford Inclosure Act 1799	39 Geo. 3. c. 76 Pr.	13 June 1799
An act for dividing and allotting the open and common fields, and other commonable lands and grounds, in the parishes of Stratford-under-the-Castle and Milford, in the county of Wilts.
Peard's Divorce Act 1799	39 Geo. 3. c. 77 Pr.	13 June 1799
An act to dissolve the marriage of Shuldham Peard esquire, with Elizabeth his now wife, late Elizabeth Bligh, and to enable him to marry again; and for other purposes therein mentioned.
Thoroton's Divorce Act 1799	39 Geo. 3. c. 78 Pr.	13 June 1799
An act to dissolve the marriage of Jobn Thoroton clerk, with Elizabeth his now wife, and to enable him to marry again; and for other purposes therein mentioned.
Naturalization of Maria Gro'schner alias Huntley Act 1799	39 Geo. 3. c. 79 Pr.	13 June 1799
An act for naturalizing Maria Gro'schner, otherwise Huntley.
D'Escury's Naturalization Act 1799	39 Geo. 3. c. 80 Pr.	13 June 1799
An act for naturalizing Simon Jacob Charles Collet D'Escury.
Korff's Naturalization Act 1799	39 Geo. 3. c. 81 Pr.	13 June 1799
An act for naturalizing William Conrad Korff.
Cuvelje's Naturalization Act 1799	39 Geo. 3. c. 82 Pr.	13 June 1799
An act for naturalizing Abraham Zimon Doncker Cuvelje.
Grasthorpe Inclosure Act 1799	39 Geo. 3. c. 83 Pr.	21 June 1799
An act for dividing, allotting, and inclosing, the open arable fields, open meadows, common pastures, common grounds, and waste grounds, in the township of Grasthorpe, in the county of Nottingham.
Houghton and South Stoke Inclosure Act 1799	39 Geo. 3. c. 84 Pr.	21 June 1799
An act for dividing, allotting, and inclosing, the open and common fields, meadows, pastures, common, and waste lands, within the parishes of Houghton and South Stoke, in the county of Sussex.
Long Preston Inclosure and Drainage Act 1799	39 Geo. 3. c. 85 Pr.	21 June 1799
An act for dividing and inclosing several open fields and stinted pastures within the township of Long Preston, in the parish of Long Preston, in the west riding of the county of York, and for embanking and draining several parcels of ground within the same township, called Long Preston Ings.
Knayton Inclosure Act 1799	39 Geo. 3. c. 86 Pr.	21 June 1799
An act for dividing and inclosing a moor or common called Knayton Moor, and other waste lands, within the township of Knayton, and parish of Leek, in the north riding of the county of York.
Sandall Magna, Walton and Crigglestone (Yorkshire, West Riding) Inclosure Act 1799	39 Geo. 3. c. 87 Pr.	21 June 1799
An act for dividing, allotting, and inclosing, the common fields, undivided enclosures, commons, waste grounds, and commonable places, within the townships of Sandall Magna, Walton, and Crigglestone, in the parish of Sandall Magna, in the west riding of the county of York.
Walton Inclosure Act 1799	39 Geo. 3. c. 88 Pr.	21 June 1799
An act for dividing, allotting, and inclosing, the open and common fields, common meadows, common pastures, and other commonable and waste lands, grounds, and places, within the hamlet of Walton, in the parish of Aylesbury, in the county of Buckingham.
Lyddington with Caldecott, and Uppingham (Rutland) Inclosure etc. Act 1799	39 Geo. 3. c. 89 Pr.	21 June 1799
An act for dividing, allotting, inclosing, and improving, divers open and common fields, common meadows, common pastures, and other commonable lands and waste grounds, within the several parishes of Lyddington with Caldecott and Uppingham, in the county of Rutland, and also a common or waste within the same county, called Uppingham Brand; and for extinguishing all the tythes arising within the same parishes, and all the deer browse and rights of common upon Beaumont Chace, in the same county; and making a compensation for such tythes and common rights respectively.
Althorpe Inclosure Act 1799	39 Geo. 3. c. 90 Pr.	21 June 1799
An act to amend an act, passed in the thirty-fourth year of the reign of his present Majesty, (Note: Althorpe Inclosure Act 1794 (34 Geo. 3. c. 92 Pr.)) for dividing and inclosing the open fields and common in the township of Althorpe, in the county of Lincoln, and for draining the same and certain inclosed lands within the said township.
Carlton-cum-Willingham Inclosure Act 1799	39 Geo. 3. c. 91 Pr.	21 June 1799
An act for dividing, allotting, and enclosing, the open and common fields, commons, wastes, and other commonable lands and grounds, in the parish of Carbon cum Willingham, in the county of Cambridge, and for extinguishing the tythes in the same parish.
Long's Estate Act 1799	39 Geo. 3. c. 92 Pr.	1 July 1799
An act for vesting part of the settled estate of Richard Long esquire, deceased, in trustees, to be conveyed pursuant to articles entered into for the sale thereof, and for applying the money arising therefrom for the several purposes therein mentioned.
Every's Estate Act 1799	39 Geo. 3. c. 93 Pr.	1 July 1799
An act for vesting the inheritance in fee simple of part of the settled estates of sir Henry Every baronet, in trustees, in trust to make sale thereof, and to apply the money produced by such sale, or a competent part thereof, in payment and discharge of divers debts, charges, and incumbrances, affecting the same, and to invest the surplus of such money, (if any such shall be) in the purchase of other lands or hereditaments to be settled to the same uses.
Watton-under-Edge Grammar School and Owen's Estate Act 1799	39 Geo. 3. c. 94 Pr.	1 July 1799
An act for effecting an exchange of lands between the trustees of the free grammar school in Watton under Edge, in the county of Gloucester, and Nicholas Owen Smythe Owen esquire.
Pattingham and Patshull Inclosure Act 1799	39 Geo. 3. c. 95 Pr.	1 July 1799
An act for dividing, allotting, and inclosing, the arable lands, intermixed fields, meadows and pastures, commons and waste grounds, within the respective manors of Pattingbam and Patshull, in the county of Stafford.
Gosberton Inclosure Act 1799	39 Geo. 3. c. 96 Pr.	1 July 1799
An act for dividing, allotting, and inclosing, the common, fen droves, and waste lands, in the parish of Gosberton, in the county of Lincoln.
Yarkhill, Weston Beggard, Dormington and Stoke Edith (Herefordshire) Inclosure Act 1799	39 Geo. 3. c. 97 Pr.	1 July 1799
An act for dividing, allotting, and inclosing, the open fields, meadows, and pastures, within the parishes of Yarkhill, Weston Beggard, Dormington, with the chapelry of Bartestree, in the said parish of Dormington and Stoke Edith, with the chapelry of Westhide, in the said parish of Stoke Edith, all in the county of Hereford.
Axbridge Inclosure Act 1799	39 Geo. 3. c. 98 Pr.	1 July 1799
An act for dividing, allotting, and inclosing, the several moors, commons, and waste lands, lying and being within the parish of Axbridge, in the county of Somerset.
Brayton Inclosure Act 1799	39 Geo. 3. c. 99 Pr.	1 July 1799
An act for dividing, allotting, and inclosing the open common fields, commons, and waste grounds, within the several manors or townships of Brayton, Thorp Willowby, Burton, and Gateforth with Lund, in the parish of Brayton, in the west riding of the county of York.
Tuxford Inclosure Act 1799	39 Geo. 3. c. 100 Pr.	1 July 1799
An act to divide, allot, inclose, and improve, the several open fields, commons, and waste grounds, and other open and uninclosed lands, in the parish of Tuxford, in the county of Nottingham.
Teddington Inclosure Act 1799	39 Geo. 3. c. 101 Pr.	1 July 1799
An act for dividing, allotting, and otherwise improving, all the common fields commons, wastes, and other commonable lands and grounds, within the manor and parish of Teddington, otherwise Todington, otherwise Tettington, otherwise Tuddington, in the county of Middlesex.
Parker's Divorce Act 1799	39 Geo. 3. c. 102 Pr.	1 July 1799
An act to dissolve the marriage of sir Hyde Parker knight, with Ann Boteler, his now wife, and to enable him to marry again; and for other purposes therein mentioned.
Campbell's Divorce Act 1799	39 Geo. 3. c. 103 Pr.	1 July 1799
An act to dissolve the marriage of Charles Collins Campbell esquire, a major in the army, with Harriett Fraser, his now wife, and to enable him to marry again; and for other purposes therein mentioned.
Buller's Divorce Act 1799	39 Geo. 3. c. 104 Pr.	1 July 1799
An act to dissolve the marriage of John Buller, of Calcutta, in the province of Bengal, in the East Indies, esquire, with Eliza Catherine Wiggens, his now wife, and to enable him to marry again; and for other purposes therein mentioned.
Reinaud's Naturalization Act 1799	39 Geo. 3. c. 105 Pr.	1 July 1799
An act for naturalizing John Lewis Reinaud.
Behrends' Naturalization Act 1799	39 Geo. 3. c. 106 Pr.	1 July 1799
An act for naturalizing Philipp Fredrick Behrends.
Count Byland's Naturalization Act 1799	39 Geo. 3. c. 107 Pr.	1 July 1799
An act for naturalizing Francis Louis count Byland.
Lindsay's Estate Act 1799	39 Geo. 3. c. 108 Pr.	12 July 1799
An act for enabling trustees to convey, pursuant to a contract of sale already entered into, an estate at Charleywood, in the parish of Rickmersworth, in the county of Herts, late belonging to sir David Lindsay baronet, deceased, devised, in strict settlement, by a codicil to his will; and for laying out the money arising therefrom in the purchase of other estates, to be settled to the same uses, with power of leasing the estates to be settled.
Kempsford and Dryffield Inclosure Act 1799	39 Geo. 3. c. 109 Pr.	12 July 1799
An act tor dividing, allotting, and inclosing, the open and common fields, common meadows, common pastures, and waste lands, within the parishes of Kempsford and Dryffield, in the county of Gloucester.
King's Bromley Inclosure Act 1799	39 Geo. 3. c. 110 Pr.	12 July 1799
An act for dividing, allotting, and inclosing, the commons or waste grounds within or belonging to the manor of King's Bromley, and also certain open meadows or lands within the parish or manor of King's Bromley, aforesaid, in the county of Stafford.
Cumberworth Inclosure Act 1799	39 Geo. 3. c. 111 Pr.	12 July 1799
An act of dividing, allotting, and enclosing, the several commons, moors, and waste grounds within the manor of Cumberworth, with Cumberworth Half, in the parishes of Silkstone and Kirkburton, in the west riding of the county of York.
North Crossland in Almondbury (Yorkshire, West Riding) Inclosure Act 1799	39 Geo. 3. c. 112 Pr.	12 July 1799
An act for dividing, allotting, and inclosing, the several commons, moors, and waste grounds, within the manor of North Crossland, in the parish of Almondbury, in the west riding of the county of York.
Kirkheaton Inclosure Act 1799	39 Geo. 3. c. 113 Pr.	12 July 1799
An act for inclosing and leasing, or letting, certain common moors and waste grounds lying within the township of Kirkheaton, in the west riding of the county of York, and applying the profits thereof in aid of the poors rate, highway rate, and church rate, within the said township; and for confirming and establishing the division, allotments, and inclosure, of the open and uninclosed fields, and also several exchanges of lands within the said township.
Dalton Inclosure Act 1799	39 Geo. 3. c. 114 Pr.	12 July 1799
An act for dividing, allotting, and enclosing, the several commons and waste lands within the manor and township of Dalton in the parish of Kirkheaton, in the west riding of the county of York.
Worlington Inclosure Act 1799	39 Geo. 3. c. 115 Pr.	12 July 1799
An act for dividing and allotting the whole year or every year lands, common fields, half year or shack lands, common meadows, heaths, warrens, fens, commons, and waste grounds, within the parish of Worlington, in the county of Suffolk.
Singleborough Inclosure Act 1799	39 Geo. 3. c. 116 Pr.	12 July 1799
An act for dividing, allotting, and enclosing the open and common fields, and other commonable lands, commons, and waste grounds, within the manor and hamlet of Singleborough, in the parish of Great Horwood, in the county of Buckingham.
Grantchester and Coton Inclosure Act 1799	39 Geo. 3. c. 117 Pr.	12 July 1799
An act for dividing, allotting, and inclosing, the open and common fields, common meadows, and other open and commonable lands and waste grounds, lying in the parishes of Grantchester and Coton, in the county of Cambridge.
Wyrardisbury Inclosure Act 1799	39 Geo. 3. c. 118 Pr.	12 July 1799
An act for dividing, allotting, and inclosing, the open and common fields, common meadows, commons, and waste grounds, within the parish and manor of Wyrardisbury, otherwise Wraisbury, in the county of Buckingham.
Naturalization of George Erck Act 1799	39 Geo. 3. c. 119 Pr.	12 July 1799
An act for naturalizing George Erck.
Pampisford Inclosure Act 1799	39 Geo. 3. c. 120 Pr.	12 July 1799
An act for dividing, allotting, inclosing, and laying in severalty, the common and open fields, common meadows, commonable lands, commons, and waste grounds, within the parish of Pampisford, in the county of Cambridge.

=== Sources ===
- Pickering, Danby, ed. (1799). "Anno regni tricesimo nono Georgii III". The Statutes at Large. Vol. 42: Anno tricesimo nono Georgii III. Regis: Being the Third Session of the Eighteenth Parliament of Great Britain. Cambridge: John Burges. pp. 52–448 – via Internet Archive.
- "Anno tricesimo nono Georgii III". The Statutes at Large. Vol. 14/18: From the Thirty-ninth Year of the Reign of King George the Third To the End of the Fifth and Concluding Session of the Eighteenth and last Parliament of Great Britain held in the Forty-first Year of the Reign of King George the Third. London: Eyre and Strahan. 1800. pp. 1–263 – via Google Books.
- Journals of the House of Commons. Vol. 54. London: His Majesty's Stationery Office. 1803. pp. 3–744 – via Google Books.
- Chronological Table of and Index to the Statutes. Vol. 1: To the End of the Session 59 Vict. Sess. 2 (1895) (13th ed.). London: Her Majesty's Stationery Office. 1896. pp. 165–166 – via Google Books.
- "Acts of the Parliament of Great Britain from 1799". legislation.gov.uk. The National Archives.

== 39 & 40 Geo. 3 ==
The fourth session of the 18th Parliament of Great Britain, which met from 24 September 1799 until 29 July 1800.

=== Public general acts ===
Short title	Citation	Royal assent
Long title
Militia (No. 5) Act 1799 (repealed)	39 & 40 Geo. 3. c. 1	8 October 1799
An Act for enabling His Majesty to accept the Services of an additional Number of Volunteers from the Militia, under certain Restrictions. (Repealed by Militia Act 1802 (42 Geo. 3. c. 90))
Duties upon Malt, etc. Act 1799 (repealed)	39 & 40 Geo. 3. c. 2	12 October 1799
An Act for continuing and granting to his Majesty certain Duties upon Malt, Mum, Cyder, and Perry, for the Service of the Year on thousand eight hundred. (Repealed by Statute Law Revision Act 1871 (34 & 35 Vict. c. 116))
Duties on Pensions, etc. Act 1799 (repealed)	39 & 40 Geo. 3. c. 3	12 October 1799
An Act for continuing and granting to his Majesty a Duty on Pensions, Offices, and Personal Estates, in England, Wales, and the Town of Berwick-upon-Tweed, and certain Duties on Sugar, Malt, Tobacco, and Snuff, for the Service of the Year one thousand eight hundred. (Repealed by Statute Law Revision Act 1871 (34 & 35 Vict. c. 116))
Loans or Exchequer Bills Act 1799 (repealed)	39 & 40 Geo. 3. c. 4	12 October 1799
An Act for raising a certain Sum of Money, by Loans or Exchequer Bills, for the Service of the Year one thousand eight hundred; and for permitting Exchequer Bills, issued under an Act of the last Session of Parliament, (Note: Appropriation Act 1799 (39 Geo. 3. c. 114)) for granting to his Majesty a certain Sum of Money out of the Consolidated Fund, and for other Purposes, if not paid by a certain Day, to be received in Payment of any of the Branches of the Publick Revenue. (Repealed by Statute Law Revision Act 1871 (34 & 35 Vict. c. 116))
Loans for Relief of Certain Merchants Act 1799 (repealed)	39 & 40 Geo. 3. c. 5	12 October 1799
An Act for enabling his Majesty to direct the Issue of Exchequer Bills to a Limited Amount and in the Manner therein mentioned, for the Relief of the Merchants of Liverpool and Lancaster. (Repealed by Statute Law Revision Act 1871 (34 & 35 Vict. c. 116))
Exchequer Bills Act 1799 (repealed)	39 & 40 Geo. 3. c. 6	12 October 1799
An Act to enable the Lords Commissioners of His Majesty's Treasury to issue Exchequer Bills to a limited Amount, on the Credit of such Monies as may arise by virtue of an Act of the thirty-eighth Year of His present Majesty's Reign, (Note: Customs, etc. Act 1798 (38 Geo. 3. c. 76)) for granting certain additional Duties of Customs on Goods exported and imported, and on Tonnage of Ships entering Outwards or Inwards to or from Foreign Parts, until the signing the preliminary Articles of Peace; and upon an Act of last Session of Parliament for granting certain Duties upon Income. (Repealed by Statute Law Revision Act 1871 (34 & 35 Vict. c. 116))
Distillation from Wheat, etc. Act 1799 (repealed)	39 & 40 Geo. 3. c. 7	12 October 1799
An Act to prohibit, until the first Day of March one thousand eight hundred, the making of Low Wines or Spirits from Wheat, Barley, Malt, or other Sort of Grain, or from any Meal, Flour, or any Bran, in that Part of Great Britain called Scotland. (Repealed by Statute Law Revision Act 1871 (34 & 35 Vict. c. 116))
Duties on Spirits Act 1799 (repealed)	39 & 40 Geo. 3. c. 8	12 October 1799
An Act for reducing, until the first Day of June one thousand eight hundred, the Duties upon Spirits distilled from Melasses or Sugar, or any Mixture therewith; for prohibiting the Distillation of Spirits from Wheat or Wheat Flour; and for reducing, until the twentieth Day of September one thousand eight hundred, and better collecting the Duties payable on the Importation of Starch. (Repealed by Statute Law Revision Act 1871 (34 & 35 Vict. c. 116))
Continuance of Laws Act 1799 (repealed)	39 & 40 Geo. 3. c. 9	12 October 1799
An Act to continue, until the twentieth Day of February one thousand eight hundred, several Laws relating to the Prevention and Punishment of Attempts to seduce Persons serving in his Majesty's Forces; to the empowering his Majesty to accept the Services of such Parts of the Militia of this Kingdom as may offer to serve in Ireland; to the Admission of certain Articles of Merchandize in neutral Ships, and the issuing of Orders in Council for that Purpose; to the authorizing his Majesty to make Regulations respecting the Trade to the Cape of Good Hope; to the establishing Courts of Judicature in the Island of Newfoundland; to the enabling his Majesty to permit Goods to be imported into this Kingdom in neutral Ships; and to continue, until the thirtieth Day of September one thousand eight hundred, an Act of the last Session of Parliament, (Note: Importation (No. 3) Act 1799 (39 Geo. 3. c. 87)) for enabling his Majesty to prohibit the Exportation, and permit the Importation of Corn, and for allowing the Importation of other Articles of Provision, without Payment of Duty. (Repealed by Statute Law Revision Act 1871 (34 & 35 Vict. c. 116))
Land Tax Redemption (No. 5) Act 1799 (repealed)	39 & 40 Geo. 3. c. 10	12 October 1799
An Act to extend the Period, limited by an Act of the last Session of Parliament, (Note: Land Tax Redemption (No. 4) Act 1799 (39 Geo. 3. c. 108)) for the Benefit of Preference to certain Bodies, Companies, and Persons, in contracting for the Redemption of Land Tax, until the twenty-fifth Day of March one thousand eight hundred. (Repealed by Statute Law Revision Act 1871 (34 & 35 Vict. c. 116))
Appropriation of Certain Duties Act 1799 (repealed)	39 & 40 Geo. 3. c. 11	12 October 1799
An Act to amend so much of an Act, made in the last Session of Parliament, (Note: Duties on Income Act 1799 (39 Geo. 3. c. 13)) for granting certain Duties upon Income, as relates to the Appropriation of the said Duties and of the Duties upon Goods imported and exported, granted by an Act of the thirty-eighth Year of the Reign of his present Majesty. (Note: Taxation Act 1798 (38 Geo. 3. c. 16)) (Repealed by Statute Law Revision Act 1861 (24 & 25 Vict. c. 101))
Duties and Drawbacks Act 1799 (repealed)	39 & 40 Geo. 3. c. 12	12 October 1799
An Act to enable the Commissioners of the Customs to allow, until the first Day of April one thousand eight hundred, British Plantation Sugars to be warehoused; to revive so much of an Act, made in the thirty-second Year of the Reign of his present Majesty, (Note: Customs (No. 2) Act 1792 (32 Geo. 3. c. 43)) as relates to the ascertaining the average Price of Sugar, and regulating the Allowance of Drawback on the Exportation thereof; and for allowing, until the fifth Day of May one thousand eight hundred, certain Drawbacks on Sugar exported. (Repealed by Statute Law Revision Act 1871 (34 & 35 Vict. c. 116))
Loans to Grenada and Saint Vincent Traders Act 1799 (repealed)	39 & 40 Geo. 3. c. 13	12 October 1799
An Act for allowing further Time for the Payment of Instalments on certain Sums of Money advanced by way of Loan to several Persons connected with and trading to the Inlands of Grenada and Saint Vincent. (Repealed by Statute Law Revision Act 1871 (34 & 35 Vict. c. 116))
Meeting of Parliament Act 1799	39 & 40 Geo. 3. c. 14	12 October 1799
An Act for empowering his Majesty to shorten the Time for the Meeting of Parliament in cases of Adjournment.

=== Sources ===
- "Anno 39° and 40° Georgii III". The Statutes at Large: From Magna Carta, to the End of the Last Parliament. Eyre and Strahan. 1800. pp. 264–286 – via Google Books.
- Journals of the House of Commons. Vol. 55. London: His Majesty's Stationery Office. 1803. pp. 3–793 – via Google Books.
- Chronological Table of and Index to the Statutes. Vol. 1: To the End of the Session 59 Vict. Sess. 2 (1895) (13th ed.). London: Her Majesty's Stationery Office. 1896. pp. 166–168 – via Google Books.
- "Acts of the Parliament of Great Britain from 1799". legislation.gov.uk. The National Archives.

== See also ==
- List of acts of the Parliament of Great Britain
