= Habeas Corpus Suspension Act =

Habeas Corpus Suspension Act may refer to several acts of Parliament or acts of Congress relating to habeas corpus:

- Habeas Corpus Suspension Acts of 1688 of the Parliament of England
- Habeas Corpus Suspension Act 1745 of the Parliament of Great Britain
- Habeas Corpus Suspension Act 1776 of the Parliament of Great Britain
- Habeas Corpus Suspension Act 1794 of the Parliament of Great Britain
- Habeas Corpus Suspension Act 1798 of the Parliament of Great Britain
- Habeas Corpus Suspension Act 1799 of the Parliament of Great Britain
- Habeas Corpus Suspension Act 1817 of the Parliament of the United Kingdom
- Habeas Corpus Suspension Act (1863) of the United States Congress

== See also ==
- Habeas Corpus Act (disambiguation)
