= Habeas Corpus Act =

Habeas Corpus Act may refer to several Acts of Parliament and Acts of Congress relating to Habeas Corpus:

- Habeas Corpus Act 1640 (16 Cha I. c. 10) of the Parliament of England
- Habeas Corpus Act 1679 (31 Cha. 2 c. 2) of the Parliament of England
- Habeas Corpus Act 1816 (1816 c.100 56 Geo 3) of the Parliament of the United Kingdom
- Habeas Corpus Act 1862 (20 & 26 Vict. c.20) of the Parliament of the United Kingdom
- Habeas Corpus Act 1867 (sess. ii, chap. 28, Stat. 385) of the United States Congress

== See also ==
- Habeas Corpus Suspension Act (disambiguation)
