= Habeas Corpus Suspension Act 1794 =

Act of the Parliament of Great Britain

- Act of Parliament
- Parliament of Great Britain
- Long title: An Act to empower His Majesty to secure and detain such Persons as His Majesty shall inspect are conspiring against his Person and Government.
- Citation: 34 Geo. 3. c. 54
- Territorial extent: Great Britain

Dates
- Royal assent: 23 May 1794
- Commencement: 23 May 1794 (Note: The Acts of Parliament (Commencement) Act 1793.)
- Expired: 1 February 1795 (Note: Section 1.)
- Repealed: 21 August 1871
Other legislation
Amended by	Habeas Corpus Suspension Act 1795
Repealed by	Statute Law Revision Act 1871

Status: Repealed

Text of statute as originally enacted

The Habeas Corpus Suspension Act 1794 (34 Geo. 3. c. 54) was an act of the Parliament of Great Britain. The act's long title was An act to empower his Majesty to secure and detain such persons as his Majesty shall suspect are conspiring against his person and government.

== Provisions ==
The act declared:

Whereas a traitorous and detestable conspiracy has been formed for subverting the existing laws and constitution, and for introducing the system of anarchy and confusion which has so fatally prevailed in France: therefore, for the better preservation of his Majesty's sacred person, and for securing the peace and the laws and liberties of this kingdom; be it enacted...That every person or persons that are or shall be in prison within the kingdom of Great Britain at or upon the day on which this act shall receive his Majesty's royal assent, or after, by warrant of his said Majesty's most honourable privy council, signed by six of the said privy council, for high treason, suspicion of high treason, or treasonable practices, or by warrant, signed by any of his Majesty's secretaries of state, for such causes as aforesaid, may be detained in safe custody, without bail or main-prize, until the first day of February one thousand seven hundred and ninety-five; and that no judge or justice of the peace shall bail or try any such person or persons so committed, without order from his said Majesty's privy council signed by six of the said privy council, till the said first day of February one thousand seven hundred and ninety-five; any law or statute to the contrary notwithstanding...

Section 3 of the act preserved the privilege of Parliament.

== Background ==
Government spies had penetrated the Society for Constitutional Information, and were reporting a surge in its activity and much dangerous talk of a convention rather than parliamentary reform. France sent an agent to Ireland to assess the support a French invasion would have and the agent was arrested in late April 1795. On 12 May the secretary of the London Corresponding Society, Thomas Hardy, was arrested. The next day another radical, John Thelwall, was arrested and the Prime Minister, William Pitt, appointed a secret committee of the House of Commons to examine the confiscated papers of the London societies. Although this action only affected the London Corresponding Society directly, the Society of the Friends of the People and other similar societies disbanded out of fear because of this and similar actions taken by the government.

Habeas Corpus Suspension Act 1795
- Act of Parliament
- Parliament of Great Britain
- Long title: An Act to continue for a limited time an Act made in the last Session of Parliament, intituled, "An Act to empower His Majesty to secure and detain such Persons as His Majesty shall suspect are conspiring against his Person and Government."
- Citation: 35 Geo. 3. c. 3
- Territorial extent: Great Britain

Dates
- Royal assent: 5 February 1795
- Commencement: 5 February 1795
- Expired: 1 July 1795
- Repealed: 21 August 1871
Other legislation
Amends	Habeas Corpus Suspension Act 1794
Repealed by	Statute Law Revision Act 1871

Status: Repealed

Text of statute as originally enacted

On 16 May the committee submitted its first report, saying there was a conspiracy and called for the suspension of habeas corpus for eight months. The bill passed the Commons by 146 votes to 28, after fourteen obstructing divisions by Foxite Whigs. The act was extended to 1 July 1795 by the Habeas Corpus Suspension Act 1795 (35 Geo. 3. c. 3) in a series of debates in January and February 1795. In June 1795 the government lifted the suspension of habeas corpus.

== Subsequent developments ==
The whole act was repealed by section 1 of, and the schedule to, the Statute Law Revision Act 1871 (34 & 35 Vict. c. 116), which came into force on 21 August 1871.

== See also ==
- Habeas Corpus Suspension Act
