= Habeas Corpus Suspension Act 1798 =

Act of the Parliament of Great Britain

- Act of Parliament
- Parliament of Great Britain
- Long title: An act to empower his Majesty to secure and detain such persons as his Majesty shall suspect are conspiring against his person and government.
- Citation: 38 Geo. 3. c. 36
- Territorial extent: Great Britain

Dates
- Royal assent: 21 April 1798
- Commencement: 21 April 1798 (Note: The Acts of Parliament (Commencement) Act 1793.)
- Expired: 1 February 1799 (Note: Section 1.)
- Repealed: 21 August 1871
Other legislation
Amended by	Habeas Corpus Suspension Act 1799; Habeas Corpus Suspension (No. 2) Act 1799; Habeas Corpus Suspension Act 1800; Habeas Corpus Suspension (No. 2) Act 1800
Repealed by	Statute Law Revision Act 1871

Status: Repealed

Text of statute as originally enacted

The Habeas Corpus Suspension Act 1798 (38 Geo. 3. c. 36) was an act of the Parliament of Great Britain.

On 28 February 1798 five members of the leading Jacobin Societies were arrested at Margate while they were trying to travel to France. After interrogating them for evidence, arrests of other Jacobins occurred in Leicester, Manchester and London (where forty-seven members of the London Corresponding Society were arrested between 18 and 20 April). Some of those arrested were released within a few days while others were held for nearly three years. To facilitate these arrests, the suspension of habeas corpus was passed, although only one of the Margate five was convicted. The Act expired on 1 February 1799, although Foxite MPs had wished for 1 November as the expiry date.

== Subsequent developments ==
The whole act was repealed by section 1 of, and the schedule to, the Statute Law Revision Act 1871 (34 & 35 Vict. c. 116), which came into force on 21 August 1871.

== See also ==
- Habeas Corpus Suspension Act
