= Habeas Corpus Suspension Act 1799 =

Act of the Parliament of Great Britain

- Act of Parliament
- Parliament of Great Britain
- Long title: An Act to continue, until the Twenty-first Day of May One thousand seven hundred and ninety nine, an Act made in the last Session of Parliament, intituled, "An Act to empower His Majesty to secure and detain such Persons as His Majesty shall suspect are conspiring against his Person and Government."
- Citation: 39 Geo. 3. c. 15
- Territorial extent: Great Britain

Dates
- Royal assent: 9 January 1799
- Commencement: 9 January 1799 (Note: Section 1.)
- Expired: 21 May 1799
- Repealed: 21 August 1871
Other legislation
Amends	Habeas Corpus Suspension Act 1798
Amended by	Habeas Corpus Suspension Act 1800; Habeas Corpus Suspension (No. 2) Act 1800
Repealed by	Statute Law Revision Act 1871
Relates to	Habeas Corpus Suspension Act 1799

Status: Repealed

Text of statute as originally enacted

Habeas Corpus Suspension (No. 2) Act 1799
- Act of Parliament
- Parliament of Great Britain
- Long title: An Act for further continuing, until the First Day of March One thousand eight hundred, an Act made in the last Session of Parliament, intituled, "An Act to empower His Majesty to secure and detain such Persons as His Majesty shall suspect are conspiring against his Person and Government."
- Citation: 39 Geo. 3. c. 44
- Territorial extent: Great Britain

Dates
- Royal assent: 20 May 1799
- Commencement: 9 January 1799
- Expired: 9 January 1799 (Note: The Acts of Parliament (Commencement) Act 1793.)
- Repealed: 21 August 1871
Other legislation
Amends	Habeas Corpus Suspension Act 1798
Repealed by	Statute Law Revision Act 1871
Relates to	Habeas Corpus Suspension Act 1799

Status: Repealed

Text of statute as originally enacted

The Habeas Corpus Suspension Act 1799 (39 Geo. 3. c. 15) was an act of the Parliament of Great Britain.

Thd act renewed the suspension by the Habeas Corpus Suspension Act 1798 (38 Geo. 3. c. 36) of habeas corpus from 9 January 1799 until 21 May 1799. Habeas corpus was again suspended on 20 May 1799 (39 Geo. 3. c. 44) until 1 March 1800.

This time the act gave new powers to enable the dispersal, among several jails, of prisoners and detainees charged with treason, including Irish prisoners sent to Britain.

== Subsequent developments ==
The whole act was repealed by section 1 of, and the schedule to, the Statute Law Revision Act 1871 (34 & 35 Vict. c. 116), which came into force on 21 August 1871.

== See also ==
- Habeas Corpus Suspension Act
