= Continuance of Laws (No. 2) Act 1800 =

Act of the Parliament of Great Britain

- Act of Parliament
- Parliament of Great Britain
- Long title: An Act for continuing, until the Expiration of Forty Days after the Commencement of the first Session of Parliament that shall be begun and holden after the first Day of September one thousand eight hundred and one, several Laws relating to the prohibiting the Exportation, and permitting the Importation, of Corn and other Articles of Provision without Payment of Duty; to the allowing the Use of Sugar in the brewing of Beer; to the reducing the Duties upon Spirits distilled from Melasses and Sugar; and to the prohibiting the making of Low Wines or Spirits from Wheat and certain other Articles in that Part of Great Britain called Scotland.
- Citation: 41 Geo. 3. (G.B.) c. 5
- Territorial extent: Great Britain

Dates
- Royal assent: 8 December 1800
- Commencement: 8 December 1800 (Note: The Acts of Parliament (Commencement) Act 1793.)
- Repealed: 21 August 1871
Other legislation
Amends	See § Continued enactments
Repealed by	Statute Law Revision Act 1871
Relates to	See Expiring laws continuance legislation

Status: Repealed

Text of statute as originally enacted

The Continuance of Laws (No. 2) Act 1800 (41 Geo. 3. (G.B.) c. 5) was an act of the Parliament of Great Britain that continued various older acts.

== Background ==
In the United Kingdom, acts of Parliament remain in force until expressly repealed. Many acts of parliament, however, contained time-limited sunset clauses, requiring legislation to revive enactments that had expired or to continue enactments that would otherwise expire.

== Provisions ==
=== Continued enactments ===
Section 1 of the act continued the Importation (No. 3) Act 1799 (39 Geo. 3. c. 87), as continued by the Continuance of Laws Act 1799 (39 & 40 Geo. 3. c. 9) and as amended and continued by the Importation and Exportation Act 1800 (c. 58), the Use of Sugar in Brewing Act 1800 (c. 62), the Duties on Spirits Act 1799 (c. 8), the Duties on Wash Made from Sugar Act 1800 (c. 61) "so far as relates to the Duties on Wort or Wash brewed or made from Melasses or Sugar" and the Distillation from Wheat, etc. Act 1799 (c. 7), as continued by the Distillation From Wheat, etc. Act 1800 (c. 21), until 40 days after the start of the first session of parliament after 1 September 1801.

== Subsequent developments ==
The whole act was repealed by section 1 of, and the schedule to, the Statute Law Revision Act 1871 (34 & 35 Vict. c. 116), which came into force on 21 August 1871.
