= Penitentiary Act 1779 =

Act of the Parliament of Great Britain

- Act of Parliament
- Parliament of Great Britain
- Long title: An Act to explain and amend the Laws relating to the Transportation, Imprisonment and other Punishment of certain Offenders.
- Citation: 19 Geo. 3. c. 74
- Territorial extent: England and Wales (Note: Section 1.)

Dates
- Royal assent: 30 June 1779
- Commencement: 1 July 1779 (Note: Section 1.)
- Repealed: 21 August 1871
Other legislation
Amended by	Transportation, etc. Act 1784; Continuance of Laws (No. 2) Act 1788; Punishment of Burning in the Hand Act 1799; Criminal Statute Law Repeal Act 1827; Criminal Law (India) Act 1828
Repealed by	Statute Law Revision Act 1871

Status: Repealed

Text of statute as originally enacted

The Penitentiary Act 1779 (19 Geo. 3. c. 74) was an act of the Parliament of Great Britain passed in 1779 which introduced a policy of state prisons for the first time. The act was drafted by the prison reformer John Howard and the jurist William Blackstone and recommended imprisonment as an alternative sentence to death or transportation.

The prison population in England and Wales had swollen following the initial fighting in the American Rebellion and the government's attendant decision, by the Criminal Law Act 1776 (16 Geo. 3. c. 43), to temporarily halt use of the American Colonies as the standard destination for transported criminals. As early as 1777, Howard had produced a report to a House of Commons select committee which identified appalling conditions in most of the prisons he had inspected.

While the purpose of the act had been to create a network of state-operated prisons, and despite its passage through Parliament, the act resulted only in considerable study of methods, alternatives and possible locations; no prisons would be built as a direct result of the act, although the prison network and alternatives would be created over time.

Jeremy Bentham in his panopticon footnotes that:

"In showing that absolute solitude is not an essential part, nor indeed any part of the penitentiary system, I had forgot the original Penitentiary Act, 19 Geo. III. c. 74; solitude extends neither to 'labour,' not 'devotion,' not 'meal,' nor 'airing.'"

Bentham denoted that differences of law are to different corresponding sets of powers and duties; in his Panoptican he wrote this part and referred again to this act:

"To join interest with duty, and that by the strongest cement that can be found, is the object to which they point. To join interest with duty, is the object avowed to be aimed at by the act. The emolument of the governor is to be proportioned in a certain way to the success of the management. Why? that it may be 'his interest' to make a successful business of it, 'as well as his duty.' (Note: 19 Geo. III. ch. 74. § 18.)"

This plan was adopted by Jeremy Bentham as particular to prisons, poorhouses, lazarettos, houses of industry, manufactories, hospitals, workhouses, madhouses, and schools. A series of letters written in the year 1787, from Crecheff in White Russia to a friend in England, is also elaborate to the Liberal ground of that time. His Pathoscopic (sensitive-faculty-regarding) Pneumatology (spirit-regarding or mind-regarding) is divided into Ergastic (work-producing) and Anergastic (no-work-producing), which this branch is regarded in Ethics.

== Subsequent developments ==
The act was continued from the expiration of the act until the end of the next session of parliament after 1 June 1793 by section 2 of the Continuance of Laws (No. 2) Act 1788 (28 Geo. 3. c. 24).

So much of the act "as relates to the Punishment of burning in the Hand of certain Persons convicted of Felony with the Benefit of Clergy" was made perpetual by section 1 of the Punishment of Burning in the Hand Act 1799 (39 Geo. 3. c. 45).

The whole act was repealed by section 1 of, and the schedule to, the Statute Law Revision Act 1871 (34 & 35 Vict. c. 116), which came into force on 21 August 1871.
