= Punishment of Burning in the Hand Act 1799 =

Act of the Parliament of Great Britain

- Act of Parliament
- Parliament of Great Britain
- Long title: An Act for making perpetual so much of an Act made in the nineteenth Year of the Reign of His present Majesty, Chapter Seventy-four, videlicet, on the twenty-sixth Day of November on thousand seven hundred and seventy-eight, intituled, "An Act to explain and amend the Laws relating to the Transportation, Imprisonment, and other Punishment of certain Offenders," as relates to the Punishment of burning in the Hand of certain Persons convicted of Felony with the Benefit of Clergy.
- Citation: 39 Geo. 3. c. 45
- Territorial extent: Great Britain

Dates
- Royal assent: 20 May 1799
- Commencement: 20 May 1799 (Note: The Acts of Parliament (Commencement) Act 1793.)
- Repealed: 6 August 1861
Other legislation
Amends	Transportation, etc. Act 1779
Repealed by	Statute Law Revision Act 1861
Relates to	Transportation, etc. Act 1784; Continuance of Laws (No. 2) Act 1788

Status: Repealed

Text of statute as originally enacted

The Punishment of Burning in the Hand Act 1799 (39 Geo. 3. c. 45) was an act of the Parliament of Great Britain. It continued and made perpetual an act from 20 years earlier, the Transportation, etc. Act 1779 (19 Geo. 3. c. 74), that provided for such punishment for felons who were convicted within benefit of clergy.

== Subsequent developments ==
The whole act was repealed by section 1 of, and the schedule to, the Statute Law Revision Act 1861 (24 & 25 Vict. c. 101), which came into force on 6 August 1861.
