= Land Tax Redemption Act 1802 =

Act of the Parliament of the United Kingdom

Land Tax Redemption Act 1802 (Note: The citation of this act by this short title was authorised by section 1 of, and the first schedule to, the Short Titles Act 1896. Due to the repeal of those provisions it is now authorised by section 19(2) of the Interpretation Act 1978.)
- Act of Parliament
- Parliament of the United Kingdom
- Long title: An Act for consolidating the Provisions of the several Acts passed for the Redemption and Sale of the Land Tax, into One Act, and for making further Provision for the Redemption and Sale thereof; and for removing Doubts respecting the Right of Persons claiming to vote at Elections for Knights of the Shire and other Members to serve in Parliament, in respect of Messuages, Lands, or Tenements, the Land Tax upon which shall have been redeemed or purchased.
- Citation: 42 Geo. 3. c. 116
- Territorial extent: United Kingdom

Dates
- Royal assent: 26 June 1802
- Commencement: 26 June 1802 (Note: The Acts of Parliament (Commencement) Act 1793.)
- Repealed: 16 November 1989
Other legislation
Amends	Land Tax Perpetuation Act 1798
Repeals/revokes	See § Repealed enactments
Amended by	False Oaths (Scotland) Act 1933; Charities Act 1960; Crown Estate Act 1961
Repealed by	Statute Law (Repeals) Act 1989
Relates to	Land Tax Act 1797

Status: Repealed

Text of statute as originally enacted

The Land Tax Redemption Act 1802 (42 Geo. 3. c. 116) was an act of the Parliament of the United Kingdom that consolidated enactments relating to the redemption and sale of the land tax in Great Britain.

The land tax had been made perpetual, subject to redemption and purchase, by the Land Tax Perpetuation Act 1798 (38 Geo. 3. c. 60), which allowed landowners to redeem the tax charged on their property by paying a capital sum. That act, and several further acts passed between 1798 and 1801 amending and extending its machinery for redemption and purchase, were consolidated and re-enacted by the 1802 act into a single measure.

== Provisions ==
=== Repealed enactments ===
Section 1 of the act repealed 8 enactments, listed in that section, and also provided that the provisions of the Land Tax Perpetuation Act 1798 (38 Geo. 3. c. 60) should cease and determine from 24 June 1802, save for such parts of it as made perpetual, subject to redemption and purchase, the sums charged in Great Britain as a land tax for the year from 25 March 1798. The repeal did not affect commissions already granted, or appointments already made, under the recited acts, or acts, proceedings, matters and things already done under them; every contract for the redemption or purchase of land tax entered into after 24 June 1802 was required to be made according to the provisions of this act.

Citation	Short title	Description	Extent of repeal
39 Geo. 3. c. 6	Land Tax Redemption, etc. Act 1798	An Act to enlarge the Time limited for the Redemption of the Land Tax, and to explain and amend an Act, made in the last Session of Parliament, intituled, An Act for making perpetual, subject to Redemption and Purchase in the Manner therein stated, the several Sums of Money now charged in Great Britain as a Land Tax for One Year from the Twenty-fifth Day of March One thousand seven hundred and ninety-eight.	The whole act.
39 Geo. 3. c. 21	Land Tax Redemption Act 1799	An Act to amend and render more effectual Two Acts, passed in the Thirty-eighth Year of His present Majesty's Reign and the present Session of Parliament, for the Redemption and Purchase of the Land Tax.	The whole act.
39 Geo. 3. c. 40	Land Tax Redemption (No. 2) Act 1799	An Act to amend so much of Three Acts, made in the last and present Session of Parliament, for making perpetual, subject to Redemption and Purchase, the several Sums of Money charged as a Land Tax, as relates to that Part of Great Britain called Scotland.	The whole act.
39 Geo. 3. c. 43	Land Tax Redemption (No. 3) Act 1799	An Act for enlarging the Time limited by certain Acts, passed for the Redemption of the Land Tax, for receiving Contracts, and making Transfers of Stock thereon, and for explaining and amending the said Acts.	The whole act.
39 Geo. 3. c. 108	Land Tax Redemption (No. 4) Act 1799	An Act to amend and render effectual several Acts for the Redemption and Purchase of the Land Tax.	The whole act.
39 & 40 Geo. 3. c. 30	Land Tax Redemption Act 1800	An Act for extending, from the Twenty-fifth Day of March One thousand eight hundred, until the Twenty-fifth Day of March One thousand eight hundred and one, the Period of Preference granted and continued by several Acts to Bodies Corporate and Persons for the Redemption of Land Tax, and for enlarging the Powers contained in the said Acts.	The whole act.
41 Geo. 3. (G.B.) c. 28	Land Tax Redemption (No. 2) Act 1800	An Act to explain, amend, and render more effectual, the several Acts made in the Thirty-eighth and Thirty-ninth Years of the Reign of His present Majesty, and in the last Session of Parliament, for the Redemption and Purchase of the Land Tax.	The whole act.
41 Geo. 3. (U.K.) c. 72	Land Tax Redemption Act 1801	An Act for extending the Period of Preference granted and continued by several Acts to Bodies Corporate and Persons for the Redemption of the Land Tax, and to amend an Act of the Thirty-eighth Year of the Reign of His present Majesty, for granting an Aid to His Majesty by a Land Tax.	The whole act.

== Subsequent developments ==
Most of the act was repealed by section 73(8) of, and part V of schedule 14 to, the Finance Act 1963, which came into force on 31 July 1963, as part of the abolition of the land tax.

The whole act was repealed by section 1(1) of, and part II of schedule 1 to, the Statute Law (Repeals) Act 1989, which came into force on 16 November 1989.
