= Importation and Exportation (No. 2) Act 1791 =

Act of the Parliament of Great Britain

- Act of Parliament
- Parliament of Great Britain
- Long title: An Act for regulating the Importation and Exportation of Corn, and the Payment of the Duty on Foreign Corn imported, and of the Bounty on British Corn exported.
- Citation: 31 Geo. 3. c. 30
- Territorial extent: Great Britain

Dates
- Royal assent: 10 June 1791
- Commencement: 15 November 1791 (Note: Section 3.)
- Repealed: 10 July 1821
Other legislation
Amends	See § Repealed enactments
Repeals/revokes	See § Repealed enactments
Amended by	Importation and Exportation (No. 2) Act 1793
Repealed by	Importation and Exportation Act 1821
Relates to	Importation (No. 4) Act 1795; Continuance of Laws (No. 2) Act 1799

Status: Repealed

Text of statute as originally enacted

The Importation and Exportation (No. 2) Act 1791 (31 Geo. 3. c. 30) was an act of the Parliament of Great Britain that consolidated acts relating to the importation and exportation of corn and amended the payment of duties on imported corn and the bounty on exported corn.

== Background ==
As a staple of life, as well as an important commodity of trade, corn and its traffic was long the subject of debate and of government regulation – the Tudors legislating against speculating in corn, and the Stuarts introducing import and export controls. Import had been regulated as early as 1670; and in 1689 traders were provided bounties for exporting rye, malt and wheat (all classified as corn at the time, the same commodities being taxed when imported into England). In 1773, the Corn Act 1772 (13 Geo. 3. c. 43), "An act to regulate the importation and exportation of corn" repealed Elizabethan controls on grain speculation; but also shut off exports and allowed imports when the price was above 48 shillings (Note: About £317 today) per quarter (Note: A 'quarter' was a unit of volume rather than of weight but a 'quarter of wheat' weighed about 224 kg (494 lb). (The density of wheat is 0.770, and a quarter by volume (64 gallons) equates to 291 litres, multiplied by 0.770 gives 224 kg).) (thus compromising to allow for interests of producers and consumers alike).

By the 1790s, the issue remained one of public debate (by figures such as Edmund Burke), and parliament desired to make changes to favour agricultural producers.

== Provisions ==
=== Repealed enactments ===
Section 1 of the act repealed 7 enactments, listed in that section, taking effect on the commencement of the act. Section 1 of the act also repealed "all and every provision in any other act contained for regulating the importation from foreign parts, of wheat, rye, barley, peas, beans, oats, beer or bigg, Indian corn or maise, whether ground or unground, and of malt, bread, or biscuit, made of any of the said sorts of corn, and for the payment of the duty thereon, and also all and every provision in any other act contained, for regulating the exportation of any of the said sorts of corn or other articles as aforesaid, and for payment of the bounty thereon, except so far as the malt for exportation, or to the exportation thereof".

Section 2 of the act also repealed so much of the "as prohibits the buying of corn to sell again, and the laying it up in granaries, when the several sorts of corn are above certain prices therein mentioned".

Citation	Short title	Title	Extent of repeal
15 Car. 2. c. 7	Encouragement of Trade Act 1663	An act, passed in the fifteenth year of the reign of his late majesty King Charles the Second, intituled, An act for the encouragement of trade.	The whole act.
1 Jac. 2. c. 19	Tillage Act 1685	An act, passed in the first year of the reign of his majesty King James the Second, intituled, An additional act for the improvement of tillage.	The whole act.
1 Gul. et Mar. c. 12	Exportation (Corn) Act 1688	An act, passed in the first year of the reign of their late majesties King William and Queen Mary, intituled, An act for the encouraging the exportation of corn.	The whole act.
5 Geo. 2. c. 12	Corn Act 1731	An act, passed in the fifth year of the reign of his late majesty King George the Second, intituled, An act for amending and making more effectual an act, made in the first year of the reign of King James the Second, intituled, "An additional act for the improvement of tillage.	The whole act.
10 Geo. 3. c. 39	Corn Act 1770	An act, passed in the tenth year of the reign of his present Majesty, intituled, An act for registering the prices at which corn is fold in the several counties of Great Britain, and the quantity exported and imported.	The whole act.
13 Geo. 3. c. 43	Corn Act 1772	An act, passed in the thirteenth year of the reign of his present Majesty, intituled, An act to regulate the importation and exportation of corn.	The whole act.
21 Geo. 3. c. 50	Corn Act 1781	An act, passed in the twenty-first year of the reign of his present Majesty, intituled, An act for further regulating and ascertaining the importation and exportation of corn and grain, within several ports and places therein mentioned.	The whole act.
29 Geo. 3	Importation and Exportation Act 1789	An act, passed in the twenty-ninth year of the reign of his present Majesty, intituled, An act for better regulating and ascertaining the importation and exportation of corn and grain; and also for better regulating the exportation of starch, and the importation of rape seed.	The whole act.

== Subsequent development ==
The act was amended by the Importation and Exportation (No. 2) Act 1793 (33 Geo. 3. c. 65).

The Select Committee on Temporary Laws described this act as a Consolidation Act. Section 2 of the Continuance of Laws (No. 2) Act 1799 (39 Geo. 3. c. 38) provided that from 1 June 1799, the average price of middling British rape seed at the places of importation would be ascertained in the same manner as provided by the act.

In 1804, the Importation and Exportation Act 1804 (44 Geo. 3. c. 109) amended the act, further agricultural producers.

The whole act was repealed by section 1 of the Importation and Exportation Act 1821 (1 & 2 Geo. 4. c. 87). This formed part of the Corn Laws, tariffs and other trade restrictions on imported food and corn enforced in the United Kingdom between 1815 and 1846.

== See also ==
- Corn Laws
