= Duties on Servants, etc. Act 1802 =

Act of the Parliament of the United Kingdom

- Act of Parliament
- Parliament of the United Kingdom
- Long title: An Act for granting to His Majesty certain additional Duties on Servants, Carriages, Horses, Mules, and Dogs; and for consolidating the same with the present Duties thereon.
- Citation: 42 Geo. 3. c. 37
- Territorial extent: England and Wales; Scotland; (Note: Section 1.)

Dates
- Royal assent: 30 April 1802
- Commencement: 5 April 1802 (England); 15 May 1802 (Scotland, the term of Whitsunday)
- Repealed: 6 August 1861

Other legislation
- Repealed by: Statute Law Revision Act 1861

Status: Repealed

Text of statute as originally enacted

The Duties on Servants, etc. Act 1802 (42 Geo. 3. c. 37) was an act of the Parliament of the United Kingdom that granted additional duties on menservants, carriages, horses, mules and dogs kept in Great Britain, and consolidated the collection of those duties with the duties already charged on the same articles.

== Subsequent developments ==
The whole act was repealed by section 1 of, and the schedule to, the Statute Law Revision Act 1861 (24 & 25 Vict. c. 101), which came into force on 6 August 1861.
