= Statute Law Revision Act 1861 =

Act of the Parliament of the United Kingdom

Statute Law Revision Act 1861 (Note: Section 2.)
- Act of Parliament
- Parliament of the United Kingdom
- Long title: An Act for promoting the Revision of the Statute Law by repealing divers Acts and Parts of Acts which have ceased to be in force.
- Citation: 24 & 25 Vict. c. 101
- Introduced by: John Campbell, 1st Baron Campbell (Lords)
- Territorial extent: United Kingdom

Dates
- Royal assent: 6 August 1861
- Commencement: 6 August 1861 (Note: The Acts of Parliament (Commencement) Act 1793.)
- Repealed: 19 November 1998
Other legislation
Amends	See § Repealed enactments
Repeals/revokes	See § Repealed enactments
Repealed by	Statute Law (Repeals) Act 1998
Relates to	Repeal of Obsolete Statutes Act 1856; Criminal Statutes Repeal Act 1861; See Statute Law Revision Act

Status: Repealed

History of passage through Parliament

Records of Parliamentary debate relating to the statute from Hansard

Text of statute as originally enacted

The Statute Law Revision Act 1861 (24 & 25 Vict. c. 101) was an act of the Parliament of the United Kingdom. The act was the first of the series of Statute Law Revision Acts, although some consider the Repeal of Obsolete Statutes Act 1856 (19 & 20 Vict. c. 64) to be the first.

The act was intended, in particular, to facilitate the preparation of a revised edition of the statutes. It repealed the whole or portions of 884 acts, passed between 1771 (11 Geo. 3) and 1853 (16 & 17 Vict.). (Note: The first act in the schedule is the Militia Act 1771 (11 Geo. 3. c. 32), passed on 29 April 1771. The final act in the schedule is the Metropolitan Sewers Acts Continuance Act 1853 (16 & 17 Vict. c. 125), passed on 20 August 1853.)

== Background ==
In the United Kingdom, acts of Parliament remain in force until expressly repealed. Blackstone's Commentaries on the Laws of England, published in the late 18th century, raised questions about the system and structure of the common law and the poor drafting and disorder of the existing statute book.

From 1810 to 1825, The Statutes of the Realm was published, providing the first authoritative collection of acts. The first statute law revision act was not passed until 1856 with the Repeal of Obsolete Statutes Act 1856 (19 & 20 Vict. c. 64). This approach – focusing on removing obsolete laws from the statute book followed by consolidation – was proposed by the Whig MP Peter Locke King, who had been highly critical of previous commissions' approaches, expenditures, and lack of results.

=== Drafting ===
On 17 February 1860, the Attorney General, Sir Richard Bethell, told the House of Commons that he had engaged Sir Francis Reilly and A. J. Wood to expurgate the statute book of all acts which, though not expressly repealed, were not in force, working backwards from the present time.

== Passage ==
The Statute Law Revision Bill had its first reading in the House of Lords on 24 August 1860, introduced by the Lord Chancellor, Robert Rolfe, 1st Baron Cranworth. The bill did not progress in that parliamentary session.

The re-introduced Statute Law Revision Bill had had its first reading in the House of Lords on 11 February 1861, introduced by the Lord Chancellor, Robert Rolfe, 1st Baron Cranworth. In his speech introducing the bill, the Lord Cranworth explained that the bill aimed to repeal outdated laws to simplify and consolidate the legal code, allowing for a more manageable and up-to-date statute book by cutting it down to one-fourth of its original size.

The bill had its second reading in the House of Lords on 28 February 1861 and was committed to a committee of the whole house, which met and reported without amendment on 7 March 1861. The bill was criticised by the former Lord Chancellor, Frederic Thesiger, 1st Baron Chelmsford, who voiced concerns about the process, particularly regarding the heavy reliance on two legal experts without further scrutiny by the House and by Richard Hely-Hutchinson, 4th Earl of Donoughmore, who suggested the bill ought to be referred to a select committee. The bill had its third reading in the House of Lords on 8 March 1861, with amendments.

The bill had its first reading in the House of Commons on 11 March 1861, its second reading in the House of Commons on 15 April 1861, and was and committed to a select committee. The select committee was discharged and the bill was committed to a committee of the whole house on 26 July 1861, which met and reported on 30 July 1861, with amendments. The amended bill had its third reading in the House of Commons on 31 July 1861. The amended bill was considered and agreed to by the House of Lords on 2 August 1861.

The bill was granted royal assent on 6 August 1861.

== Subsequent developments ==
The whole act was repealed for the United Kingdom by section 1(1) of, and group 1 of part IX of schedule 1 to the Statute Law (Repeals) Act 1998, which came into force on 19 November 1998.

The enactments which were repealed (whether for the whole or any part of the United Kingdom) by the act were repealed so far as they extended to the Isle of Man by section 1(1) of, and schedule 1 to, the Statute Law Revision (Isle of Man) Act 1991, which came into force on 25 July 1991.

The act was retained for the Republic of Ireland by section 2(2)(a) of, and part 4 of schedule 1 to, the Statute Law Revision Act 2007, which came into force on 8 May 2007.

== Repealed enactments ==
Section 1 of the act repealed or amended 884 enactments, listed in the schedule to the act, across six categories: (Note: The Note of the bill, unlike the schedule, gives commentary on each act, noting any earlier repeals and the reason for the new repeal.)

- Expired
- Spent
- Repealed in general terms
- Virtually repealed
- Superseded
- Obsolete

Section 1 includes the original version of the Westbury saving to ensure that the repeal does not negatively affect existing rights or ongoing legal matters.

Citation	Short title	Subject	Extent of repeal
11 Geo. 3. c. 32	Militia Act 1771	Militia Pay	The whole act.
11 Geo. 3. c. 38	Greenland and Whale Fishery Act 1771	Greenland and Whale Fishery	The whole act.
11 Geo. 3. c. 55	Parliamentary Elections, New Shoreham Act 1771	Borough of New Shoreham Parliamentary Elections	So much of Section 5. as relates to the Time for the proper Officer proceeding to Election.
12 Geo. 3. c. 29	Spurn Point Lighthouse Act 1772	Spurn Point Lighthouses	The whole act.
12 Geo. 3. c. 30	Salaries of Justices of Chester, etc. Act 1772	Salaries of Justices of Chester and Great Sessions in Wales	The whole act.
12 Geo. 3. c. 46	Excise Act 1772	Prevention of Frauds in Excise Revenue, Tea, Soap, Low Wines and Spirits	So much as relates to the Manufacture of Low Wines and Spirits, and to Treble Costs.
12 Geo. 3. c. 54	Timber for the Navy Act 1772	Oak Timber for Navy, Restraint on East India Company	The whole act.
12 Geo. 3. c. 55	Trade Act 1772	Trade between Great Britain and Ireland	The whole act.
12 Geo. 3. c. 58	Herring Fisher Act 1772	Encouragement of Herring Fishery, Isle of Man	The whole act.
12 Geo. 3. c. 60	Customs (No. 2) Act 1772	Drawback on Tea exported, &c.	The whole act.
12 Geo. 3. c. 67	Marine Society Act 1772	Incorporation of the Marine Society	So much as relates to Stamp Duty, to Limitation of Actions for anything done in pursuance of the Act, to pleading of General Issue, and to Double Costs.
13 Geo. 3. c. 23	Militia Pay Act 1772	Militia Pay	The whole act.
13 Geo. 3. c. 33	Preservation of Timber Act 1772	Preservation of Timber Trees	The whole act.
13 Geo. 3. c. 44	Customs Act 1772	Drawback of Customs Duty on Exportation of Tea to America, &c.	The whole act.
13 Geo. 3. c. 51	Frivolous Suits Act 1772	Discouragement of frivolous and vexatious Suits in the Courts at Westminster for Cause of Action arising in Wales	The whole act.
13 Geo. 3. c. 56	Sale of Spirits, etc. Act 1772	Retailing of Spirits, and Duties on Printed Calicoes, &c.	Section 5.
13 Geo. 3. c. 58	Gaols Act 1772	Providing of Clergymen for Gaols	The whole act.
13 Geo. 3. c. 62	Bread Act 1772	Regulation of the Assize and making of Bread	The whole act.
13 Geo. 3. c. 67	Importation (No. 4) Act 1772	Importation of printed or painted Paper	The whole act.
13 Geo. 3. c. 72	Importation and Exportation (No. 8) Act 1772	Free Importation of Cod, &c. caught in the Gulf of St. Lawrence or on the Coast of Labrador	The whole act.
13 Geo. 3. c. 73	Importation and Exportation (No. 9) Act 1772	Importation and Exportation, Dominica and Jamaica	The whole act.
13 Geo. 3. c. 74	Tonnage, etc., of Ships, etc. Act 1772	Tonnage of Vessels and Customs Duties	The whole act.
13 Geo. 3. c. 80	Game Act 1773	Preservation of Game	The whole act.
13 Geo. 3. c. 81	Inclosure Act 1773	Improvement of Commons	So much as relates to Double Costs.
13 Geo. 3. c. 82	Lying-in Hospitals Act 1773	Regulation of Lying-in Hospitals, and Settlement of Bastard Children born in them	So much as relates to Treble Costs.
14 Geo. 3. c. 10	Exportation (No. 2) Act 1774	Exportation of Gum Seneca	The whole act.
14 Geo. 3. c. 64	Corn Act 1774	Ascertaining of the Prices of Corn	The whole act.
14 Geo. 3. c. 65	Forfeited Estates (Scotland) Act 1774	Forfeited Estates (Scotland) Management	The whole act.
14 Geo. 3. c. 70	Coin Act 1774	Gold Recoinage	The whole, except s. 7.
14 Geo. 3. c. 72	Duty on Cotton Stuffs, etc. Act 1774	Duty on printed, &c. Stuffs manufactured in Great Britain	The whole, except s. 2.
14 Geo. 3. c. 73	Distillation, etc. Act 1774	Distillation of Spirits, and Allowance to certain Manufacturers of the Duties on Soap	The whole act.
14 Geo. 3. c. 74	Importation (No. 2) Act 1774	Reduction of Duties upon Importation of Great Raisins	The whole act.
14 Geo. 3. c. 78	Fires Prevention (Metropolis) Act 1774	Metropolitan Buildings Regulation, and Prevention of Mischiefs by Fire	So much as relates to Time for Notice of Actions for anything done in pursuance of the Act, and to Treble Costs.
14 Geo. 3. c. 79	Legal Rate of Interest Act 1774	Removal of Doubts concerning the Validity of Mortgages, &c. executed in Great Britain of Land, &c. in Ireland and the Colonies	The whole act.
14 Geo. 3. c. 81	Parliamentary Elections (No. 3) Act 1774	Election of Members of Parliament (Scotland)	The whole act.
14 Geo. 3. c. 92	Weights for Coin in the Mint Act 1774	Regulation of Weights used in weighing Gold and Silver Coin	So much as relates to Salary of Officer to be paid by Warden of Mint.
15 Geo. 3. c. 1	Importation Act 1775	Importation of Indian Corn and Maize	The whole act.
15 Geo. 3. c. 10	Trade Act 1775	Restraint of Commerce of Provinces of Massachuset's Bay, &c., and Colonies of Connecticut, &c.	The whole act.
15 Geo. 3. c. 18	Trade (No. 2) Act 1775	Restraint of Commerce of Colonies of New Jersey, &c.	The whole act.
15 Geo. 3. c. 27	Measurement of Coal Wagons, etc. Act 1775	Admeasurement of Waggons, &c. used for loading Coals on board Ships	So much as relates to Treble Costs.
15 Geo. 3. c. 34	Customs Act 1775	Encouragement of Manufacture of Rape Oil	The whole act.
15 Geo. 3. c. 36	Parliament Act 1775	Issue of Speaker's Warrants for Writs for Election of Members in the Place of Members dying or becoming Peers during the Recess	The whole act.
15 Geo. 3. c. 37	Customs (No. 3) Act 1775	Importation of painted Earthenware	The whole act.
15 Geo. 3. c. 53	Copyright Act 1775	Copyright in Books given to the Universities, &c.	Section 6. and so much as relates to Plea of General Issue.
16 Geo. 3. c. 5	Prohibitory Act 1776	Prohibition of Trade and Intercourse with Colonies of New Hampshire, &c.	The whole act.
16 Geo. 3. c. 8	Importation Act 1776	Importation of salted Beef, &c. from Ireland	The whole act.
16 Geo. 3. c. 37	Exportation Act 1776	Exportation of Wheat, &c. to certain Colonies in America, &c.	The whole act.
16 Geo. 3. c. 42	Customs Act (No. 2) 1776	Landing of Corn, &c. imported into Port of Preston	The whole act.
17 Geo. 3. c. 7	Privateers Act 1776	Granting of Commissions to Privateers to make Prize of Ships, &c.	The whole act.
17 Geo. 3. c. 8	East India Company Act 1776	East India Company, Election of Directors	The whole act.
17 Geo. 3. c. 11	Worsted Act 1776	Prevention of Frauds and Abuses by Wool Combers, &c. in Yorkshire, Lancashire, and Cheshire	Sections 17, 18, 19, and so much as relates to Limitation of Actions for anything done in pursuance of the Act, as to pleading of General Issue, and as to Treble Costs.
17 Geo. 3. c. 26	Grants of Life Annuities Act 1776	Registering of Grants of Life Annuities	The whole act.
17 Geo. 3. c. 27	Customs (No. 4) Act 1776	Allowance of Drawback of Duties of Customs on Exportation of Tea to Ireland	The whole act.
17 Geo. 3. c. 33	Dyers Act 1776	Power to Master Dyers in Middlesex, Essex, Surrey, and Kent to employ Journeymen who have not served Apprenticeships	The whole act.
17 Geo. 3. c. 39	Taxation (No. 2) Act 1776	Duties on Servants and on Glass, and on Persons having certain Quantities of Silver Plate	The whole act.
17 Geo. 3. c. 40	Captures Act 1776	Carrying of certain Captures into His Majesty's Dominions in North America	The whole act.
17 Geo. 3. c. 50	Auctioneers' Licences Act 1776	Duties on Auctioneers Licences, Sales by Auction, and Instruments	The whole, except s. 24.
17 Geo. 3. c. 56	Frauds by Workmen Act 1777	Prevention of Frauds by Persons employed in the Manufacture of Hats, &c.	Section 18. and so much as relates to Treble Costs.
17 Geo. 3. c. 57	Prints Copyright Act 1777	Copyright of Engravings	So much as relates to Double Costs.
18 Geo. 3. c. 14	Militia Act 1778	Militia Pay and Supply of Vacancies in Militia	The whole act.
18 Geo. 3. c. 16	Exportation Act 1778	Exportation of Wheat Flour, &c. to Newfoundland, &c.	The whole act.
18 Geo. 3. c. 18	Forgery Act 1778	Forgery of Acceptances of Bills, &c. with Intent to defraud Corporations	The whole act.
18 Geo. 3. c. 24	Customs Act 1778	Importation of Tobacco	The whole act.
18 Geo. 3. c. 25	Customs (No. 2) Act 1778	Importation of Corn into certain Ports	The whole act.
18 Geo. 3. c. 40	Customs (No. 4) Act 1778	Customs	The whole act.
18 Geo. 3. c. 55	Exportation, etc. Act 1778	Exportation from Ireland to America, and Encouragement of the Fisheries, &c. of Ireland	The whole act.
18 Geo. 3. c. 56	Importation Act 1778	Importation of Cotton Yarn the Manufacture of Ireland Duty-free	The whole act.
18 Geo. 3. c. 59	Militia, etc. Act 1778	Militia and Fencibles	The whole act.
19 Geo. 3. c. 21	Lottery Office Keepers Act 1779	Licensing and regulating of Lottery Office Keepers	The whole act.
19 Geo. 3. c. 25	Taxation Act 1779	Additional Duties upon the Produce of Customs and Excise Duties	The whole act.
19 Geo. 3. c. 29	Customs (No. 2) Act 1779	Landing of Corn, &c. in the Isle of Wight without Payment of Duties	The whole act.
19 Geo. 3. c. 40	Duties on Starch Act 1779	Duties on Starch	The whole act.
19 Geo. 3. c. 41	Customs (No. 3) Act 1779	Drawback of Wine Duties on Exportation to certain Parts	The whole act.
19 Geo. 3. c. 48	Shipping and Navigation Act 1779	Encouragement of Shipping and Navigation	The whole act.
19 Geo. 3. c. 50	Distillers Act 1779	Prevention of Frauds by private Distillers	The whole act.
19 Geo. 3. c. 51	Taxation (No. 2) Act 1779	Duties on Horses, &c.	The whole act.
19 Geo. 3. c. 52	Taxation (No. 3) Act 1779	Duty on Pilchards	The whole act.
19 Geo. 3. c. 53	Taxation (No. 4) Act 1779	Duties on Exportation of certain Cotton Wool, Discontinuance	The whole act.
19 Geo. 3. c. 56	Auction Duties, etc. Act 1779	Duties on Auctioneers Licences and on Sales by Auction	The whole act.
19 Geo. 3. c. 65	Salaries of Judges Act 1779	Augmentation of the Salaries of the Puisne Justices of the King's Bench and Common Pleas, and Barons of the Exchequer at Westminster	The whole act.
19 Geo. 3. c. 66	Stamp Duties Act 1779	Stamp Duties	The whole act.
19 Geo. 3. c. 69	Smuggling, etc. Act 1779	Prevention of Smuggling, &c.	The whole act.
19 Geo. 3. c. 72	Militia, etc. Act 1779	Militia and Fencibles	The whole act.
19 Geo. 3. c. 76	Militia Act 1779	Augmentation of the Militia	The whole act.
20 Geo. 3. c. 8	Militia Act 1780	Militia—Delivery of Certificates of Qualification to Clerks of the Peace	The whole act.
20 Geo. 3. c. 30	Customs (No. 3) Act 1780	Additional Duties upon Wines and Vinegar imported	The whole act.
20 Geo. 3. c. 34	Salt Duties Act 1780	Additional Duties on Salt	The whole act.
20 Geo. 3. c. 35	Duties on Malt, etc. Act 1780	Additional Duties on Malt and upon Spirits, &c.	The whole act.
20 Geo. 3. c. 44	Militia (No. 2) Act 1780	Militia	The whole act.
20 Geo. 3. c. 51	Taxation Act 1780	Duties on Licences to let Horses for Hire	The whole act.
20 Geo. 3. c. 52	Taxation (No. 2) Act 1780	Additional Duties on Starch and Hair Powder imported, and on Starch and Sweets made in Great Britain	The whole act.
20 Geo. 3. c. 60	Fisheries Act 1780	Fisheries in the Greenland Seas and Davis's Straits	The whole act.
21 Geo. 3. c. 7	Militia Act 1781	Augmentation of the Militia	The whole act.
21 Geo. 3. c. 17	Excise Duties Act 1781	Additional Duty on the Produce of the Excise Duties	The whole act.
21 Geo. 3. c. 32	Customs (No. 3) Act 1781	Encouragement of the Manufacture of Verdigris	The whole act.
21 Geo. 3. c. 34	Admeasurement of Coals Act 1781	Admeasurement of Coals, Westminster, &c.	The whole act.
21 Geo. 3. c. 51	Papists Act 1781	Registration by Papists of their Names and Real Estates	The whole act.
21 Geo. 3. c. 56	Duty on Almanacks Act 1781	Duty on Almanacks	The whole act.
21 Geo. 3. c. 60	Advance by Bank of England Act 1781	Agreement with Bank of England for advancing Two Millions	The whole act.
21 Geo. 3. c. 68	Criminal Law Act 1781	Punishment of Stealers of Copper, Brass, &c. fixed to Houses	The whole act.
21 Geo. 3. c. 69	Criminal Law (No. 2) Act 1781	Punishment of Receivers of stolen Pewter	The whole act.
22 Geo. 3. c. 21	Customs (No. 2) Act 1782	Customs Duties	The whole act.
22 Geo. 3. c. 28	Customs (No. 3) Act 1782	Additional Duty upon Tobacco and Snuff, and Duties upon Importation of Brandy and Arrack	The whole act.
22 Geo. 3. c. 31	Parliamentary Elections (Cricklade) Act 1782	Borough of Cricklade, Parliamentary Elections	So much of s. 5. as relates to the Time for the proper Officer proceeding to Election.
22 Geo. 3. c. 33	Stamp Duties Act 1782	Stamp Duty upon Bills and Notes	The whole act.
22 Geo. 3. c. 39	Salt Duties Act 1782	Duties on Salt	The whole act.
22 Geo. 3. c. 49	Customs (No. 4) Act 1782	Rectifying of a Mistake in an Act of this Session	The whole act.
22 Geo. 3. c. 58	Criminal Law (No. 2) Act 1782	Discovery and Punishment of Buyers and Receivers of Stolen Goods	The whole act.
22 Geo. 3. c. 61	Customs (No. 5) Act 1782	Duty upon Bees Wax imported	The whole act.
22 Geo. 3. c. 62	Militia (No. 2) Act 1782	Militia	The whole act.
22 Geo. 3. c. 64	Houses of Correction Act 1782	Houses of Correction	The whole act.
22 Geo. 3. c. 66	Customs and Excise Act 1782	Additional Duties of Customs and Excise	The whole act.
22 Geo. 3. c. 68	Taxation Act 1782	Duties on Beer and Coaches, &c.	The whole act.
23 Geo. 3. c. 11	Customs Act 1783	Customs, &c. Regulations	The whole act.
23 Geo. 3. c. 49	Stamp Duties (No. 1) Act 1783	Duties on Bills of Exchange, &c.	The whole act.
23 Geo. 3. c. 56	Customs (No. 2) Act 1783	Allowance of Drawback of Customs on Exportation of Rice	The whole act.
23 Geo. 3. c. 58	Stamp Duties (No. 2) Act 1783	Stamp Duties	The whole act.
23 Geo. 3. c. 62	Stamp Duties (No. 3) Act 1783	Stamp Duty on Licences for vending Medicines, &c.	The whole act.
23 Geo. 3. c. 63	Stage Coach, etc., Duty Act 1783	Duty on Stage Coaches, &c.	The whole act.
23 Geo. 3. c. 65	African Company Act 1783	African Company	The whole act.
23 Geo. 3. c. 75	Duties on Smalts, etc. Act 1783	Duties on Smalts and Tobacco	The whole act.
23 Geo. 3. c. 76	Duties on Wines, etc. Act 1783	Prevention of Frauds in Landing of Wines, &c.	The whole act.
23 Geo. 3. c. 77	Flax, etc., Manufacture Act 1783	Encouragement of Manufacture of Flax and Cotton	The whole act.
23 Geo. 3. c. 79	Coffee and Cocoa-nuts Act 1783	Encouragement of Growth of Coffee and Cocoa Nuts	The whole act.
23 Geo. 3. c. 82	Receipt of the Exchequer Act 1783	Regulation of the Receipt of the Exchequer	The whole act.
23 Geo. 3. c. 83	East India Company (No. 2) Act 1783	East India Company—Allowance of further Time for Payment of their Debt to the Public	The whole act.
23 Geo. 3. c. 88	Rogues and Vagabonds Act 1783	Rogues and Vagabonds	The whole act.
24 Geo. 3. Sess. 1. c. 7	Bills of Exchange, etc. Act 1783	Duties on Bills of Exchange, &c.	The whole act.
24 Geo. 3. Sess. 1. c. 12	Removal of Prisoners, etc. Act 1783	Removal of Prisoners and Transportation	The whole act.
24 Geo. 3. Sess. 1. c. 13	Militia Pay, etc. Act 1783	Militia Pay, &c.	The whole act.
24 Geo. 3. Sess. 2. c. 3	Woollen Manufactures, Suffolk Act 1784	Prevention of Frauds and Abuses by Persons employed in Woolcombing, &c., Suffolk.	Sections 19, 20, 21, and so much as relates to Limitation of Actions for anything done in pursuance of the Act, as to pleading of General Issue, and as to Treble Costs.
24 Geo. 3. Sess. 2. c. 11	Duties upon Candles Act 1784	Additional Duties upon Candles	The whole act.
24 Geo. 3. Sess. 2. c. 16	Customs (No. 2) Act 1784	Customs, &c. Duties	The whole, except so much as relates to the Duties payable to the Corporation of London.
24 Geo. 3. Sess. 2. c. 30	Licences for Retailing Beer, etc. Act 1784	Additional Duty upon Licences for retailing Beer, &c.	The whole act.
24 Geo. 3. Sess. 2. c. 34	East India Company (No. 3) Act 1784	East India Company	The whole act.
24 Geo. 3. Sess. 2. c. 36	Duties on Candles Act 1784	Duties on Wax Candles	The whole act.
24 Geo. 3. Sess. 2. c. 38	Commutation Act 1784	Duties on Tea, Inhabited Houses, and Cocoa Nuts and Coffee.	The whole act.
24 Geo. 3. Sess. 2. c. 40	Duties on Linens Act 1784	Duties on Linens, printed, painted, stained, or dyed in Great Britain, &c.	The whole act.
24 Geo. 3. Sess. 2. c. 41	Duties on Certain Licences Act 1784	Duties on Licences to be taken out by the Makers of and Dealers in certain Exciseable Commodities.	The whole act.
24 Geo. 3. Sess. 2. c. 43	Pawnbrokers Act 1784	Duties on Certificates for killing Game.	The whole act.
24 Geo. 3. Sess. 2. c. 46	Duties on Spirits Act 1784	Duties on Spirits	The whole act.
24 Geo. 3. Sess. 2. c. 48	Duties on Starch and Soap Act 1784	Duties on Starch and Soap	The whole act.
24 Geo. 3. Sess. 2. c. 49	Customs (No. 3) Act 1784	Duties upon Silk imported, and Drawbacks upon Exportation of Silk Manufactures.	The whole act.
24 Geo. 3. Sess. 2. c. 51	Hat Duties, etc. Act 1784	Duty on Licences for vending Hats, &c.	The whole act.
24 Geo. 3. Sess. 2. c. 53	Plate Duties Act 1784	Duties on Gold and Silver Plate imported, and on Gold and Silver wrought Plate made in Great Britain.	Customs Duties and Stamp Duties granted by.
24 Geo. 3. Sess. 2. c. 54	Gaols Act 1784	Gaols	The whole act.
24 Geo. 3. Sess. 2. c. 55	Houses of Correction Act 1784	Houses of Correction	The whole act.
25 Geo. 3. c. 22	Excise Act 1785	Distillation of Spirits in small Stills in certain Counties in the Highlands.	Duty granted by.
25 Geo. 3. c. 40	Woollen, etc., Manufactures, Bedfordshire Act 1785	Prevention of Frauds by Woolcombers, &c. in certain Counties.	Sections 21, 22, 23, and so much as relates to Limitation of Actions for anything done in pursuance of the Act, as to pleading of General Issue, and as to Treble Costs.
25 Geo. 3. c. 46	Transportation, etc. Act 1785	Transportation, &c.	The whole act.
25 Geo. 3. c. 48	Pawnbrokers Act 1785	Duties on Pawnbrokers Licences	Duties granted by.
25 Geo. 3. c. 49	Duties on Coachmakers' Licences, etc. Act 1785	Duties on Coachmakers Licences, and on Carriages built for Sale.	The whole act.
25 Geo. 3. c. 50	Game Certificates Act 1785	Duties on Certificates for killing Game.	The whole act.
25 Geo. 3. c. 58	Pilchard Fishery Act 1785	Encouragement of the Pilchard Fishery.	The whole act.
25 Geo. 3. c. 63	Salt Duties Act 1785	Salt Duties	The whole act.
25 Geo. 3. c. 65	Fisheries Act 1785	Encouragement of the Fisheries	The whole act.
25 Geo. 3. c. 69	Customs (No. 2) Act 1785	Duties upon Oil Flasks, &c.	The whole act.
25 Geo. 3. c. 72	Duties on Linens Act 1785	Duties on Linens printed, &c. in Great Britain, &c.	The whole act.
25 Geo. 3. c. 73	Allowance to Brewers Act 1785	Allowance to Brewers for Waste	The whole act.
25 Geo. 3. c. 74	Excise (No. 3) Act 1785	Duties on Tea—Exportation of Exciseable Commodities, &c.	Duties granted by, and Sections 16-21. and 25-31.
25 Geo. 3. c. 80	Stamps Act 1785	Duties on Attorneys Certificates, &c.	Duties granted by.
26 Geo. 3. c. 25	Fort William in Bengal Act 1786	Appointment of Governor General and Council of Fort William in Bengal.	The whole act.
26 Geo. 3. c. 36	Salt Duties, etc. Act 1786	Salt Duties—Importation and Exportation, Isle of Man.	The whole act.
26 Geo. 3. c. 38	Imprisonment of Debtors, etc. Act 1786	Imprisonment under Process of Small Debts Courts, &c.	The whole, except Sections 7. and 8.
26 Geo. 3. c. 40	Exports Act 1786	Productions of Manifests, &c.	The whole, except Sections 18. and 19.
26 Geo. 3. c. 41	Fisheries Act 1786	Fisheries in the Greenland Seas and Davis's Straits.	The whole act.
26 Geo. 3. c. 42	Customs Act 1786	Additional Duty upon Battens and Deals imported.	The whole act.
26 Geo. 3. c. 46	Salaries of Judges (Scotland) Act 1786	Salaries of Judges (Scotland)	The whole act.
26 Geo. 3. c. 48	Stamps Act 1786	Stamp Duties (Scotland)	Duties granted by.
26 Geo. 3. c. 49	Stamps (No. 2) Act 1786	Stamp Duties on Perfumery	The whole act.
26 Geo. 3. c. 51	Duties on Starch Act 1786	Duties on Starch	The whole act.
26 Geo. 3. c. 59	Excise Act 1786	Duties on Wine	Duties granted by.
26 Geo. 3. c. 64	Excise (No. 2) Act 1786	Duties on Spirits (Scotland)	Duties granted by.
26 Geo. 3. c. 73	Excise (No. 3) Act 1786	Duties on Spirits	Duties granted by.
26 Geo. 3. c. 74	Excise (No. 4) Act 1786	Additional Duties on Sweets, &c.	Excise Duty granted by.
26 Geo. 3. c. 77	Excise (No. 5) Act 1786	Excise Duties	Sections 5, 6, 7, 9.
26 Geo. 3. c. 82	Stamps (No. 3) Act 1786	Stamp Duties, and Duties on Policies of Fire for Insurance as to Property abroad.	Section 7.
26 Geo. 3. c. 90	Salt Duties Act 1786	Salt Duties; making of Mineral Alkali or Flux for Glass.	The whole act.
26 Geo. 3. c. 91	Madhouses Act 1786	Regulation of Madhouses	The whole act.
26 Geo. 3. c. 99	Fees (Officers of the Exchequer) Act 1786	Ascertaining of Fees to be taken by Officers of the Exchequer.	The whole act.
27 Geo. 3. c. 19	Shipping and Navigation Act 1787	Shipping and Navigation	The whole act.
27 Geo. 3. c. 27	Importation and Exportation Act 1787	Importation and Exportation, West Indies.	The whole act.
27 Geo. 3. c. 29	Competency of Witnesses Act 1787	Objections to Competency of Witnesses.	The whole act.
27 Geo. 3. c. 30	Duties on Spirit Licences Act 1787	Additional Duties on Licences for the retailing of Spirituous Liquors.	The whole act.
27 Geo. 3. c. 31	Exports Act 1787	Allowances to Dealers in Foreign Wines for certain Wines in Stock—Amendment of Excise Laws.	The whole, except Section 25.
27 Geo. 3. c. 43	County Palatine of Chester Act 1787	County Palatine of Chester—Swearing of Affidavits, &c.	The whole act.
28 Geo. 3. c. 27	Customs Act 1788	Reduction of Duties on Importation of Goods from the United Provinces.	The whole act.
28 Geo. 3. c. 28	Stamp Duties Act 1788	Exemption of Stipendiary Curates Licences from Stamp Duties.	The whole act.
28 Geo. 3. c. 33	Customs (No. 2) Act 1788	Alteration of Duties and Drawbacks on certain Wine, &c.	The whole act.
28 Geo. 3. c. 34	Quarantine and Customs Act 1788	Quarantine and Customs	The whole act.
28 Geo. 3. c. 37	Excise Act 1788	Certain Duties of Excise and Customs.	The whole, except Section 15.
28 Geo. 3. c. 38	Exportation (No. 2) Act 1788	Exportation of Sheep, &c.	The whole act.
28 Geo. 3. c. 49	Justices of the Peace Act 1788	Power for Justices to act out of the Counties in which they are.	The whole act.
28 Geo. 3. c. 53	Coal Trade Act 1788	Indemnifying Persons against certain Penalties incurred in the Coal Trade, and preventing Combinations in the Coal Trade.	The whole act.
29 Geo. 3. c. 26	Duty on Hawkers, etc. Act 1789	Duty on Hawkers, &c.	The whole act.
29 Geo. 3. c. 49	Duties on Horses and Carriage Act 1789	Duties on Horses and Carriages	The whole act.
29 Geo. 3. c. 50	Stamps Act 1789	Additional Duties on Newspapers, Advertisements, Cards, and Dice.	The whole act.
29 Geo. 3. c. 51	Stamps (No. 2) Act 1789	Additional Stamp Duties on Probate of Wills, &c.	Duties granted by.
29 Geo. 3. c. 53	Whale Fisheries Act 1789	Encouragement of the Newfoundland, Greenland, and Southern Whale Fisheries.	The whole act.
29 Geo. 3. c. 59	Customs Act 1789	Drawback on Exportation of Teas to Guernsey, &c.	The whole act.
29 Geo. 3. c. 63	Excise Act 1789	Exemption of Piece Goods woven in this Kingdom from Auction Duty. Licences for selling Spirituous Liquors, &c.	Sections 1, 2, 3, 4.
29 Geo. 3. c. 67	Gaols Act 1789	Regulation of Gaols	The whole act.
30 Geo. 3. c. 4	Customs Act 1790	Exemption of unwrought Tin, exported to certain Parts, from Customs Duty.	The whole act.
30 Geo. 3. c. 26	Auction Duty, etc. Act 1790	Exemption of Goods imported from Yucatan from Auction Duty, &c.	The whole act.
30 Geo. 3. c. 27	Settlers in American Colonies Act 1790	Encouragement of new Settlers in the Colonies of America.	The whole act.
30 Geo. 3. c. 28	Importation Act 1790	Duty on Cashew Gum imported from the West Indies.	The whole act.
30 Geo. 3. c. 37	Excise Act 1790	Duties on Spirits (Scotland)	Duty granted by.
30 Geo. 3. c. 38	Retail of Liquors Act 1790	Duties on Licences for retailing Wine, &c.	Duty granted by.
30 Geo. 3. c. 41	Importation Act 1790	Importations from North America of Rape Seed, &c.	The whole act.
31 Geo. 3. c. 1	Duties on Worts, Spirits, etc. Act 1791	Duties on Worts and Spirits, &c.	The whole act.
31 Geo. 3. c. 5	Importation and Exportation Act 1791	Additional Duties on Amount of Assessed Taxes.	The whole act.
31 Geo. 3. c. 15	Customs Act 1791	Duty on Sugar imported	The whole act.
31 Geo. 3. c. 21	Certificates for Killing Hares Act 1791	Duty on Certificates for killing Hares.	The whole act.
31 Geo. 3. c. 25	Stamps Act 1791	Duties on Bills of Exchange, &c.	Duties granted by.
31 Geo. 3. c. 26	Customs Act 1791	Importation of Seal Skins	The whole act.
31 Geo. 3. c. 27	Repeal of Certain Excise Duties Act 1791	Duties on Tanned Goat Skins, &c.	The whole act.
31 Geo. 3. c. 37	Importation Act 1791	Importation of Silk Crapes, &c. of the Manufacture of Italy.	The whole act.
31 Geo. 3. c. 42	Duties on Importation, etc. Act 1791	Indemnity in respect of a certain Order in Council. Duties on Importation of Salt Petre.	The whole act.
31 Geo. 3. c. 43	Continuance of Laws, etc. Act 1791	Continuance of several Laws, &c.	The whole act.
31 Geo. 3. c. 46	Gaols Act 1791	Regulation of Gaols	The whole act.
31 Geo. 3. c. 47	Importation and Exportation (No. 3) Act 1791	Importation and Exportation of Tobacco and Snuff.	The whole act.
31 Geo. 3. c. 51	Oyster Fisheries Act 1791	Protection of the Oyster Fisheries	The whole act.
31 Geo. 3. c. 55	Sierra Leone Company Act 1791	Establishment of the Sierra Leone Company.	The whole act.
31 Geo. 3. c. 56	Woollen, etc., Manufactures, Norfolk Act 1791	Prevention of Frauds and Abuses by Wool Combers, &c. in Norfolk.	Sections 22, 23, 24, and so much as relates to Limitation of Actions for anything done in pursuance of the Act, as to pleading of General Issue, and as to Treble Costs.
32 Geo. 3. c. 9	Exportation Act 1792	Exportation of Tea to Ireland or America.	The whole act.
32 Geo. 3. c. 10	Offences Against Excise Laws Act 1792	Execution of Warrants for Apprehension of Persons convicted of Offences against Excise Laws.	The whole act.
32 Geo. 3. c. 11	Sales by Auction Act 1792	Sales by Auction	The whole act.
32 Geo. 3. c. 12	Reduction of National Debt Act 1792	Grant towards Reduction of National Debt.	The whole act.
32 Geo. 3. c. 22	Fishery Act 1792	Encouragement of Fisheries in Greenland Seas and Davis's Straits.	The whole act.
32 Geo. 3. c. 37	Importation and Exportation Act 1792	Importation and Exportation at certain Ports.	The whole act.
32 Geo. 3. c. 41	Auction Duty Act 1792	Auction Duty	The whole act.
32 Geo. 3. c. 45	Rogues and Vagabonds Act 1792	Rogues and Vagabonds	The whole act.
32 Geo. 3. c. 48	Middlesex Sessions Act 1792	Sessions of the Peace and of Oyer and Terminer for Middlesex.	The whole act.
32 Geo. 3. c. 49	Importation Act 1792	Importation of Quercitron, &c.	The whole act.
32 Geo. 3. c. 51	Stamp Duty Act 1792	Exemption of Letters between Merchants from Stamp Duty.	The whole act.
32 Geo. 3. c. 54	Customs (No. 3) Act 1792	Duties on Foreign printed, &c., Papers.	The whole act.
32 Geo. 3. c. 55	Reduction of National Debt Act 1792	Reduction of National Debt	The whole act.
32 Geo. 3. c. 65	Levant Trade Act 1792	Trade into Levant Seas	The whole act.
33 Geo. 3. c. 5	Debtors Relief Act 1793	Relief of Debtors from Imprisonment.	The whole act.
33 Geo. 3. c. 22	Reduction of National Debt Act 1793	Grant towards Reduction of National Debt.	The whole act.
33 Geo. 3. c. 23	Table Beer Act 1793	Quality of Table Beer	The whole act.
33 Geo. 3. c. 28	National Debt Act 1793	Loan on Annuities, Excise Duties, &c.	So much as relates to Excise Duties, Assessed Taxes, Consolidated Fund, and Treble Costs.
33 Geo. 3. c. 29	Exchequer Bills Act 1793	Exchequer Bills for Loans	The whole act.
33 Geo. 3. c. 30	Forgeries and Frauds in Bank Transfers Act 1793	Prevention of Forgeries and Frauds in Transfer of Funds transferable at the Bank of England.	The whole act.
33 Geo. 3. c. 33	Salt Act 1793	Making of Salt	The whole act.
33 Geo. 3. c. 57	Warehoused Tobacco, etc. Act 1793	Regulation of warehoused Tobacco	The whole act.
33 Geo. 3. c. 58	Southern Whale Fishery Act 1793	Premiums to Ships carrying on Southern Whale Fishery.	The whole act.
33 Geo. 3. c. 61	Distilleries, etc. (Scotland) Act 1793	Distilleries (Scotland)	Duties granted by.
33 Geo. 3. c. 63	Importation Act 1793	Importation into Great Britain of certain Goods imported into Ireland.	The whole act.
33 Geo. 3. c. 68	Wales, Chester, etc. (Courts) Act 1793	Judgments of Courts of Great Sessions, &c. of Wales, Cheshire, Lancaster, and Durham, and County Courts in Wales.	So much as relates to Court of Great Sessions in Wales.
33 Geo. 3. c. 69	Excise (Scotland) Act 1793	Duties on Coal, Licences for Sale of Spirits, &c. (Scotland).	Duties granted by.
34 Geo. 3. c. 2	Duties on Worts, Wash, etc. Act 1794	Additional Duties upon Worts, Wash, &c. in England, and upon Spirits in Scotland.	The whole act.
34 Geo. 3. c. 3	Duties on Spirits, etc. Act 1794	Additional Duties on Spirits imported.	The whole act.
34 Geo. 3. c. 4	Duties on Spirits, etc. (No. 2) Act 1794	Duties on Spirits and Sugar imported.	The whole act.
34 Geo. 3. c. 14	Stamps (No. 3) Act 1794	Stamp Duties on Indentures of Clerkship to Solicitors and Attornies.	Duties granted by.
34 Geo. 3. c. 21	National Debt (No. 2) Act 1794	Annuities and Payment of Navy and Victualling Bills.	Section 18.
34 Geo. 3. c. 33	Excise Duties Act 1794	Duties of Excise	The whole act.
34 Geo. 3. c. 42	Prize Act 1794	Grant to Foreign Ships put under His Majesty's Protection of the Privileges of Prize Ships, &c.	The whole act.
34 Geo. 3. c. 45	Criminal Court, Norfolk Island Act 1794	Establishment of a Court of Criminal Jurisdiction in Norfolk Island.	The whole act.
34 Geo. 3. c. 48	Reduction of National Debt Act 1794	Grant towards Reduction of National Debt.	The whole act.
34 Geo. 3. c. 63	New Method of Tanning Act 1794	Allowing of the Exercise of an Invention of a new Method of tanning Hides and Skins.	The whole act.
34 Geo. 3. c. 75	Crown Land Revenues Act 1794	Management of Land Revenues of Crown.	The whole act.
35 Geo. 3. c. 10	Excise Act 1795	Additional Duties of Excise on Foreign Wine and Sweets.	The whole act.
35 Geo. 3. c. 11	Excise (No. 2) Act 1795	Additional Duties of Excise on Worts, Wash, &c. for Spirits, and Use of Wheat in making Wash.	The whole act.
35 Geo. 3. c. 12	Excise (No. 3) Act 1795	Additional Duties of Excise on Foreign Spirits.	The whole act.
35 Geo. 3. c. 13	Excise (No. 4) Act 1795	Additional Duties of Excise on Tea, Coffee, and Cocoa Nuts.	The whole act.
35 Geo. 3. c. 20	Customs Act 1795	Duties of Customs	The whole act.
35 Geo. 3. c. 23	National Debt (No. 2) Act 1795	Grant towards the Reduction of the National Debt.	The whole act.
35 Geo. 3. c. 30	Stamps Act 1795	Stamp Duties	The whole act.
35 Geo. 3. c. 31	Smuggling, etc. Act 1795	Prevention of Smuggling	The whole act.
35 Geo. 3. c. 38	Continuance of Laws Act 1795	Continuance of various Laws	The whole act.
35 Geo. 3. c. 49	Duty on Hair Powder Act 1795	Duty on Hair Powder Certificates	The whole act.
35 Geo. 3. c. 59	Duties on Scotch Distilleries Act 1795	Duties on Scotch Distilleries, &c.	The whole act.
35 Geo. 3. c. 89	Duties on Spirits Act 1795	Duties on Spirits	The whole act.
35 Geo. 3. c. 91	Hawkers and Pedlars Act 1795	Regulation of Hawkers and Pedlars	The whole act.
35 Geo. 3. c. 93	Loan to Emperor of Germany Act 1795	Guarantee of Dividends on Loan to Emperor of Germany.	The whole act.
35 Geo. 3. c. 96	Relief of Revenue Prisoners Act 1795	Relief of Persons detained in Gaol for Want of Bail in certain Cases relating to the Revenue.	The whole act.
35 Geo. 3. c. 97	Excise (No. 5) Act 1795	Duties of Excise on tanned Hides and Skins.	The whole act.
35 Geo. 3. c. 109	Carriage Duties Act 1795	Carriage Duties	The whole act.
35 Geo. 3. c. 110	Drawback (No. 2) Act 1795	Drawback on Exportation of Sugar	The whole act.
35 Geo. 3. c. 117	Importation (No. 4) Act 1795	Importation of Rape and other Seeds	The whole act.
35 Geo. 3. c. 118	Warehousing of Wines, etc. Act 1795	Warehousing of Wines, &c.	The whole act.
36 Geo. 3. c. 13	Excise Act 1795	Additional Excise Duties on Tobacco and Snuff.	The whole act.
36 Geo. 3. c. 14	Additional Taxes Act 1795	Additional Duties on Amount of Duties under Commissioners of Taxes.	The whole act.
36 Geo. 3. c. 18	Drawbacks and Bounties Act 1795	Drawbacks and Bounties on Exportation of Sugar.	The whole act.
36 Geo. 3. c. 19	Duties on Salt Act 1795	Duties on Salt	The whole act.
36 Geo. 3. c. 22	Making of Bread Act 1795	Making of Bread	The whole act.
36 Geo. 3. c. 53	Exportation Act 1796	Exportation of Rock Salt	The whole act.
36 Geo. 3. c. 55	Free Ports Act 1796	Making of Port of Scarborough (Island of Tobago) a free Port.	The whole act.
36 Geo. 3. c. 78	Customs Act 1796	Duty on Mahogany imported	The whole act.
36 Geo. 3. c. 79	Customs (No. 2) Act 1796	Duty on Black Lead imported	The whole act.
36 Geo. 3. c. 105	National Debt (No. 2) Act 1796	Grant towards Reduction of the National Debt.	The whole act.
36 Geo. 3. c. 113	Importation (No. 2) Act 1796	Importation of Arrowroot, &c.	The whole act.
36 Geo. 3. c. 123	Duties on Wines, etc. Act 1796	Additional Duties on Foreign Wines and British Sweets.	The whole act.
36 Geo. 3. c. 125	Duty on Hats Act 1796	Duty on Hats	The whole act.
37 Geo. 3. c. 14	Excise Act 1796	Excise Duties on various Matters	The whole act.
37 Geo. 3. c. 15	Customs Act 1796	Duties of Customs	The whole act.
37 Geo. 3. c. 16	Stage Coach Duties Act 1796	Additional Stage Coach Duties	The whole act.
37 Geo. 3. c. 17	Duties on Distilleries (Scotland), etc. Act 1796	Additional Duties on Distilleries (Scotland), &c.	The whole act.
37 Geo. 3. c. 18	Postage Act 1796	Postage	The whole act.
37 Geo. 3. c. 26	Navy Victualling and Transport Bills Act 1796	More speedy Payment of Navy, Victualling, and Transport Bills.	The whole act.
37 Geo. 3. c. 28	Bank of England Notes under 5l Act 1797	Issue of Bank of England Notes under 5l.	The whole act.
37 Geo. 3. c. 59	Loan to Emperor of Germany Act 1797	Loan to the Emperor of Germany	The whole act.
37 Geo. 3. c. 63	Foreign Ships Act 1797	Grant to Foreign Ships put under His Majesty's Protection of the Privileges of Prize Ships, &c.	The whole act.
37 Geo. 3. c. 69	Taxes Act 1797	Additional Duties on Amount of certain Duties under the Management of Commissioners of Taxes.	The whole act.
37 Geo. 3. c. 77	Free Ports Act 1797	Making of Port of San Josef in Trinidad a free Port.	The whole act.
37 Geo. 3. c. 102	Scotch Distilleries Act 1797	Scotch Distilleries	The whole act.
37 Geo. 3. c. 105	House Duties Act 1797	Additional Duties on Inhabited Houses.	The whole act.
37 Geo. 3. c. 108	Duties on Clocks and Watches Act 1797	Duties on Clocks and Watches	The whole act.
37 Geo. 3. c. 110	Customs Act 1797	Customs Duties	The whole act.
37 Geo. 3. c. 111	Stamps (No. 3) Act 1797	Additional Stamp Duty on Deeds	The whole act.
37 Geo. 3. c. 115	National Debt (No. 3) Act 1797	Grant towards Reduction of National Debt.	The whole act.
37 Geo. 3. c. 118	Slave Trade (No. 2) Act 1797	Height between Decks of Vessels carrying Slaves.	The whole act.
37 Geo. 3. c. 121	Southern Whale Fisheries Act 1797	Encouragement of the Southern Whale Fisheries.	The whole act.
37 Geo. 3. c. 124	Bankrupts Act 1797	Frauds by Bankrupts Prevention	The whole act.
37 Geo. 3. c. 141	Postage Act 1797	Sending and receiving of Letters free of Postage by Deputy Clerk of House of Commons.	The whole act.
38 Geo. 3. c. 13	Augmentation of 60th Regiment Act 1797	Augmentation of 60th Regiment by Enlistment of Foreigners, &c.	The whole act.
38 Geo. 3. c. 16	Taxation Act 1798	Grant of an Aid and Contribution for the Prosecution of the War.	The whole act.
38 Geo. 3. c. 39	Importation and Exportation Act 1798	Importation and Exportation, West Indies.	The whole act.
38 Geo. 3. c. 42	Excise Act 1798	Excise Duty on Tea, &c.	The whole act.
38 Geo. 3. c. 43	Duties on Salt Act 1798	Additional Duties on Salt	The whole act.
38 Geo. 3. c. 45	Debts Due to Swiss Government Act 1798	Purchase of Debts due to the Governments of Switzerland, &c.	The whole act.
38 Geo. 3. c. 47	National Debt (No. 2) Act 1798	Grant for Reduction of National Debt.	The whole act.
38 Geo. 3. c. 50	Aliens Act 1798	Aliens	The whole act.
38 Geo. 3. c. 53	Armorial Bearings Act 1798	Duties on Certificates issued with respect to Armorial Bearings or Ensigns.	The whole act.
38 Geo. 3. c. 54	Excise (No. 2) Act 1798	Laws of Excise Amendment	The whole act.
38 Geo. 3. c. 62	Assize of Bread Act 1798	Assize of Bread	The whole act.
38 Geo. 3. c. 71	Copyright Act 1798	Copyright of Models, &c.	The whole act.
38 Geo. 3. c. 81	Taxation (No. 2) Act 1798	Aid and Contribution for Prosecution of the War.	The whole act.
38 Geo. 3. c. 85	Stamps (No. 2) Act 1798	Stamp Duties	The whole, except Sections 4 and 5.
38 Geo. 3. c. 89	Salt Duties Act 1798	Salt Duties	The whole act.
38 Geo. 3. c. 92	Scotch Distilleries Act 1798	Scotch Distilleries	The whole act.
39 Geo. 3. c. 13	Duties on Income Act 1799	Duties on Income	The whole act.
39 Geo. 3. c. 22	Duties on Income (No. 2) Act 1799	Duties on Income	The whole act.
39 Geo. 3. c. 38	Continuance of Laws (No. 2) Act 1799	Continuance of various Acts relating to Importation, &c.	The whole act.
39 Geo. 3. c. 42	Duties on Income (No. 3) Act 1799	Duties on Income	The whole act.
39 Geo. 3. c. 45	Punishment of Burning in the Hand Act 1799	Making perpetual of Enactment altering Punishment of Burning in the Hand.	The whole act.
39 Geo. 3. c. 63	Duties on Sugar, etc. Act 1799	Duties on Sugar and Coffee	The whole act.
39 Geo. 3. c. 64	National Debt (No. 2) Act 1799	Grant for Reduction of National Debt.	The whole act.
39 Geo. 3. c. 65	Bounty on Pilchards Act 1799	Bounty on Pilchards exported and Salt Duties.	The whole act.
39 Geo. 3. c. 72	Duties on Income (No. 4) Act 1799	Duties on Income	The whole act.
39 Geo. 3. c. 75	Importation (No. 2) Act 1799	Prohibition of Exportation of Light Silver Coin of the Realm, &c.	The whole act.
39 Geo. 3. c. 77	Salt Duties Act 1799	Salt Duties	The whole act.
39 Geo. 3. c. 78	Duties on Distilleries (Scotland) Act 1799	Duties on Distilleries (Scotland)	The whole act.
39 Geo. 3. c. 80	Slave Trade Act 1799	Carrying of Slaves from Africa	The whole act.
39 Geo. 3. c. 83	Auditors of Land Revenue Act 1799	Transfer to Commissioners for auditing Public Accounts of Duties of Auditors of Land Revenue.	The whole act.
39 Geo. 3. c. 85	Embezzlement Act 1799	Embezzlement	The whole act.
39 Geo. 3. c. 94	Master of the Mint Act 1799	Salary of Master and Worker of the Mint.	The whole, except s. 5.
39 Geo. 3. c. 99	Trade to the Levant Seas Act 1799	Trade to the Levant Seas, and Reduction of certain Export Duty.	The whole act.
39 Geo. 3. c. 104	Augmentation of 60th Regiment Act 1799	Augmentation of the 60th Regiment by Enlistment of Foreigners.	The whole act.
39 Geo. 3. c. 107	Stamps (No. 3) Act 1799	Stamp Duties on Bills of Exchange and Promissory Notes.	Duties imposed, and s. 25.
39 & 40 Geo. 3. c.11	Appropriation of Certain Duties Act 1799	Appropriation of certain Duties	The whole act.
39 & 40 Geo. 3. c. 23	Excise Act 1800	Duties of Excise on Spirits and Tea	The whole act.
39 & 40 Geo. 3. c. 26	National Debt (No. 2) Act 1800	Grant towards Reduction of National Debt.	The whole act.
39 & 40 Geo. 3. c. 32	Duties on Hair Powder, etc. Act 1800	Exemptions from Duties on Hair Powder, and Horses of Officers in the Navy, and Persons in Volunteer Cavalry Corps.	The whole act.
39 & 40 Geo. 3. c. 44	Militia Allowances Act 1800	Allowances to Adjutants, &c. of Militia (England.)	The whole act.
39 & 40 Geo. 3. c. 45	Duties on Glass, etc. Act 1800	Perpetuation of an Act relating to Duties on Glass, and Continuance of various Acts.	The whole act.
39 & 40 Geo. 3. c. 49	Duties on Income Act 1800	Duties on Income	The whole act.
39 & 40 Geo. 3. c. 55	Salaries of Scotch Judges Act 1800	Salaries of Scotch Judges	The whole act.
39 & 40 Geo. 3. c. 60	Customs (No. 3) Act 1800	Duties on Wine, &c., imported from the Cape of Good Hope.	The whole act.
39 & 40 Geo. 3. c. 72	Administration of Estates (Probate) Act 1800	Amendment of Law relating to Stamp Duties.	Sections 3, 4, 5, 9, 11, 12, and 19.
39 & 40 Geo. 3. c. 73	Duties on Distillation Act 1800	Duties on Distillation (Scotland)	The whole act.
39 & 40 Geo. 3. c. 74	Price and Assise of Bread Act 1800	Price and Assize of Bread	The whole act.
39 & 40 Geo. 3. c. 95	Indemnity to Printers Act 1800	Indemnity to Printers of Public Documents against certain Penalties.	The whole act.
39 & 40 Geo. 3. c. 96	Duties on Income (No. 2) Act 1800	Duties on Income	The whole act.
41 Geo. 3. (G.B.) c. 21	Use of Salt Duty Free, etc. Act 1800	Use of Salt, Duty-free, in preserving Fish; Protection from Impressment; and Discontinuance of Bounty on White Herrings.	The whole act.
41 Geo. 3. (G.B.) c. 22	Expenditure in the West Indies Act 1800	Appointment of Commissioners for Examination of Accounts of Expenditure in the West Indies during present War.	The whole act.
41 Geo. 3. (G.B.) c. 23	Free Ports Act 1800	Making of the Port of Amsterdam, in the Island of Curaçao, a Free Port.	The whole act.
41 Geo. 3. (G.B.) c. 25	Importation (No. 5) Act 1800	Importation of undressed Hemp from Countries within the Limits of the exclusive Trade of the East India Company, free of duty.	The whole act.
41 Geo. 3. (G.B.) c. 30	Quarantine, etc. Act 1800	Amendment of Act for erecting a Lazaret on Chetney Hill, and for reducing into One Act the laws relating to Quarantine, &c.	The whole act.
41 Geo. 3. (U.K.) c.10	Taxation Act 1801	Additional Stamp Duties on Bills, &c. and Deeds	The whole act.
41 Geo. 3. (U.K.) c. 28	Taxation Act 1801	Certain Customs Duties	The whole act.
41 Geo. 3. (U.K.) c. 29	Taxation Act 1801	Additional Duties on Spirits imported into Scotland, &c.	The whole act.
41 Geo. 3. (U.K.) c. 33	Taxation (No. 5) Act 1801	Duties on Tea, Sugar, and Coals	The whole act.
41 Geo. 3. (U.K.) c. 42	Taxation Act 1801	Sale of Elephant Oil free of Auction Duty (Great Britain).	The whole act.
41 Geo. 3. (U.K.) c. 48	Sale of Wine, etc. Act 1801	Licences for Sale of Wine, &c. (Ireland)	The whole act.
41 Geo. 3. (U.K.) c. 62	Taxation (No. 10) Act 1801	Exemption of Irish Members of Parliament, &c. from Payment of certain Duties.	The whole act.
41 Geo. 3. (U.K.) c. 65	National Debt (No. 2) Act 1801	Additional Duties (Redemption of National Debt).	The whole act.
41 Geo. 3. (U.K.) c. 68	Importation, etc. Act 1801	Duties and Drawbacks on Copper - Duties on Tea, Spirits, &c. (Ireland)	The whole act.
41 Geo. 3. (U.K.) c. 74	Taxation (No. 13) Act 1801	Drawbacks on Sugar, &c. (Ireland)	The whole act.
41 Geo. 3. (U.K.) c. 80	Indemnity to Certain Printers Act 1801	Indemnity to Printers of Public Documents against certain Penalties.	The whole act.
41 Geo. 3. (U.K.) c. 86	Probate Duty Act 1801	Additional Stamp Duties on Cards, Dice, Probates of Wills, Deeds, &c. (except as to Licences, &c., Great Britain).	The whole, except Section 3.
41 Geo. 3. (U.K.) c. 87	Customs Act 1801	Duties on Customs on Playing Cards (Great Britain)	The whole act.
41 Geo. 3. (U.K.) c. 89	Customs (No. 2) Act 1801	Duty on Importation of Statues	The whole act.
41 Geo. 3. (U.K.) c. 91	Excise Act 1801	Repeal, &c. of certain Revenue Duties.	The whole act.
41 Geo. 3. (U.K.) c. 98	Militia Pay (Ireland) Act 1801	Militia Pay (Ireland)	The whole act.
42 Geo. 3. c. 14	Manufacture of Starch Act 1801	Manufacture of Starch from Potatoes, &c.	The whole act.
42 Geo. 3. c. 20	Duties on Rum, etc. Act 1802	Duties on Rum for Ships' Stores; Exportation and Importation, &c.	The whole act.
42 Geo. 3. c. 24	Duties on Cinnamon, etc. Act 1802	Duties on Cinnamon, Cassia Lignea, &c.	The whole act.
42 Geo. 3. c. 34	Duties on Windows, etc. Act 1802	Additional Duties on Windows and on Inhabited Houses (Great Britain).	The whole act.
42 Geo. 3. c. 37	Duties on Servants, etc. Act 1802	Additional Duties on Servants, Carriages, Horses, Mules, and Dogs (Great Britain).	The whole act.
42 Geo. 3. c. 38	Duties on Beer, etc. Act 1802	Additional Duties on Beer, Ale, Malt, and Hops (Great Britain) and Spirits (Scotland), &c.	The whole act.
42 Geo. 3. c. 43	Duties of Customs and Tonnage Act 1802	Duties of Customs and Tonnage (Great Britain).	The whole act.
42 Geo. 3. c. 47	Duties on Sugar, etc. Act 1802	Duties on Sugar and Coffee exported, &c. (Great Britain).	The whole act.
42 Geo. 3. c. 56	Militia Allowances Act 1802	Stamp Duties	Duties imposed.
42 Geo. 3. c. 61	Irish Mariners, etc. Act 1802	Encouragement of Irish Mariners, &c.	The whole act.
42 Geo. 3. c. 66	Yeomanry and Volunteers Act 1802	Yeomanry and Volunteers	The whole act.
42 Geo. 3. c. 70	Public Accounts Act 1802	Public Accounts	The whole act.
42 Geo. 3. c. 71	National Debt (No. 3) Act 1802	Reduction of the National Debt	The whole act.
42 Geo. 3. c. 77	Pacific Ocean Fisheries Act 1802	Pacific Ocean Fisheries	The whole act.
42 Geo. 3. c. 93	Excise Act 1802	Duties of Excise on Wines, Home made Spirits, &c.	The whole act.
42 Geo. 3. c. 103	Repeal, etc., of Certain Duties Act 1802	Repeal, &c. of certain Duties (Ireland).	The whole act.
42 Geo. 3. c. 112	National Debt (No. 4) Act 1802	Grant towards the Redemption of National Debt.	The whole act.
42 Geo. 3. c. 117	Import and Export Duties Act 1802	Additional Import and Export Duties (Ireland).	The whole act.
43 Geo. 3. c. 2	Militia (Ireland) Act 1802	Enrolment of Militia (Ireland)	The whole act.
43 Geo. 3. c. 7	Navy, Victualling and Transport Bills Act 1802	Payment of Navy, Victualling, and Transport Bills.	The whole act.
43 Geo. 3. c. 19	Militia Act (No. 1) 1803	Militia, Extension of Period of Training and Exercise (Great Britain).	The whole act.
43 Geo. 3. c. 33	Militia (Ireland) Act 1803	Enrolment of Militia (Ireland)	The whole act.
43 Geo. 3. c. 48	East India Company Act 1803	East India Company Volunteer Corps.	The whole act.
43 Geo. 3. c. 69	Excise Act 1803	Excise Duties (Great Britain)	The whole act.
43 Geo. 3. c. 90	Southern Whale Fishery Act 1803	Enlargement of the Limits of the Southern Whale Fishery.	The whole act.
43 Geo. 3. c. 92	Duties, etc. (Ireland) Act 1803	Import and Export Duties, &c. (Ireland).	The whole act.
43 Geo. 3. c. 98	Collection of Revenue, etc. (Ireland) Act 1803	Collection of Revenue upon Malt; Regulation of Distilling Trade (Ireland).	The whole act.
43 Geo. 3. c. 113	Casting Away of Vessels, etc. Act 1803	Wilful casting away of Vessels, &c.	The whole act.
43 Geo. 3. c. 118	Discovery of Longitude at Sea, etc. Act 1803	Discovery of Longitude at Sea, &c.	The whole act.
43 Geo. 3. c. 124	Defence of the Realm (Scotland) (No. 2) Act 1803	Additional Military Force, and Militia; Exemptions from (Scotland).	The whole act.
43 Geo. 3. c. 130	Duties on Auctioneers, etc. Act 1803	Duties on Auctioneers, &c.	The whole act.
43 Geo. 3. c. 134	Prize Goods Act 1803	Additional Customs Duty on Lignum Quassiæ (Great Britain).	The whole act.
43 Geo. 3. c. 152	Pilots of Dover, etc. Act 1803	Pilotage of Dover, Deal, and Isle of Thanet.	The whole act.
43 Geo. 3. c. 158	Glebe Houses (Ireland) Act 1803	Grant for building Glebe Houses (Ireland).	The whole act.
44 Geo. 3. c. 18	Volunteers and Yeomanry (Great Britain) Act 1803	Volunteers and Yeomanry (Great Britain).	The whole act.
44 Geo. 3. c. 33	Militia (Ireland) Act 1804	Augmentation of Militia (Ireland)	The whole act.
44 Geo. 3. c. 44	Newfoundland Trade Act 1804	Newfoundland Trade, Exemption of Vessels from Passenger Act.	The whole act.
44 Geo. 3. c. 49	Excise Act 1804	Additional Duties on Wine imported into Ireland.	The whole act.
44 Geo. 3. c. 58	Public Accounts Act 1804	Laying of certain Public Accounts before Parliament (Ireland).	The whole act.
44 Geo. 3. c. 71	Counterfeit Dollars and Tokens Act 1804	Counterfeit Dollars and Tokens (England and Ireland).	The whole act.
44 Geo. 3. c. 102	Habeas Corpus Act 1804	Habeas Corpus ad Testificandum (England and Ireland).	Section 2.
45 Geo. 3. c. 14	Salt Duties Act 1805	Additional Salt Duties (Great Britain).	The whole act.
45 Geo. 3. c. 29	Customs (No. 2) Act 1805	Additional Customs Duties (Great Britain).	The whole act.
45 Geo. 3. c. 30	Excise Act 1805	Additional Duties of Excise (Great Britain).	The whole act.
45 Geo. 3. c. 42	Counterfeiting Bank of Ireland Silver Tokens, etc. Act 1805	Counterfeiting of Bank of Ireland Silver Tokens, &c.	The whole act.
45 Geo. 3. c. 44	Customs (No. 3) Act 1805	Duty on Slaves brought Coastwise within Great Britain.	The whole act.
45 Geo. 3. c. 45	Customs (No. 4) Act 1805	Additional Duties on Wine imported, and Drawbacks to Naval Officers.	The whole act.
45 Geo. 3. c. 53	Collection of Malt Duties, etc. Act 1805	Collection of Malt Duties and Regulation of the Trade of Maltsters (Ireland).	The whole act.
45 Geo. 3. c. 67	Duties on Spanish Red Wine Act 1805	Additional Duties on Spanish Red Wine (Great Britain).	The whole act.
45 Geo. 3. c. 75	Offices in the Court of Chancery Act 1805	Appointments to certain Offices in Ireland, &c., made during Vacancy of the Office of Register, &c.	The whole act.
45 Geo. 3. c. 88	Customs (No. 5) Act 1805	Duties on Cochineal Dust and Granilla.	The whole act.
45 Geo. 3. c. 91	Auditing of Public Accounts Act 1805	Appointment of additional Commissioners for auditing Public Accounts.	The whole act.
45 Geo. 3. c. 93	Drawbacks and Bounties Act 1805	Drawbacks and Bounties on Sugar exported from Great Britain.	The whole act.
45 Geo. 3. c. 98	Drawback on Linens Act 1805	Increase of Drawback on Linens exported from Great Britain to West Indies.	The whole act.
45 Geo. 3. c. 100	Distillation of Spirits Act 1805	Distillation of Spirits in England for Exportation to Scotland, and vice versâ, &c.	The whole act.
45 Geo. 3. c. 103	Customs (No. 6) Act 1805	Additional Duties on Importation of Straw Platting, Hats, and Bonnets.	The whole act.
45 Geo. 3. c. 123	Annuity to Duke of Atholl, etc. Act 1805	Grant of Annuity to Duke of Atholl and Heirs general of the Seventh Earl of Derby.	The whole act.
46 Geo. 3. c. 11	Exportation Act 1806	Importation of Corn, &c. for the Use of His Majesty's Forces and Prisoners of War.	The whole act.
46 Geo. 3. c. 35	Stamps (Ireland) Act 1806	Exemption from Stamp Duties of Notes, &c. of the Bank of Ireland.	The whole act.
46 Geo. 3. c. 38	Customs and Excise Act 1806	Customs and Excise Duties upon Tobacco.	The whole act.
46 Geo. 3. c. 44	Consolidated Fund Act 1806	Certain Wine Duties carried to the Consolidated Fund.	The whole act.
46 Geo. 3. c. 45	Treasury of the Ordnance Act 1806	Office of Treasurer of the Ordnance	The whole act.
46 Geo. 3. c. 52	Slave Trade Act 1806	Slave Trade	The whole act.
46 Geo. 3. c. 64	Stamps (Ireland) Act 1806	Stamp Duties (Ireland)	The whole act.
46 Geo. 3. c. 75	Excise (No. 2) Act 1806	Office of Receiver of Customs and Excise Duties (England).	The whole act.
46 Geo. 3. c. 78	Postage (No. 2) Act 1806	Increase in Amount of Assessed Taxes (Great Britain)	The whole act.
46 Geo. 3. c. 87	Customs (Ireland) Act 1806	Consolidation and Amendment of Laws relating to Collection of Customs Duties, and Payment of Drawbacks (Ireland)	The whole act.
46 Geo. 3. c. 97	Grain Between Great Britain and Ireland Act 1806	Free Intercourse of Grain between Great Britain and Ireland	The whole act.
46 Geo. 3. c. 102	Duties on Stills, etc. (Scotland) Act 1806	Duties on Stills and Spirits, &c. (Scotland)	The whole act.
46 Geo. 3. c. 109	Bounty on Sugar, etc. Act 1806	Bounty on refined Sugar, &c. (Great Britain)	The whole act.
46 Geo. 3. c. 110	Bounty on Silk Manufactures Act 1806	Additional Bounty on Silk Manufactures (Great Britain)	The whole act.
46 Geo. 3. c. 114	Drawback Act 1806	Drawback on Linens exported to the West Indies	The whole act.
46 Geo. 3. c. 115	Exportation (No. 3) Act 1806	Exportation of Raisins, Currants, and Figs from Great Britain, Duty-free	The whole act.
46 Geo. 3. c. 124	Irish Militia Act 1806	Volunteers from Irish Militia	The whole act.
46 Geo. 3. c. 128	Masters in Chancery Act 1806	Salaries and retiring Allowances to Masters in Chancery	The whole act.
46 Geo. 3. c. 138	Excise (No. 4) Act 1806	Excise; Counterveiling Duty on Hops, Window Glass, &c. (Ireland); Exemption of Draining Tiles	Duties and Drawbacks
46 Geo. 3. c. 142	Woods and Forests Act 1806	Office of Surveyor-General of Woods and Forests	The whole act.
46 Geo. 3. c. 151	Crown Lands Act 1806	Crown Lands devised in Trust for former Rents for Charitable Institutions, &c.	The whole act.
47 Geo. 3 Sess. 1. c. 7	Interchange of Grain Between Great Britain and Ireland Act 1807	Interchange of Grain between Great Britain and Ireland	The whole act.
47 Geo. 3 Sess. 1. c. 12	Customs (Ireland) Act 1807	Abolition and Regulation of Offices in Customs (Ireland)	The whole act.
47 Geo. 3 Sess. 1. c. 18	Excise Duties and Taxes (Ireland) Act 1807	Excise Duties and Taxes (Ireland)	Duties on Sweets and Mead Wines
47 Geo. 3 Sess. 1. c. 19	Drawbacks (Ireland) Act 1807	Brewing and Malting, &c. (Ireland)	The whole act.
47 Geo. 3 Sess. 1. c. 35	Excise (Ireland) Act 1807	Duties on Excise Licences (Ireland)	The whole act.
47 Geo. 3 Sess. 1. c. 36	Abolition of Slave Trade Act 1807	Abolition of the Slave Trade	The whole act.
47 Geo. 3 Sess. 1. c. 38	Paper Duties (Ireland) Act 1807	Paper Duties (Ireland)	The whole act.
47 Geo. 3 Sess. 1. c. 40	Duties, etc., on Malt, etc. (Ireland) Act 1807	Duties, &c. on Malt and Spirits (Ireland)	The whole act.
47 Geo. 3 Sess. 1. c. 47	Prize Act 1807	Prize Money on Captures by Foreign, in conjunction with British, Ships	The whole act.
47 Geo. 3 Sess. 1. c. 50	Stamps (Ireland) Act 1807	Stamp Duties (Ireland)	The whole act.
47 Geo. 3 Sess. 1. c. 55	Charge of Loan Act 1807	Charge of Loan upon War Duties of Customs, &c.	The whole act.
47 Geo. 3 Sess. 2. c. 10	Export of Salted Beef, etc. (Ireland) Act 1807	Export of salted Beef and Pork (Ireland)	The whole act.
47 Geo. 3 Sess. 2. c. 11	Assessed Taxes, etc. (Ireland) Act 1807	Assessed Taxes, Excise Duties, &c.	The whole act.
47 Geo. 3 Sess. 2. c. 14	Excise and Stamps (Ireland) Act 1807	Excise and Stamp Duties (Ireland)	The whole act.
47 Geo. 3 Sess. 2. c. 16	Importation and Exportation (Ireland) (No. 2) Act 1807	Duties, &c. on Importation and Exportation	The whole act.
47 Geo. 3 Sess. 2. c. 19	Rectifying of Spirits (Ireland) Act 1807	Trade of rectifying Spirits (Ireland)	The whole act.
47 Geo. 3 Sess. 2. c. 20	Commissioners of the Treasury Act 1807	Power to appoint the Chancellor of the Exchequer of Ireland one of the Commissioners of the Treasury in England	The whole act.
47 Geo. 3 Sess. 2. c. 23	Grants for Glebe Houses (Ireland) Act 1807	Grant for Glebe Houses (Ireland)	The whole act.
47 Geo. 3 Sess. 2. c. 30	Excise, etc. (Great Britain) Act 1807	Excise Duties, &c. (Great Britain)	The whole act.
47 Geo. 3 Sess. 2. c. 34	Importation and Exportation Act 1807	Importation and Exportation, Port of Amsterdam, Curaçoa	The whole act.
47 Geo. 3 Sess. 2. c. 44	Sierra Leone Company Act 1807	Sierra Leone Company	Section 4.
47 Geo. 3 Sess. 2. c. 53	Post Office Act 1807	Power for Postmaster-General to open and return Letters directed to Places abroad, but not delivered	The whole act.
47 Geo. 3 Sess. 2. c. 56	Militia (Ireland) (No. 2) Act 1807	Increase of Militia (Ireland)	The whole act.
47 Geo. 3 Sess. 2. c. 63	Excise Duties and Drawbacks Act 1807	Excise Duties and Drawback on Silks	The whole act.
47 Geo. 3 Sess. 2. c. 65	Auction Duty Act 1807	Exemption from Auction Duty of certain Sales by West India Dock Company	The whole act.
48 Geo. 3. c. 2	Duties on Malt, etc. Act 1808	Duties on Malt, Sugar, Tobacco, and Snuff in Great Britain, and on Pensions and Offices in England	The whole act.
48 Geo. 3. c. 9	Customs Act 1808	Abolition of the Office of Surveyor of Subsidies and Petty Customs in the Port of London	The whole act.
48 Geo. 3. c. 30	Trade between Ireland and East Indies Act 1808	Trade between Ireland and the East Indies	The whole act.
48 Geo. 3. c. 31	Counterfeiting of Tokens, etc. Act 1808	Counterfeiting of Bank of Ireland Silver Tokens, and Circulation of same	The whole act.
48 Geo. 3. c. 41	Excise and Stamps Act 1808	Repeal of certain Excise Duties, and Grant of Stamp Duties in lieu thereof, &c. (Ireland)	The whole act.
48 Geo. 3. c. 55	House Tax Act 1808	Assessed Taxes and Stamp Duties on Game Certificates	So much of Section 7 as enacts that "every Receiver General shall have an allowance of Three Halfpence in the Pound on all Monies by him received and paid into the Receipt of Exchequer, or duly accounted for according to the Directions of this Act."
48 Geo. 3. c. 56	Customs (No. 4) Act 1808	Abolition of Fees received by Customs Officers in Irish Ports, and Hours of Attendance and Holidays of said Officers and Officers of Excise	The whole act.
48 Geo. 3. c. 57	Customs (No. 5) Act 1808	Duties of Customs on ready-made Corks	The whole act.
48 Geo. 3. c. 62	Customs and Excise (Ireland) Act 1808	Collection of Revenues of Customs and Excise (Ireland)	The whole act.
48 Geo. 3. c. 64	Militia (Ireland) Act 1808	Militia Enlistment into the Army (Ireland)	The whole act.
48 Geo. 3. c. 68	Bounty on Pilchards Act 1808	Extension of Bounty on Pilchards exported	The whole act.
48 Geo. 3. c. 74	Malt Duties (No. 2) Act 1808	Collection of Malt Duties (Great Britain)	The whole act.
48 Geo. 3. c. 78	Malt, etc., Duties (Ireland) Act 1808	Malt and Spirit Duties (Ireland)	The whole act.
48 Geo. 3. c. 91	Accounts of Expenditure in West Indies Act 1808	Examination of Accounts of Public Expenditure in West Indies	The whole act.
48 Geo. 3. c. 99	Prize Goods Act 1808	Warehousing of Prize Goods liable to Duty, and Reduction of Strength of Spirits condemned as Prize	The whole act.
48 Geo. 3. c. 107	Defence of the Realm Act 1808	Returns of Fines, &c., under Acts relating to the Defence of the Realm	The whole act.
48 Geo. 3. c. 117	Duties upon Silks Act 1808	Duties upon painted or stained Silks	The whole act.
48 Geo. 3. c. 119	Duties on Spirits Act 1808	Regulation of Duties on Spirits imported into Great Britain according to the Strength	The whole act.
48 Geo. 3. c. 120	Duties on Spirits and Coffee Act 1808	Duties on Coffee and warehousing the same, and Lockes	The whole act.
48 Geo. 3. c. 121	Duties on Spirits and Coffee (No. 2) Act 1808	Duties on Coffee taken out of Warehouses for Home Consumption	The whole act.
48 Geo. 3. c. 122	Property for Barrack Service, etc. Act 1808	Vesting in the Commissioners for the Affairs of Barracks, &c., of all Property occupied for the Barrack Service, &c.	The whole act.
48 Geo. 3. c. 129	Larceny Act 1808	Larceny from the Person	The whole act.
48 Geo. 3. c. 132	Reprisals Against Foreign Ships, etc. Act 1808	Stamp Duties on Licences for selling Exciseable Liquors by retail	Duties granted by.
48 Geo. 3. c. 145	Judges' Pensions (Scotland) Act 1808	Annuities to the Judges of the Courts of Session, &c., on Resignation (Scotland)	As to Annuities to the Barons of the Exchequer.
49 Geo. 3. c. 4	Militia (Great Britain) Act 1809	Militia (Great Britain) Enlistment into the Army	The whole act.
49 Geo. 3. c. 5	Militia (Ireland) (No. 1) Act 1809	Militia (Ireland) Enlistment into the Army	The whole act.
49 Geo. 3. c. 9	Importation (No. 2) Act 1809	Importation of Flax Seed into Ireland	The whole act.
49 Geo. 3. c. 24	Distillation of Spirits (No. 2) Act 1809	Excise Duty on Spent Wash re-distilled (Great Britain)	So far as relates to England.
49 Geo. 3. c. 33	Excise (Ireland) Act 1809	Excise Duty on Spirits made from Sugar (Ireland), &c.	The whole act.
49 Geo. 3. c. 34	Prize Act 1809	Registry at Malta of Ships taken as Prize	The whole act.
49 Geo. 3. c. 44	Exemption from Duties Act 1809	Exemption from Home Consumption Duties of Goods brought in as Prize or seized and condemned, restored by Court of Admiralty	The whole act.
49 Geo. 3. c. 56	Militia (Ireland) (No. 2) Act 1809	Completing the Militia (Ireland)	The whole act.
49 Geo. 3. c. 66	Officers of Excise Act 1809	Holidays, &c. in Offices of Excise	The whole act.
49 Geo. 3. c. 68	Bastardy Act 1809	Law of Bastardy (England)	The whole, except s. 3., so far as it relates to Scotland.
49 Geo. 3. c. 69	Indemnity as to Certain Books Act 1809	Indemnity to Persons having Printed Books, &c. without full Description of Printer's Place of Abode	The whole act.
49 Geo. 3. c. 71	National Debt (No. 2) Act 1809	Loans on Annuities	Section 16.
49 Geo. 3. c. 76	Exportation (Ireland) Act 1809	Exportation of Gunpowder, Arms, &c. (Ireland)	The whole act.
49 Geo. 3. c. 81	Excise (No. 4) Act 1809	Laws of Excise relating to Paper, Silks, Salt, &c. (Great Britain)	The whole act.
49 Geo. 3. c. 95	Auditing of Public Accounts Act 1809	Constitution of Board of Commissioners for auditing the Public Accounts	The whole act.
49 Geo. 3. c. 96	Officers of Excise (No. 2) Act 1809	Superannuation Allowance to Officers of Excise	The whole act.
49 Geo. 3. c. 106	Warehoused Goods Act 1809	Warehoused Goods	The whole act.
49 Geo. 3. c. 109	Woollen Manufacture Act 1809	Woollen Manufacture	Sect. 5, in part; namely, from "nor shall any such Persons" to "Parish or Place."
49 Geo. 3. c. 112	Lands for the Defence of the Realm Act 1809	Purchase of Lands for Defence of the Realm	The whole act.
49 Geo. 3. c. 116	Customs and Excise (Ireland) Act 1809	Management of Customs and Excise (Ireland)	The whole act.
49 Geo. 3. c. 117	Excise (Great Britain) Act 1809	Excise Duties on Coffee, Growth of British Dominions in Africa (Great Britain)	The whole act.
49 Geo. 3. c. 121	Bankrupts (England and Ireland) Act 1809	Bankrupts (England and Ireland)	The whole act.
49 Geo. 3. c. 127	Salaries of Chief Baron, etc. Act 1809	Salaries of Chief Baron and other Judges, Chief Justice of Chester, &c.	The whole act.
50 Geo. 3. c. 10	Clandestine Running of Goods, etc. Act 1810	Customs, regulating of Uncustomed Goods, &c.	The whole act.
50 Geo. 3. c. 26	Exportation Act 1810	Duty on Exportation of Foreign plain Linen taken out of Warehouse	The whole act.
50 Geo. 3. c. 34	Exportation (No. 2) Act 1810	Exportation of British and Irish made Silk from one Part of the Kingdom to the other	The whole act.
50 Geo. 3. c. 38	Bonded Warehouses (Ireland) Act 1810	Bonded Warehouses (Ireland)	The whole act.
50 Geo. 3. c. 44	Excise Officers (No. 7) Act 1810	Excise Officers, Superannuation Allowance (Scotland)	The whole act.
50 Geo. 3. c. 47	Insolvent Debtors (Ireland) Act 1810	Relief and Maintenance of Insolvent Debtors (Ireland)	The whole act.
50 Geo. 3. c. 51	Bastards Act 1810	Punishment of Women delivered of Bastards	The whole act.
50 Geo. 3. c. 58	Land Tax Redemption Act 1810	Redemption and Sale of Land Tax	Section 4.
50 Geo. 3. c. 60	Exportation (No. 3) Act 1810	Exportation from Bristol to Newfoundland of Foreign Salt, Duty free, Shipping Salt in certain Cases to North America	The whole act.
50 Geo. 3. c. 71	Charges of Loan, etc., of Present Session Act 1810	Provision for Charges of the Loan, &c. of the present Session	The whole act.
50 Geo. 3. c. 73	Baking Trade Act 1810	Regulation of Baking Trade beyond London, &c.	The whole act.
50 Geo. 3. c. 75	Window Duty (Ireland) Act 1810	Additional Window Duty (Ireland)	The whole act.
50 Geo. 3. c. 76	Stamps (Ireland) Act 1810	Stamp Duties (Ireland)	The whole act.
50 Geo. 3. c. 77	Customs Act 1810	Additional Customs Duties on certain Kinds of Wood	The whole act.
51 Geo. 3. c. 20	Militia Act 1811	Enlistment of a Proportion of the Militia into the Regular Forces	The whole act.
51 Geo. 3. c. 23	Slave Trade Felony Act 1811	Abolition of Slave Trade	The whole act.
51 Geo. 3. c. 30	Militia (Ireland) Act 1811	Militia Enlistment into the Army (Ireland)	The whole act.
51 Geo. 3. c. 32	Excise Act 1811	Storage of Exciseable Goods on board Vessels in the Port of Bristol	The whole act.
51 Geo. 3. c. 34	Southern Whale Fishery Act 1811	Bounties to Ships employed in Southern Whale Fishery	The whole, except Section 6.
51 Geo. 3. c. 47	Commercial Treaty with Portugal Act 1811	Treaty of Commerce with Portugal	The whole, except Section 9.
51 Geo. 3. c. 55	Customs Act 1811	Abolition of Superannuation Fund in the Customs Department	The whole act.
51 Geo. 3. c. 56	Duties on Tobacco Act 1811	Additional Duties on Tobacco manufactured in Ireland	The whole act.
51 Geo. 3. c. 57	Exportation (No. 2) Act 1811	Exportation of salted Beef and Pork from Ireland	The whole act.
51 Geo. 3. c. 59	Duties on Spirits Act 1811	Additional Duties on Wash or other Liquors used in the Distillation of Spirits and on Foreign Spirits	The whole act.
51 Geo. 3. c. 61	Charge of Loan Act 1811	Provision for defraying increased Charge occasioned by Loan	The whole act.
51 Geo. 3. c. 67	Customs Duties Act 1811	Duties on Hides in the Hairs	The whole act.
51 Geo. 3. c. 68	Customs Duties (No. 2) Act 1811	Additional Duty on Verdigris	The whole act.
51 Geo. 3. c. 72	Assessed Taxes Act 1811	Exemptions from Duties of Assessed Taxes on Servants, Horses, Carriages, and Dogs kept in Great Britain and Ireland	The whole act.
51 Geo. 3. c. 74	Prize Goods Act 1811	Sale of Warehoused Prize Goods	The whole act.
51 Geo. 3. c. 82	Rock Salt Act 1811	Regulation respecting Rock Salt delivered to Refineries, &c.	The whole act.
51 Geo. 3. c. 89	Salary of Lord Lieutenant (Ireland) Act 1811	Increase of Salary of the Lord Lieutenant of Ireland.	The whole act.
51 Geo. 3. c. 93	Duties on Norway Timber Act 1811	Duties on Norway Fir Timber	The whole act.
51 Geo. 3. c. 95	Excise, etc. Act 1811	Auction Duty; Roasting Coffee; Watermark on Paper intended for Exportation	Section 1.
51 Geo. 3. c. 110	Counterfeiting Bank of England Tokens Act 1811	Counterfeiting of Silver Tokens issued by the Bank of England	The whole act.
52 Geo. 3. c. 30	Warehousing of Spirits (Ireland) Act 1812	Warehousing of Spirits distilled from Corn (Ireland)	The whole act.
52 Geo. 3. c. 34	Debtors Relief Act 1812	Relief of Debtors	The whole act.
52 Geo. 3. c. 36	Duties on Mahogany, etc. Act 1812	Duties on Mahogany, &c.	The whole act.
52 Geo. 3. c. 46	Duties on Spirits (Ireland) Act 1812	Duties upon Spirits, &c. (Ireland)	The whole act.
52 Geo. 3. c. 48	Duties on Spirits (Ireland) (No. 2) Act 1812	Duties on Spirits distilled from Corn in Stills of and under 100 Gallons Content (Ireland)	The whole act.
52 Geo. 3. c. 53	Auction Duty Act 1812	Auction Duty on Sale of Colonial Coffee	The whole act.
52 Geo. 3. c. 60	Customs Act (No. 2) 1812	Payment of Superannuation Allowances in Customs Department (Scotland)	The whole act.
52 Geo. 3. c. 64	Obtaining Bonds, etc., Under False Pretences Act 1812	Obtaining Bonds and other Securities under false Pretences	The whole act.
52 Geo. 3. c. 81	Excise Officers Allowance Act 1812	Superannuation Allowance of Officers of Excise.	The whole act.
52 Geo. 3. c. 82	Transfer of Scotch Excise Charity, etc. Act 1812	Transfer to Consolidated Fund of Scotch Excise Charity and Superannuation Funds, &c.	The whole act.
52 Geo. 3. c. 87	Stamp Duties, etc. (Ireland) Act 1812	Stamp Duties; Duties on Cards and Dice (Ireland).	The whole act.
52 Geo. 3. c. 94	Excise (No. 3) Act 1812	Excise Duties on Glass, Hides, Tobacco and Snuff (Ireland).	The whole act.
52 Geo. 3. c. 96	Application of Bounties on Linen, etc. Act 1812	Application of Amount of Bounties on Linen, &c., or towards defraying Charge of any Loan made in the present Session.	The whole act.
52 Geo. 3. c. 107	Duty on Salt Act 1812	Allowance of Duty on Salt used for making Acid for Bleaching.	The whole act.
52 Geo. 3. c. 117	Customs Act (No. 4) 1812	Customs Duties on certain Woods, and on Pot and Pearl Ashes.	The whole act.
52 Geo. 3. c. 118	Distillation from Corn, etc. Act 1812	Amendment of Act respecting Prohibition of Distillation of Spirits from Corn, &c.	The whole act.
52 Geo. 3. c. 119	Importation (No. 3) Act 1812	Importation of Turkey, &c., in Foreign Ships.	The whole act.
52 Geo. 3. c. 128	Excise (No. 4) Act 1812	Regulations for securing Excise Duties on Malt (Scotland).	The whole act.
52 Geo. 3. c. 135	East India Company (No. 2) Act 1812	Advance to the East India Company for Discharge of Part of the Indian Debt.	The whole act.
52 Geo. 3. c. 139	Duties on Stone Bottles Act 1812	Duties on Stone Bottles.	The whole act.
52 Geo. 3. c. 142	Removal of Goods Act 1812	Removal of Goods from one Bonding Warehouse to another.	The whole act.
52 Geo. 3. c. 153	British White Herring Fishery Act 1812	British White Herring Fishery.	The whole act.
53 Geo. 3. c. 8	Importation and Exportation (No. 3) Act 1812	Duties and Drawbacks on Importation and Exportation of Spanish or Red Wine.	The whole act.
53 Geo. 3. c. 9	Duty on Malt Act 1812	Duties on Malt.	The whole act.
53 Geo. 3. c. 10	Duty on Rice Act 1812	Additional Duty on Rice.	The whole act.
53 Geo. 3. c. 11	Drawback on Chocolate Act 1812	Additional Drawback on Chocolate.	The whole act.
53 Geo. 3. c. 19	Issue, etc., of Gold and Silver Tokens Act 1813	Prevention of Issue and Circulation of Gold or Silver Tokens, other than those of the Banks of England and Ireland.	The whole act.
53 Geo. 3. c. 20	Militia (Great Britain) Act 1813	Militia (Great Britain) Enlistment of a Proportion of the Corps of Miners of Cornwall and Devon into the Regular Forces.	The whole act.
53 Geo. 3. c. 21	Prisoners for Certain Debts, etc. Act 1813	Provision for poor Persons confined for Debt, &c., sued for by Order of Commissioners of Customs and Excise.	The whole act.
53 Geo. 3. c. 22	Salt Duties Act 1813	Sale of Salt seized, Duty free, and Reward to seizing Officer.	The whole act.
53 Geo. 3. c. 30	Exportation Act 1813	Bounty on Exportation of Manufactures of Raw Silk.	The whole act.
53 Geo. 3. c. 33	Customs Act 1813	Additional Excise on Cinnamon.	The whole act.
53 Geo. 3. c. 34	Importation Act 1813	Additional Excise Duties on Importation of Tobacco, Snuff, and French Wines, and Drawbacks.	The whole act.
53 Geo. 3. c. 38	Exportation (No. 4) Act 1813	Exportation of Corn and other Articles to Newfoundland, &c.	The whole act.
53 Geo. 3. c. 52	Distillation, etc., of Spirits (Ireland) Act 1813	Distillation and warehousing of Spirits made from Sugar (Ireland).	The whole act.
53 Geo. 3. c. 56	Excise Act 1813	Excise Duties on Malt (Ireland).	The whole act.
53 Geo. 3. c. 57	Excise (No. 2) Act 1813	Excise Duties on Tobacco (Ireland).	The whole act.
53 Geo. 3. c. 59	Duties on Carriages, etc. (Ireland) Act 1813	Duties on Carriages, Horses, Male Servants, and Windows (Ireland).	The whole act.
53 Geo. 3. c. 60	Duties on Hides, etc. (Ireland) Act 1813	Collection of Duties on Hides dressed in Oil, Vellum, and Parchment (Ireland).	The whole act.
53 Geo. 3. c. 62	Duties on Sugar Act 1813	Duties on Sugar for Home Consumption from Martinique, &c.	The whole act.
53 Geo. 3. c. 84	Duties on Cape Wines Act 1813	Duties on Cape Wines.	The whole act.
53 Geo. 3. c. 86	Naval Compensations, etc. Act 1813	Naval Compensations and Pensions	The whole act.
53 Geo. 3. c. 87	Frauds by Boatmen, etc. Act 1813	Apprenticeship of certain Frauds by Boatmen and others, and Adjustment of Salvage.	The whole act.
53 Geo. 3. c. 97	Sale of Muriate of Potash, etc. Act 1813	Sale by Glassmakers of Muriate of Tin for Manufacture of Alum, and Excise Duty thereon.	The whole act.
53 Geo. 3. c. 100	Audit of Accounts Act 1813	Audit of Accounts of Paymaster-General of the Forces, &c.	The whole act.
53 Geo. 3. c. 103	Excise (No. 4) Act 1813	Transfer of Excise Licences to Executors, &c. of licensed Traders.	The whole act.
53 Geo. 3. c. 104	Duties on Sugar (Ireland) Act 1813	Entry into Ireland for Home Consumption of Sugar from Martinique, &c., at reduced Duty.	The whole act.
53 Geo. 3. c. 106	Counterfeiting of Bank of Ireland Tokens Act 1813	Counterfeiting of Tokens of the Bank of Ireland.	The whole act.
53 Geo. 3. c. 112	Slave Trade Act 1813	Prosecutions under Acts relating to the Abolition of the Slave Trade.	The whole act.
53 Geo. 3. c. 114	Issue, etc., of Gold and Silver Tokens (No. 2) Act 1813	Prevention of fraudulent Circulation of Gold and Silver Tokens, except those of Banks of England and Ireland.	The whole act.
53 Geo. 3. c. 116	Price, etc., of Bread Act 1813	Price and Assize of Bread sold out of City of London, and beyond the Bills of Mortality, &c.	The whole act.
53 Geo. 3. c. 120	National Debt of Ireland Reduction Act 1813	Reduction of the National Debt.	The whole act.
53 Geo. 3. c. 124	Salt Duty Act 1813	Use of Salt, Duty free, for curing certain Fish.	The whole act.
53 Geo. 3. c. 128	Roman Catholic Relief Act 1813	Relief of Persons holding certain Civil or Military Offices in Ireland, from Penalties of Popish Recusancy in England, &c.	The whole act.
53 Geo. 3. c. 129	Six Clerks in Chancery (Ireland) Act 1813	Sale of Offices of Six Clerks in Chancery (Ireland).	The whole act.
53 Geo. 3. c. 137	Sale of Spirituous Liquors, etc. (Ireland) Act 1813	Licences for Sale of Spirituous Liquors, &c. (Ireland).	The whole act.
53 Geo. 3. c. 140	Cinque Ports Pilots Act 1813	Cinque Ports Pilots.	The whole act.
53 Geo. 3. c. 145	Distillation of Spirits (Ireland) Act 1813	Distillation of Spirits (Ireland).	The whole act.
53 Geo. 3. c. 147	Duties on Spirits (Great Britain) Act 1813	Excise Duties on Spirits (Great Britain).	The whole act.
53 Geo. 3. c. 148	Distillation of Spirits (Ireland) (No. 2) Act 1813	Illicit Distillation of Spirits (Ireland).	The whole act.
53 Geo. 3. c. 156	Charge of Certain Annuities Act 1813	Provision for Payment of the Charge of certain Annuities.	The whole act.
54 Geo. 3. c. 1	Militia (No. 2) Act 1813	British and Irish Militias, Service out of the United Kingdom.	The whole act.
54 Geo. 3. c. 11	Militia (No. 4) Act 1813	Provision for Service of Militia (Great Britain and Ireland).	The whole act.
54 Geo. 3. c. 13	Aid to Russia, etc. Act 1813	Augmentation of 60th Regiment by Enlistment of Foreigners.	The whole act.
54 Geo. 3. c. 17	City of London Militia Act 1813	City of London Militia, Service out of the United Kingdom.	The whole act.
54 Geo. 3. c. 20	Militia (No. 5) Act 1813	Amendment of Acts relating to Service of the British and Irish Militias out of the United Kingdom.	The whole act.
54 Geo. 3. c. 21	Duty on Salt Act 1813	Duty on Scotch Salt brought to England.	The whole act.
54 Geo. 3. c. 32	Illicit Distillation (Ireland) Act 1813	Illicit Distillation of Spirits (Ireland).	The whole act.
54 Geo. 3. c. 36	Customs, etc. Act 1813	Customs Duties on Goods imported from East Indies into Great Britain, East India Company's Accounts, &c.	The whole act.
54 Geo. 3. c. 42	Destruction of Stocking Frames, etc. Act 1813	Punishment for Destruction of Stocking or Lace Frames, &c.	The whole act. (Note: This act was already repealed by the Destroying Stocking Frames, etc. Act 1817 (57 Geo. 3. c. 126).)
54 Geo. 3. c. 50	Customs Act 1814	Customs Duties on Sugar.	The whole act.
54 Geo. 3. c. 59	Slave Trade Act 1814	Slave Trade Suppression, Registration of Captured Ships.	The whole act.
54 Geo. 3. c. 64	Customs (No. 2) Act 1814	War Duties of Customs Continuance.	The whole act.
54 Geo. 3. c. 65	Customs (No. 3) Act 1814	Customs Duties on Importation of French Goods, &c.	The whole act.
54 Geo. 3. c. 66	Customs (No. 4) Act 1814	Repeal of Customs Duties on Teak or other Wood for Ship-building, imported from East Indies.	The whole act.
54 Geo. 3. c. 69	Customs (No. 5) Act 1814	Repeal of all Customs Duties, Bounties, and Restrictions on the Exportation of Corn from the United Kingdom.	The whole act.
54 Geo. 3. c. 77	Customs (No. 6) Act 1814	Customs Regulations for securing Duties on Cape Wines.	The whole act.
54 Geo. 3. c. 88	Duties on Spirits (Ireland) Act 1814	Collection of Excise Duties on Spirits (Ireland).	The whole act.
54 Geo. 3. c. 97	Duties on Glass (Great Britain) Act 1814	Excise Duties on Glass (Great Britain).	The whole act.
54 Geo. 3. c. 120	Customs and Excise Act 1814	Management of Customs and Excise (Ireland).	The whole act.
54 Geo. 3. c. 121	Customs and Excise (No. 2) Act 1814	Excise Duties on Foreign Wine, Spirits, and other Liquors.	The whole act.
54 Geo. 3. c. 124	Importation (No. 2) Act 1814	Importation of Tobacco and Snuff into Plymouth.	The whole act.
54 Geo. 3. c. 127	Exportation (No. 3) Act 1814	Exportation from Scotland and Ireland of Linen Cloth without Stamps.	So far as relates to Scotland.
54 Geo. 3. c. 142	Exportation (No. 4) Act 1814	Importation from British America, &c., Duty free.	The whole act.
54 Geo. 3. c. 174	Post Horse Duties, etc. (Great Britain) Act 1814	Farming of the Post Horse Duties, and Measurement of Roads (Great Britain).	The whole act.
55 Geo. 3. c. 14	Customs (No. 9) Act 1814	Customs Duties on Wood (Ireland).	The whole act.
55 Geo. 3. c. 22	Customs Act 1815	Customs Duties on Tobacco.	The whole act.
55 Geo. 3. c. 23	Customs Act (No. 2) 1815	Customs Duties on Citrat of Lime.	The whole act.
55 Geo. 3. c. 29	Trade of Malta Act 1815	Trade of Malta.	The whole act.
55 Geo. 3. c. 35	Excise (No. 3) Act 1815	Additional Excise Duty on Tobacco (Ireland).	The whole act.
55 Geo. 3. c. 36	Customs Act (No. 5) 1815	Customs Duty on Tobacco (Ireland).	The whole act.
55 Geo. 3. c. 37	Exportation and Importation (No. 2) Act 1815	Exportation or Importation of Sugar, Coffee, &c. (Ireland).	The whole act.
55 Geo. 3. c. 55	Land Revenue of the Crown Act 1815	Land Revenues of the Crown.	The whole act.
55 Geo. 3. c. 57	South Sea Company Act 1815	Repeal of South Sea Company's exclusive Privileges of Trade, and Indemnity to the Company for the Loss.	The whole act.
55 Geo. 3. c. 62	Excise (No. 4) Act 1815	Excise Duties on Malt (Ireland).	The whole act.
55 Geo. 3. c. 66	Excise and Customs Act 1815	Excise Duties on Salt, Drawback on Foreign Brimstone, &c.	The whole act.
55 Geo. 3. c. 95	Customs Act (No. 8) 1815	Customs Duties on Vegetable Substances.	The whole act.
55 Geo. 3. c. 99	Duties on Malt (Ireland) Act 1815	Excise Duties on Malt (Ireland).	The whole act.
55 Geo. 3. c. 105	Duties on Hides, etc. Act 1815	Excise Duties on Hides and Skins tanned in Ireland.	The whole act.
55 Geo. 3. c. 110	Duties on Sweets, etc. (Ireland) Act 1815	Excise Duties on Sweets or Made Wines (Ireland).	The whole act.
55 Geo. 3. c. 114	Supreme Court (Ireland) (Master of the Rolls) Act 1815	Salaries, &c., of Master of the Rolls; Offices of Six Clerks in Chancery (Ireland).	Sections 3, 4, 5, 6.
55 Geo. 3. c. 129	Drawbacks, etc., on Tobacco, etc. Act 1815	Drawbacks and countervailing Duties on Tobacco; Exportation of Wine.	The whole act.
55 Geo. 3. c. 135	Customs Act (No. 9) 1815	Customs Regulations as to Newfoundland Blubber and Train Oil.	The whole act.
55 Geo. 3. c. 141	South Sea Company's Privileges Act 1815	Amendment of the Act for Repeal of South Sea Company's exclusive Trade Privileges.	The whole act.
55 Geo. 3. c. 163	Customs Act (No. 10) 1815	Customs Regulations; Licences to open Roads.	The whole act.
55 Geo. 3. c. 168	Militia (No. 2) Act 1815	Amendment of Laws relating to Militia of Great Britain and Ireland.	So far as relates to the Militia of Scotland.
55 Geo. 3. c. 169	National Debt (No. 4) Act 1815	Provision for Charge of Addition to Funded Debt.	The whole act.
55 Geo. 3. c. 172	Support of Captured Slaves Act 1815	Support of captured Slaves during the Period of Adjudication.	The whole act.
55 Geo. 3. c. 177	Frauds in Manufacture of Sweets Act 1815	Prevention of Frauds in Manufacture of Sweets.	The whole act.
55 Geo. 3. c. 179	Salt Duty Act 1815	Use of Salt, Duty free, for curing Fish, &c.	The whole act.
55 Geo. 3. c. 181	Customs Act (No. 12) 1815	Customs Duty on certain Seeds imported.	The whole act.
56 Geo. 3. c. 25	Importation (No. 2) Act 1816	Duty on Importation of Butter	The whole act.
56 Geo. 3. c. 26	Importation (No. 3) Act 1816	Duty on Importation of Cheese	The whole act.
56 Geo. 3. c. 29	Customs, etc. Act 1816	Perpetuation of certain War Duties of Customs, &c.	The whole act.
56 Geo. 3. c. 34	Duty on Corks Act 1816	Additional Duty on Corks	The whole act.
56 Geo. 3. c. 44	Duties, etc., on Soap Act 1816	Excise Duties, &c., on Soap	The whole act.
56 Geo. 3. c. 59	Duty on Malt (Ireland) Act 1816	Excise Duty on Malt (Ireland)	The whole act.
56 Geo. 3. c. 64	Militia Act 1816	Amendment of Acts relating to the Militia of Great Britain.	So far as relates to the Militia of Scotland.
56 Geo. 3. c. 70	National Debt Redemption (Ireland) Act 1816	Redemption of National Debt (Ireland).	The whole act.
56 Geo. 3. c. 73	Stealing Property from Mines Act 1816	Removal of Difficulties in Prosecution of Offenders stealing Property from Mines.	The whole act.
56 Geo. 3. c. 75	Duties on Rape Seed, etc. Act 1816	Customs Duties on Rape Seed, &c.	The whole act.
56 Geo. 3. c. 77	Customs (No. 2) Act 1816	Repeal of certain Duties granted by the Act for repealing the exclusive Privileges of the South Sea Company.	The whole act.
56 Geo. 3. c. 79	Duties on Rape Seed, etc. (No. 2) Act 1816	Customs Duties on Rape Seed Cakes, Bones, &c.	The whole act.
56 Geo. 3. c. 85	Customs and Excise Act 1816	Management of Customs and Excise (Ireland).	The whole act.
56 Geo. 3. c. 86	Aliens Act 1816	Aliens	The whole act.
56 Geo. 3. c. 94	Salt Duty Act 1816	Use of crushed Rock Salt, Duty free, in Manufacture of Muriatic Acid.	The whole act.
56 Geo. 3. c. 113	Beer, etc., Licences (Great Britain) Act 1816	Beer, &c., Licences (Great Britain).	The whole act.
56 Geo. 3. c. 118	Duty on Oil, etc. Act 1816	Duty on Oil and Blubber from the North American Colonies.	The whole act.
56 Geo. 3. c. 119	Mutiny Acts Amendment Act 1816	Mutiny Act Amendment	The whole act.
56 Geo. 3. c. 127	Exportation (No. 4) Act 1816	Duty on Exportation of small Coals from Great Britain.	The whole act.
56 Geo. 3. c. 133	National Debt Act 1816	Provision for the annual Charge of the Loans of this Session.	The whole act.
56 Geo. 3. c. 135	Crinan Canal (Scotland) Act 1816	Crinan Canal (Scotland)	The whole act.
56 Geo. 3. c. 137	Bankrupts (England) Act 1816	Bankrupts	The whole act.
57 Geo. 3. c. 18	Court of Exchequer (England) Act 1817	Business of the Court of Exchequer (England), Equity Side.	The whole act.
57 Geo. 3. c. 30	Navy, etc. Bills Act 1817	Interest on and Period of Payments of Navy, Victualling, and Transport Bills.	The whole act.
57 Geo. 3. c. 32	Duties on Stone Bottles Act 1817	Excise Duties on Stone Bottles	The whole act.
57 Geo. 3. c. 49	Excise Act 1817	Laws of Excise respecting Salt and Rock Salt.	The whole act.
57 Geo. 3. c. 51	Marriages, Newfoundland Act 1817	Celebration of Marriages, Newfoundland.	The whole act.
57 Geo. 3. c. 61	Abolition of Certain Officers of Royal Forests Act 1817	Abolition of Offices of Wardens, Chief Justices, and Justices in Eyre of the Royal Forests, &c. North and South of the Trent.	The whole act.
57 Geo. 3. c. 63	Offices of Clerks of the Signet, etc. Act 1817	Regulation of Offices of Clerks of the Signet and Privy Seal.	The whole act.
57 Geo. 3. c. 76	Drawback on Paper Act 1817	Drawback on Paper allowed to the Universities in Scotland.	The whole act.
57 Geo. 3. c. 79	Transfer of Stocks Act 1817	Transfer from Funds in Great Britain to Funds in Ireland.	The whole act.
57 Geo. 3. c. 86	Importation (No. 3) Act 1817	Importation of Foreign Cambrics and Lawns into Ireland.	The whole act.
57 Geo. 3. c. 88	Fullers Earth, etc. Act 1817	Fullers Earth, &c.carried Coastwise.	The whole act.
57 Geo. 3. c. 96	Duties on Coals, etc. Act 1817	Duties on Coal, &c. removed Coastwise (Wales).	The whole act.
57 Geo. 3. c. 119	Duty on Stone Bottles Act 1817	Exemption of Stone Blacking Bottles from Duty.	The whole act.
57 Geo. 3. c. 123	Excise (No. 2) Act 1817	Excise Duty on Spirits made from Corn in England, &c.	The whole act.
57 Geo. 3. c. 128	Window Duties (Scotland) Act 1817	Window Duties (Scotland)	The whole act.
58 Geo. 3. c. 8	Kilmainham Hospital Act 1818	Kilmainham Hospital, Suspension of Pensions for Misconduct.	The whole act.
58 Geo. 3. c. 13	Retailing of Spirits (Scotland) Act 1818	Duties on Licences for retailing Aqua Vitæ in Scotland.	The whole act.
58 Geo. 3. c. 18	Duties on Corks Act 1818	Customs Duties on Corks ready made imported into Ireland.	The whole act.
58 Geo. 3. c. 21	Duties on Glass Act 1818	Excise Duties on Glass	The whole act.
58 Geo. 3. c. 33	Glass Duties Act 1818	Allowance for broken Plate Glass, &c.	The whole act.
58 Geo. 3. c. 36	Slave Trade Act 1818	Execution of Treaty with Spain, for preventing Traffic in Slaves.	The whole act.
58 Geo. 3. c. 41	Duties on Paper (Ireland) Act 1818	Collection of Duties on Paper (Ireland), and Drawback on Paper used at Press of Trinity College, Dublin.	The whole act.
58 Geo. 3. c. 49	Slave Trade (No. 2) Act 1818	Abolition of Slave Trade	The whole act.
58 Geo. 3. c. 56	Exportation (No. 2) Act 1818	Bounty on Exportation of Silk Manufactures.	The whole act.
58 Geo. 3. c. 65	Duties on Vinegar Act 1818	Excise Duties on Vinegar or Acetous Acid.	The whole act.
58 Geo. 3. c. 75	Preservation of Game Act 1818	Preservation of Graves	The whole act.
58 Geo. 3. c. 77	Duties on Salt Act 1818	Excise Duties on Rock Salt	The whole act.
58 Geo. 3. c. 79	Auction Duties (Ireland) Act 1818	Auction Duties (Ireland)	The whole act.
58 Geo. 3. c. 80	Transfer of Stocks Act 1818	Transfer from Stocks in Great Britain to Stocks in Ireland.	The whole act.
58 Geo. 3. c. 85	Slave Trade (No. 3) Act 1818	Execution of Convention with Portugal for preventing Traffic in Slaves.	The whole act.
58 Geo. 3. c. 89	Attendance of Magistrates on Board Vessels Act 1818	Attendance of Magistrates on board outward bound Passenger Vessels.	The whole act.
58 Geo. 3. c. 93	Relief to Holders of Certain Securities Act 1818	Relief to bonâ fide Holders for Value of negotiable Securities without Notice of usurious Consideration.	The whole act.
58 Geo. 3. c. 94	Sea Fisheries (Ireland) Act 1818	Sea Fisheries (Ireland)	The whole act.
58 Geo. 3. c. 98	Slave Trade (No. 4) Act 1818	Abolition of the Slave Trade.	The whole act.
59 Geo. 3. c. 17	Slave Trade Suppression, Portugal Act 1819	Execution of Convention with Portugal for preventing Traffic in Slaves.	The whole act.
59 Geo. 3. c. 28	Courts of Quarter Sessions Act 1819	Division of Courts of Quarter Sessions.	The whole act.
59 Geo. 3. c. 29	Duties on Mineral Alkali Act 1819	Customs Duties on Mineral Alkali	The whole act.
59 Geo. 3. c. 36	Bread Act 1819	Making and Sale of Bread out of City of London and beyond Bills of Mortality, &c.	The whole act.
59 Geo. 3. c. 57	Excise (No. 2) Act 1819	Excise Duties, Salt (Great Britain)	The whole act.
59 Geo. 3. c. 64	Warden of the Fleet Prison Act 1819	Proceedings against Warden of the Fleet in Vacation.	The whole act.
59 Geo. 3. c. 71	National Debt (No. 2) Act 1819	Loan from Commissioners for Reduction of National Debt.	The whole act.
59 Geo. 3. c. 91	Charity Estates (England) Act 1819	Application of Court of Chancery regarding Charity Estates (England).	The whole act.
59 Geo. 3. c. 97	Slave Trade Act 1819	Trial of Offences committed in Africa against the Laws for Abolition of the Slave Trade.	The whole act.
59 Geo. 3. c. 103	Laying of Accounts Before Parliament Act 1819	Provisions respecting Accounts to be laid before Parliament.	The whole act.
59 Geo. 3. c. 105	Excise (No. 5) Act 1819	Excise Duties on Spirits, certain Licences, Leather and Glass of Carriages, &c. (Great Britain and Ireland).	The whole act.
59 Geo. 3. c. 113	Southern Whale Fishery Act 1819	Premiums to Ships employed in Southern Whale Fishery.	The whole act.
59 Geo. 3. c. 120	Registry, etc., of Colonial Slaves Act 1819	Registry of Colonial Slaves in Great Britain, and Removal of Slaves from Colonies.	The whole act.
59 Geo. 3. c. 124	Passenger Vessels Act 1819	Passenger Vessels to Colonies, &c.	The whole act.
1 Geo. 4. c. 9	Vessels Built at Malta etc. Act 1820	Grant of Privileges of British Ships to Vessels built at Malta, &c.	The whole act.
1 Geo. 4. c. 22	National Debt Act 1820	Loan from Commissioners for Reduction of National Debt.	The whole act.
1 Geo. 4. c. 26	Coasting Trade (Ireland) Act 1820	Coasting Trade (Ireland)	The whole act.
1 Geo. 4. c. 35	Court of Exchequer (England) etc. Act 1820	Court of Exchequer (England) Suitors' Money, Appointment of Accountant-General, &c.	The whole act.
1 Geo. 4. c. 37	Appointment of Special Constables Act 1820	Appointment of Special Constables by Magistrates.	The whole act.
1 Geo. 4. c. 40	Compensation for Tithes (Ireland) Act 1820	Compensation for Tithes withheld (Ireland).	The whole act.
1 Geo. 4. c. 72	Lotteries Act 1820	Lotteries	The whole act.
1 Geo. 4. c. 75	Duty on Tobacco Act 1820	Excise Duty on Tobacco	The whole act.
1 Geo. 4. c. 78	Duties on Spirit Licences etc. (Ireland) Act 1820	Duties on Spirit Licences, &c. (Ireland).	The whole act.
1 Geo. 4. c. 87	Recovery of Possession by Landlords Act 1820	Recovery of Possession by Landlords.	The whole act.
1 Geo. 4. c. 99	East India Company Act 1820	Maintenance of a Volunteer Infantry Corps by the East India Company.	The whole act.
1 Geo. 4. c. 102	Indictments Act 1820	Indictments in respect of Property belonging to Partners.	The whole act.
1 Geo. 4. c. 115	Capital Punishment Act 1820	Abolition of Capital Punishment for certain Offences, and Substitution of other Punishment.	The whole act.
1 Geo. 4. c. 118	Duty on Malt (Scotland) Act 1820	Excise Duty on Malt (Scotland)	The whole act.
1 & 2 Geo. 4. c. 14	Importation Act 1821	Free Importation of Cochineal and Indigo.	The whole act.
1 & 2 Geo. 4. c. 22	Beer Duties Act 1821	Ale and Beer Duties (Great Britain)	So much as relates to increases in Stock.
1 & 2 Geo. 4. c. 29	Duty on Irish Starch Act 1821	Allowances in certain Cases in respect of Duty on Irish Starch imported into Great Britain.	The whole act.
1 & 2 Geo. 4. c. 47	Disfranchisement of Grampound (No. 2) Act 1821	Disfranchisement of Borough of Grampound, and additional Knights of the Shire for Yorkshire.	Sections 2 and 3.
1 & 2 Geo. 4. c. 50	Making, etc., of Bread Act 1821	Making and Sale of Bread out of City of London and beyond Bills of Mortality, &c.	The whole act.
1 & 2 Geo. 4. c. 60	South Sea Trade Act 1821	Exemption of Ships in Ballast in the South Sea Trade from certain Tonnage Duties.	The whole act.
1 & 2 Geo. 4. c. 70	National Debt Act 1821	Loan from Commissioners for Reduction of National Debt.	The whole act.
1 & 2 Geo. 4. c. 75	Frauds by Boatmen, etc. Act 1821	Frauds by Boatmen and others, and Adjustment of Salvage in England.	The whole act.
1 & 2 Geo. 4. c. 91	Silk, etc., Bounties Act 1821	Silk and Mohair, &c. Bounties	The whole act.
1 & 2 Geo. 4. c. 96	British Spirits Duty Act 1821	British Spirits Duty (Lisburne, Ireland).	The whole act.
1 & 2 Geo. 4. c. 99	Proceeds of Captured Slavers Act 1821	Slave Trade	The whole act.
1 & 2 Geo. 4. c. 102	Exportation, etc. Act 1821	Drawback on Acetous Acid exported, and Exemption of Drainage Tiles from Duty.	The whole act.
1 & 2 Geo. 4. c. 105	Excise Act 1821	Amendment of Laws of Excise as to warehoused Goods.	The whole act.
1 & 2 Geo. 4. c. 110	Horse Duties Act 1821	Horse Duties	The whole act.
1 & 2 Geo. 4. c. 120	Lotteries Act 1821	Lotteries	The whole act.
3 Geo. 4. c. 25	Starch and Soap Duties Allowances Act 1822	Starch and Soap Duties Allowances	The whole act.
3 Geo. 4. c. 32	Duties on Plain Silk Net or Tulle Act 1822	Duties on plain Silk Net or Tulle	The whole act.
3 Geo. 4. c. 38	Punishment for Manslaughter, etc. Act 1822	Punishment for Manslaughter and for Robbery by Servants, and of Accessories before the Fact to certain Felonies.	The whole act.
3 Geo. 4. c. 47	Rate of Interest Act 1822	Rate of Interest on Securities made in Great Britain on Lands in Ireland or the Colonies.	The whole act.
3 Geo. 4. c. 73	National Debt (No. 5) Act 1822	Loan from Commissioners for Reduction of National Debt.	The whole act.
3 Geo. 4. c. 74	Bankrupts Act 1822	Bankrupts under joint Commissions	The whole act.
3 Geo. 4. c. 101	Lotteries Act 1822	Lotteries	The whole act.
3 Geo. 4. c. 109	Duties, etc., on Barilla Act 1822	Duties and Drawbacks on Barilla	The whole act.
3 Geo. 4. c. 125	Leases of Tithes (Ireland) Act 1822	Leases of Tithes to Ecclesiastical Persons (Ireland).	The whole act.
4 Geo. 4. c. 23	Customs and Excise Act 1823	Consolidation of Boards of Customs, and of Boards of Excise of Great Britain and Ireland.	The whole act.
4 Geo. 4. c. 45	Assessed Taxes Act 1823	Assessed Taxes Composition	The whole act.
4 Geo. 4. c. 70	Court of Exchequer (Ireland) Act 1823	Court of Exchequer, Equity Side (Ireland).	The whole act.
4 Geo. 4. c. 77	Importation, etc., in Foreign Vessels Act 1823	Duties on Goods in Foreign Vessels, &c.	The whole, except Sections 5 and 6.
4 Geo. 4. c. 78	Stamp Duties (Court of Chancery (Ireland)) Act 1823	Stamp Duty on Proceedings in Equity (Ireland).	So far as relates to the Equity Side of the Court of Exchequer.
4 Geo. 4. c. 89	Law Costs (Ireland) Act 1823	Limitation of Expenses of certain Law Proceedings (Ireland).	Section 3.
5 Geo. 4. c. 4	Law Proceedings (Ireland) Act 1824	Law Proceedings (Ireland)-	The whole act.
5 Geo. 4. c. 8	Church Lands Act 1824	Church Lands (Ireland)	The whole act.
5 Geo. 4. c. 16	Court of Exchequer (Ireland) Act 1824	Court of Exchequer, Equity Side (Ireland).	The whole act.
5 Geo. 4. c. 17	Slave Trade (No. 1) Act 1824	Slave Trade Suppression -	The whole act.
5 Geo. 4. c. 26	Barrack Property Act 1824	Barrack Property -	The whole act.
5 Geo. 4. c. 50	Price of Bread Act 1824	Price of Bread	The whole act.
5 Geo. 4. c. 54	Licenses to Brew and Sell Beer, etc. Act 1824	Beer and Spirit Licences -	Duties granted by.
5 Geo. 4. c. 70	Customs Act 1824	Substitution of Flour for Foreign Wheat in Warehouses.	The whole act.
5 Geo. 4. c. 75	Excise and Customs Act 1824	Excise and Customs Duties	The whole act.
5 Geo. 4. c. 85	Gaols, etc. (England) Act 1824	Gaols and Houses of Correction (England).	So much as requires the making of any Return in the Form of the Schedule (A.) to this Act.
5 Geo. 4. c. 106	Court of Great Sessions (Wales) Act 1824	Courts of Great Sessions in Wales	The whole act.
5 Geo. 4. c. 113	Slave Trade Act 1824	Slave Trade Abolition	From Section 13 to Section 20, both inclusive. Sections 37 and 42. From Section 32 to Section 39, both inclusive, as to Portugal or Spain. Section 57. Section 72.
6 Geo. 4. c. 19	Threatening Letters Act 1825	Threatening Letters as to accusing of infamous Crimes.	The whole act.
6 Geo. 4. c. 56	Forgery Act 1825	Indictments for Forgery on Partnerships.	The whole act.
6 Geo. 4. c. 60	Exchequer, Equity Side (Ireland) Act 1825	Exchequer, Equity Side (Ireland) -	The whole act.
6 Geo. 4. c. 85	Indian Salaries and Pensions Act 1825	Salaries and Pensions of Judges in India, and Bishop of Calcutta; Transportation from St. Helena; Administration of Justice at Singapore, &c.	Section 17.
6 Geo. 4. c. 96	Writs of Error Act 1825	Writs of Error -	The whole act.
7 Geo. 4. c. 17	Administration of Justice, Durham Act 1826	Administration of Justice, Durham	The whole act.
7 Geo. 4. c. 20	Stamp Duties (Ireland) Act 1826	Stamp Duties in Courts of Law (Ireland).	The whole act.
7 Geo. 4. c. 48	Customs Act 1826	Customs Laws Amendment	The whole, except so much of Section 52 as relates to Excise.
7 Geo. 4. c. 55	Poll at Elections, Yorkshire Act 1826	Poll at Elections of Knights of the Shire for the County of York.	The whole act.
7 & 8 Geo. 4. c. 34	Minister's Money (Ireland) Act 1827	Ministers Money (Ireland) -	The whole act.
7 & 8 Geo. 4. c. 46	General Register House, Edinburgh Act 1827	General Register House, Edinburgh.	The whole act.
7 & 8 Geo. 4. c. 66	Crown Lands Act 1827	Grants of Crown Lands for Public Buildings and Cemeteries.	The whole act.
9 Geo. 4. c. 9	Sessions of the Peace, Westminster Act 1828	Sessions of the Peace, Westminster	The whole act.
9 Geo. 4. c. 59	Parliamentary Elections (England) Act 1828	Mode of taking the Poll at Parliamentary Elections for Boroughs (England).	The whole act.
9 Geo. 4. c. 72	Bombay Marine Act 1828	Bombay Marino	The whole act.
9 Geo. 4. c. 76	Customs Act 1828	Customs	The whole act.
9 Geo. 4. c. 84	Slave Trade Act 1828	Slave Trade Abolition	The whole act.
9 Geo. 4. c. 93	Delivery of Sugar Out of Bond Act 1828	Delivery of Sugar out of Bond to be refined.	The whole act.
10 Geo. 4. c. 16	East India Company Act 1829	Appointment of Writers in the East India Company's Service.	The whole act.
11 Geo. 4 & 1 Will. 4. c. 10	Smugglers' Families Act 1830	Maintenance of Families of Smugglers sentenced to serve in the Navy.	The whole act.
11 Geo. 4 & 1 Will. 4. c. 69	Court of Session Act 1830	Judicial Establishments (Scotland)	Section 42
1 Will. 4. c. 3	Law Terms (Explanation) Act 1830	Administration of Justice, Law Terms, &c.	Sections 5 and 6.
2 & 3 Will. 4. c. 13	Presentments, etc. (Ireland) Act 1832	Presentments, Baronies of St. Sepulchres, Donore (Dublin).	The whole act.
2 & 3 Will. 4. c. 31	Baking Trade (Ireland) Act 1832	Regulation of Baking Trade (Ireland).	The whole act.
2 & 3 Will. 4. c. 41	Recovery of Tithes (Ireland) Act 1832	Recovery of Tithes (Ireland)	The whole act.
2 & 3 Will. 4. c. 49	Clerks of the Signet, etc. Act 1832	Office of Clerks of the Signet and Privy Seal.	The whole act.
3 & 4 Will. 4. c. 10	Customs Act 1833	Cotton Wool Customs Duty	The whole act.
3 & 4 Will. 4. c. 16	Duties on Soap Act 1833	Excise Duties on Soap	The whole act.
3 & 4 Will. 4. c. 17	Manufacturers of Stone Blue Act 1833	Manufacture of Stone Blue	The whole act.
3 & 4 Will. 4. c. 41	Judicial Committee Act 1833	Judicial Committee of Privy Council.	Sections 22, 25, 26, and 27.
3 & 4 Will. 4. c. 98	Bank of England Act 1833	Bank of England Privileges	Section 7.
4 & 5 Will. 4. c. 32	Tonnage Rates (Port of London) Act 1834	Reduction of Tonnage Rates in the Port of London.	Section 4.
4 & 5 Will. 4. c. 89	Customs Act 1834	Customs	The whole act.
5 & 6 Will. 4. c. 32	Tea Duties Act 1835	Tea Duties	The whole act.
5 & 6 Will. 4. c. 37	Militia Act 1835	Militia Staff Reduction and Ballots Suspension.	The whole act.
5 & 6 Will. 4. c. 40	Duty on Wood Act 1835	Duties on Wood, the Produce of Places in Europe.	The whole act.
6 & 7 Will. 4. c. 25	Postage Act 1836	Postage, Milford and Waterford	The whole act.
6 & 7 Will. 4. c. 26	Sugar Duties Act 1836	Sugar Duties	The whole act.
6 & 7 Will. 4. c. 61	Shipowners' Liability for Losses by Fire Act 1836	Shipowners' Liability for Losses by Fire.	The whole act.
6 & 7 Will. 4. c. 101	Parliamentary Elections Act 1836	Parliamentary Elections; List of Voters; Returning Officers (England).	Section 3.
6 & 7 Will. 4. c. 112	Court of Exchequer, Equity Side Act 1836	Court of Exchequer, Equity Side	The whole act.
7 Will. 4. & 1 Vict. c. 51	Advances for Public Works Act 1837	Loans for Public Works and Fisheries.	Section 17
7 Will. 4. & 1 Vict. c. 70	Civil Service, India Act 1837	Haileybury College, &c.	Sections 1, 2, 3, 7, and so much of Section 5 as relates to Admission to Haileybury College.
7 Will. 4. & 1 Vict. c. 85	Offences against the Person Act 1837	Amendment of Laws relating to Offences against the Person.	Section 11.
1 & 2 Vict. c. 10	Validity of Certain Contracts Act 1838	Leasing Powers of Bishops, and of Chapters in which Spiritual Persons are interested, Validity of Contracts.	The whole act.
1 & 2 Vict. c. 22	Haileybury College Act 1838	Haileybury College, &c.	The whole act.
1 & 2 Vict. c. 54	Chancery Court Act 1838	Investment of Suitors' Money, Court of Chancery and Exchequer.	Sections 3 and 4.
1 & 2 Vict. c. 120	Tin Duties Act 1838	Duchy of Cornwall Tin Duties	Section 8.
2 & 3 Vict. c. 14	Appointments in Cathedral Churches Act 1839	Certain Appointments in Cathedral Churches (England).	The whole act.
3 & 4 Vict. c. 17	Excise Act 1840	Customs, Excise, and Assessed Taxes.	So much as relates to Customs Duties and Drawbacks.
3 & 4 Vict. c. 34	Masters in Chancery Act 1840	Masters in Chancery	The whole act.
3 & 4 Vict. c. 49	Duties on Soap Act 1840	Excise Duties on Soap	The whole act.
4 & 5 Vict. c. 13	Loan to South Australia Act 1841	South Australia, Loan to Colonization Commissioners.	The whole act.
5 & 6 Vict. c. 89	Drainage (Ireland) Act 1842	Drainage, &c. (Ireland)	Section 27.
5 & 6 Vict. c. 110	Coventry Act 1842	Coventry Boundary	Section 9.
6 & 7 Vict. c. 12	Coroners Act 1843	Coroner's Inquests	Section 4.
6 & 7 Vict. c. 29	Duties on Wheat, etc. Act 1843	Duties on Wheat, &c. imported from Canada.	The whole act.
7 & 8 Vict. c. 28	Sugar Duties Act 1844	Sugar Duties	The whole act.
7 & 8 Vict. c. 33	County Rates Act 1844	County Rates and High Constables	So far as relates to County Rates.
8 & 9 Vict. c. 5	Sugar Duties Act 1845	Sugar Duties	The whole act.
8 & 9 Vict. c. 13	Duties on Sugar Act 1845	Excise Duties on Sugar	The whole act.
8 & 9 Vict. c. 48	Bankruptcy Act 1845	Oaths Dispensation, Bankruptcy	The whole act.
9 & 10 Vict. c. 22	Importation Act 1846	Corn Importation	The whole act.
9 & 10 Vict. c. 58	Customs (No. 2) Act 1846	Duties of Customs on Books and Engravings.	The whole act.
9 & 10 Vict. c. 63	Sugar Duties (No. 3) Act 1846	Sugar Duties	The whole act.
9 & 10 Vict. c. 94	Customs (No. 3) Act 1846	Reduction of Duties of Customs by Legislatures of certain British Possessions.	The whole act.
10 & 11 Vict. c. 45	Prisoners Removal (Ireland) Act 1847	Prisoners' Removal in certain Cases (Ireland).	The whole act.
10 & 11 Vict. c. 85	Post Office (Duties) Act 1847	Post Office	Section 11.
12 & 13 Vict. c. 19	Prisoners Removal (Ireland) Act 1849	Removal of Prisoners from Gaols in Cases of Epidemic Diseases.	The whole act.
12 & 13 Vict. c. 70	Summary Convictions (Ireland) Act 1849	Summary Convictions (Ireland)	The whole act.
12 & 13 Vict. c. 93	Metropolitan Sewers Act 1849	Metropolitan Sewers	The whole act.
13 & 14 Vict. c. 14	Distressed Unions Advances (Ireland) Act 1850	Advances to Distressed Unions (Ireland).	The whole act.
13 & 14 Vict. c. 67	Brewers' Licensing Act 1850	Excise on Sugar, and Brewers' and Distillers' Licences.	Section 3.
14 & 15 Vict. c. 89	Metropolitan Interment Act 1851	Metropolitan Interment Act, 1850, Amendment.	The whole act.
15 & 16 Vict. c. 16	Repayment of Advances (Ireland) Act 1852	Repayment of Advances (Ireland) Act Amendment.	The whole act.
16 & 17 Vict. c. 54	Customs Act 1853	Customs Duties	The whole act.
16 & 17 Vict. c. 125	Metropolitan Sewers Act 1853	Metropolitan Sewers Acts Continuance and Amendment.	The whole act.

== Bibliography ==
- A Collection of the Public General Statutes passed in the Twenty-fourth and Twenty-fifth Years of the reign of Her Majesty Queen Victoria, 1861. Queen's Printer. East Harding Street, London. 1861. Page 582 et seq. Digitised copy from Google Books.
- Bill 65. Bills, Public. Session 5 February to 6 August 1861. vol 4.
- The Complete Statutes of England. (Halsbury's Statutes of England). Butterworth & Co (Publishers) Ltd. vol 18. p 972.
- "The Statute Law Revision Act, 1861". Halsbury's Statutes of England. Second Edition. Butterworth & Co (Publishers) Ltd. 1950. vol 24. p 186. See also preliminary note at p 126.
- The Times. 31 July 1861. p 6. col 5. (Cf. Palmer's Index)
- The Times. 3 August 1861. p 6. col 1.
- (1861) 7(2) The Jurist (New Series) 303 (10 August 1861)
- (1861) 7(2) The Jurist (New Series) 403 (26 October 1861)
- "The Statute Law Revision Bill" (1861) 36 The Law Times 201 (23 February 1861)
- "The Statute Law Revision Bill in Committee" (1861) 36 The Law Times 475 (3 August 1861)
- "Current Topics" (1861) 5 The Solicitors' Journal & Reporter 271 (16 February 1861)
- "Mr J S Mill on Statute Reform" (1861) 5 The Solicitors' Journal & Reporter 502 (18 May 1861)
- "Statute Law Revision" (1861) 5 The Solicitors' Journal & Reporter 818
- Reilly and Wood, "Statute Law Revision" (1861) 5 The Solicitors' Journal & Reporter 819
- James Stephen "Statute Law Revision" (1861) 5 The Solicitors' Journal & Reporter 834 (2 November 1861)
- "The Machinery of Legislation" (1862) The Law Magazine and Law Review 41 (May 1862)
