= Continuance of Laws (No. 2) Act 1799 =

Act of the Parliament of Great Britain

- Act of Parliament
- Parliament of Great Britain
- Long title: An act to continue, until the twenty-fourth day of June one thousand eight hundred and four, and amend an act, made in the thirty-fifth year of the reign of his present Majesty, for allowing the importation of rape seed, and other seeds used for extracting oil, whenever the prices of middling British rape seed shall be above a certain limit; and to continue several laws relating to the allowing the importation of seal skins cured with foreign salt, free of duty, until the twenty-fourth day of June one thousand eight hundred and four; to the more effectual encouragement of the manufactures of flax and cotton in Great Britain, until the twenty-fourth day of June one thousand eight hundred and three; and so much of an act, made in the thirty-fifth year of the reign of his present Majesty, for better securing the duties on glass, as was to continue in force for a limited time, until the fifth day of June one thousand eight hundred.
- Citation: 39 Geo. 3. c. 38
- Territorial extent: Great Britain

Dates
- Royal assent: 10 May 1799
- Commencement: 10 May 1799 (Note: The Acts of Parliament (Commencement) Act 1793.)
- Repealed: 6 August 1861
Other legislation
Amends	See § Continued enactments
Repealed by	Statute Law Revision Act 1861
Relates to	See Expiring laws continuance acts

Status: Repealed

Text of statute as originally enacted

The Continuance of Laws (No. 2) Act 1799 (39 Geo. 3. c. 38) was an act of the Parliament of Great Britain that continued various older acts.

== Background ==
In the United Kingdom, acts of Parliament remain in force until expressly repealed. Many acts of parliament, however, contained time-limited sunset clauses, requiring legislation to revive enactments that had expired or to continue enactments that would otherwise expire.

The Select Committee on Temporary Laws, Expired or Expiring reported on 12 May 1796, which inspected and considered all the temporary laws, observed irregularities in the construction of expiring laws continuance acts, made recommendations and emphasised the importance of the Committee for Expired and Expiring Laws.

== Provisions ==
=== Continued enactments ===
Section 1 of the act continued the Importation (No. 4) Act 1795 (35 Geo. 3. c. 117), as continued by the Continuance of Laws Act 1796 (36 Geo. 3. c. 40) and the Continuance of Laws Act 1798 (38 Geo. 3. c. 35) until 1 June 1804.

Section 2 of the act provided that from 1 June 1799, the average price of middling British rape seed at the places of importation would be ascertained in the same manner as provided by the Importation and Exportation (No. 2) Act 1791 (31 Geo. 3. c. 30).

== Subsequent developments ==
The whole act was repealed by section 1 of, and the schedule to, the Statute Law Revision Act 1861 (24 & 25 Vict. c. 101), which came into force on 6 August 1861.
