= Duties on Windows, etc. Act 1802 =

Act of the Parliament of the United Kingdom

- Act of Parliament
- Parliament of the United Kingdom
- Long title: An Act for granting to His Majesty certain additional Duties on Windows or Lights, and on Inhabited Houses; and for consolidating the same with the present Duties thereon.
- Citation: 42 Geo. 3. c. 34
- Territorial extent: England and Wales; Scotland; (Note: Section 1.)

Dates
- Royal assent: 15 April 1802
- Commencement: 5 April 1802 (England); 15 May 1802 (Scotland, the term of Whitsunday)
- Repealed: 6 August 1861
Other legislation
Repealed by	Statute Law Revision Act 1861
Relates to	Inhabited House, etc., Duties Act 1798

Status: Repealed

Text of statute as originally enacted

The Duties on Windows, etc. Act 1802 (42 Geo. 3. c. 34) was an act of the Parliament of the United Kingdom that granted additional duties on windows or lights and on inhabited houses in Great Britain, and consolidated the assessment and collection of those additional duties with the existing duties charged under the Inhabited House, etc., Duties Act 1798 (38 Geo. 3. c. 40).

== Subsequent developments ==
The whole act was repealed by section 1 of, and the schedule to, the Statute Law Revision Act 1861 (24 & 25 Vict. c. 101), which came into force on 6 August 1861. The duties on windows and inhabited houses which it had augmented were themselves discontinued considerably earlier: the window tax was abolished in 1851, when it was replaced by a duty on inhabited houses.
