= Statute Law Revision Act 1871 =

Act of the Parliament of the United Kingdom

Statute Law Revision Act 1871 (Note: Section 2.)
- Act of Parliament
- Parliament of the United Kingdom
- Long title: An Act for further promoting the Revision of the Statute Law by repealing certain Enactments which have ceased to be in force or have become unnecessary.
- Citation: 34 & 35 Vict. c. 116
- Introduced by: William Wood, 1st Baron Hatherley (Lords)
- Territorial extent: United Kingdom

Dates
- Royal assent: 21 August 1871
- Commencement: 21 August 1871 (Note: The Acts of ParliSament (Commencement) Act 1793.)

Other legislation
- Amends: See § Repealed enactments
- Repeals/revokes: See § Repealed enactments
- Amended by: Statute Law Revision Act 1872; Statute Law Revision Act 1894; Statute Law Revision Act 2007
- Relates to: Repeal of Obsolete Statutes Act 1856; See Statute Law Revision Act

Status: Partially repealed

History of passage through Parliament

Records of Parliamentary debate relating to the statute from Hansard

Text of statute as originally enacted

The Statute Law Revision Act 1871 (34 & 35 Vict. c. 116) is an act of the Parliament of the United Kingdom that repealed for the United Kingdom enactments from 1372 to 1800 which had ceased to be in force or had become unnecessary. The act was intended to facilitate the preparation of the revised edition of the statutes, then in progress.

As of 2026, the act remains partly in force in the United Kingdom.

== Background ==
In the United Kingdom, acts of Parliament remain in force until expressly repealed. Blackstone's Commentaries on the Laws of England, published in the late 18th-century, raised questions about the system and structure of the common law and the poor drafting and disorder of the existing statute book.

From 1810 to 1825, The Statutes of the Realm was published, providing the first authoritative collection of acts. The first statute law revision act was not passed until 1856 with the Repeal of Obsolete Statutes Act 1856 (19 & 20 Vict. c. 64). This approach — focusing on removing obsolete laws from the statute book followed by consolidation — was proposed by Peter Locke King MP, who had been highly critical of previous commissions' approaches, expenditures, and lack of results.

Previous statute law revision acts
Year passed	Title	Citation	Effect
1861	Statute Law Revision Act 1861	24 & 25 Vict. c. 101	Repealed or amended over 800 enactments
1863	Statute Law Revision Act 1863	26 & 27 Vict. c. 125	Repealed or amended over 1,600 enactments for England and Wales
1867	Statute Law Revision Act 1867	30 & 31 Vict. c. 59	Repealed or amended over 1,380 enactments
1870	Statute Law Revision Act 1870	33 & 34 Vict. c. 69	Repealed or amended over 250 enactments
1871	Promissory Oaths Act 1871	34 & 35 Vict. c. 48	Repealed or amended almost 200 enactments

== Passage ==
The Statute Law Revision Bill had its first reading in the House of Lords on 6 July 1871, introduced by the Lord Chancellor, William Wood, 1st Baron Hatherley. The bill had its second reading in the House of Lords on 18 July 1871 and was committed to a committee of the whole house. In his speech introducing the bill, the Lord Chancellor, William Wood, 1st Baron Hatherley stated that the bill would repeal almost 1,100 acts and parts of acts, continuing the work of Richard Bethell, 1st Baron Westbury to publish a revised edition of the statutes. The committee met and reported without amendment on 20 July 1871. The bill had its third reading in the House of Lords on 21 July 1871.

The bill had its first reading in the House of Commons on 24 July 1871. The bill had its second reading in the House of Commons on 27 July 1871, and was committed to a committee of the whole house, which met and reported on 16 August 1871, with amendments. The amended bill was considered and had its third reading in the House of Commons on 17 August 1871. The amended bill was considered and agreed to by the House of Lords on 18 August 1871.

The bill was granted royal assent on 21 August 1871.

== Subsequent developments ==
The act was intended, in particular, to facilitate the preparation of a revised edition of the statutes.

The schedule to the act was repealed by section 1 of, and the first schedule to, the Statute Law Revision Act 1894 (57 & 58 Vict. c. 54), which came into force on 25 August 1894.

The enactments which were repealed (whether for the whole or any part of the United Kingdom) by the act were repealed so far as they extended to the Isle of Man by section 1(1) of, and schedule 1 to, the Statute Law Revision (Isle of Man) Act 1991, which came into force on 25 July 1991.

The act was retained for the Republic of Ireland by section 2(2)(a) of, and part 4 of schedule 1 to, the Statute Law Revision Act 2007, which came into force on 8 May 2007.

== Repealed enactments ==
Section 1 of the act repealed 1,067 enactments, listed in the schedule to the act, across six categories: (Note: The Note of the bill, unlike the schedule, gives commentary on each act, noting any earlier repeals and the reason for the new repeal.)

- Expired
- Spent
- Repealed in general terms
- Virtually repealed
- Superseded
- Obsolete

Section 1 of the act included several safeguards to ensure that the repeal does not negatively affect existing rights or ongoing legal matters. Specifically, any legal rights, privileges, or remedies already obtained under the repealed laws, as well as any legal proceedings or principles established by them, remain unaffected. Section 1 of the act also ensured that repealed enactments that have been incorporated into other laws would continue to have legal effect in those contexts. Moreover, the repeal would not revive any former rights, offices, or jurisdictions that had already been abolished.

Citation	Short title	Title	Extent of repeal
46 Edw. 3.	Knights of the Shire Act 1372	N/A	The whole act.
8 & 9 Will. 3. c. 20	Bank of England Act 1696	An Act for making good the deficiencies of several Funds therein mentioned and for enlarging the Capital Stock of the Bank of England and for raising the Publick Creditt.	Sections Sixty-two and Sixty-nine.
9 Will. 3. c. 27	Hawkers Act 1697	An Act for licensing Hawkers and Pedlars for a further Provision of Interest for the Transport Debt for reduceing of Ireland.	The whole act.
9 Will. 3. c. 32	Duties on Marriages etc. Act 1697	An Act for preventing Frauds and Abuses in the charging, collecting, & paying the Duties upon Marriages Births Burials Batchellors and Widowers.	The whole act.
9 Will. 3. c. 44	East India Company Act 1697	An Act for raising a Sum not exceeding Two Millions upon a Fund for Payment of Annuities after the Rate of Eight Pounds per Centum per Annum and for settling the Trade to the East Indies.	Section Thirty-five.
1 Ann. c. 2	Demise of the Crown Act 1702	An Act for explaining a Clause in an Act made at the Parliament begun and holden at Westminster the Two and twentieth of November in the Seventh Year of the Reign of our Sovereign Lord King William the Third intituled An Act for the better Security of His Majesties Royal Person and Government.	Section Six so far as relates to the extension of the Act 7 & 8 Will. 3. c. 27 to Ireland.
4 & 5 Ann. c. 3	Administration of Justice Act 1705	An Act for the Amendment of the Law and the better Advancement of Justice.	Section Twenty.
6 Ann. c. 20	Yorkshire (West Riding) Land Registry Act 1706	An Act for Inrollments of Bargains and Sales within the West Riding of the County of York in the Register Office there lately provided and for making the said Register more effectual.	Section Nine.
9 Ann. c. 11	Post Office (Revenues) Act 1710	An Act for establishing a General Post-Office for all Her Majesties Dominions and for settling a weekly Sum out of the Revenues thereof for the Service of the War and other Her Majesties Occasions.	Except the last two Sections.
13 Ann. c. 20	Repair of Breach in Thames Bank at Dagenham: Coal Duties Act 1713	An Act for the more effectual preventing the Mischiefs of the Navigation of the River of Thames by stopping the Breach in the Levels of Havering and Dagenham in the County of Essex and for ascertaining the Coal Measure.	Sections Thirteen and Fourteen.
5 Geo. 1. c. 4	Religious Worship Act 1718	An Act for strengthening the Protestant Interest in these Kingdoms. Repealed as to all Her Majesty's Dominions.	The whole act.
2 Geo. 2. c. 25	Perjury Act 1728	An Act for the more effectual preventing and further Punishment of Forgery, Perjury and Subornation of Perjury; and to make it Felony to steal Bonds, Notes, or other Securities for Payment of Money.	Section Five.
22 Geo. 2. c. 27	Frauds by Workmen Act 1748	An Act the title of which begins with the words,—An Act for the more effectual preventing of Frauds and Abuses,—and ends with the words,—and for the better Payment of their Wages	Sections Ten and Eleven.
22 Geo. 2. c. 46	Continuance of Laws, etc. Act 1748	An Act the title of which begins with the words,—An Act to continue several Laws for preventing Exactions of the Occupiers of Locks and Wears upon the River Thames, Westward,—and ends with the words,—and for allowing Quakers to make Affirmation in Cases where an Oath is or shall be required.	The whole act.
25 Geo. 2. c. 37	Murder Act 1751	An Act for better preventing the horrid Crime of Murder.	Sections One and Eleven.
5 Geo. 3. c. 49	Bank Notes (Scotland) Act 1765	An Act to prevent the Inconveniences arising from the present Method of issuing Notes and Bills by the Banks, Banking Companies, and Bankers, in that part of Great Britain called Scotland.	Section Eight.
6 Geo. 3. c. 23	Cloth Manufacture, Yorkshire Act 1766	An Act the title of which begins with the words,—An Act to continue and amend an Act made in the last Session,—and ends with the words,—Manufacture at the Foreign Market.	Section Fourteen.
6 Geo. 3. c. 32	Transportation (Scotland) Act 1766	An Act the title of which begins with the words,—An Act to extend an Act made in the Fourth Year of the Reign of King George the First,—and ends with the words,—and for amending and rendering more effectual the Laws for restraining Murther in Scotland Until, in that part of the United Kingdom.	The whole act.
10 Geo. 3. c. 45	Bounty of Exportation Act 1766	An Act for the further spreading of the Contagious Disorder amongst the Horned Cattle in Great Britain.	The whole act.
10 Geo. 3. c. 50	Customs Act 1766	An Act for the further preventing Delays of Justice by reason of Privilege of Parliament.	That part so far as the same extends 12 & 13 Will. 3. c. 3. Scotland.
11 Geo. 3. c. 1	Exportation etc. Act 1771	An Act the title of which begins with the words,—An Act to continue the Prohibition of the Exportation of Corn,—and ends with the words,—to prohibit the Exportation of Malt for a limited Time.	The whole act.
11 Geo. 3. c. 2	Malt Duties Act 1771	An Act for continuing and granting to His Majesty certain Duties upon Malt, Mum, Cyder, and Perry, for the Service of the Year One thousand seven hundred and seventy-one.	The whole act.
11 Geo. 3. c. 3	Supply of Seamen Act 1771	An Act for the better Supply of Mariners and Seamen to serve in His Majesty's Ships of War, and on Board Merchant Ships, and other Trading Ships and Vessels.	The whole act.
11 Geo. 3. c. 4	Crown Lands (Savoy) Act 1771	An Act the title of which begins with the words,—An Act to amend so much of an Act made in the Ninth Year of His present Majesty's Reign,—and ends with the words,—therein mentioned.	The whole act.
11 Geo. 3. c. 5	Land Tax Act 1771	An Act for granting an Aid to His Majesty by a Land Tax, to be raised in Great Britain, for the Service of the Year One thousand seven hundred and seventy-one.	The whole act.
11 Geo. 3. c. 6	Mutiny Act 1771	An Act for punishing Mutiny and Desertion; and for the better Payment of the Army and their Quarters.	The whole act.
11 Geo. 3. c. 7	Marine Mutiny Act 1771	An Act for the Regulation of His Majesty's Marine Forces, while on Shore.	The whole act.
11 Geo. 3. c. 8	Importation Act 1771	An Act the title of which begins with the words,—An Act to continue for a further Time an Act made in the Eighth Year of His present Majesty's Reign,—and ends with the words,—British Dominions in America, for a limited Time.	The whole act.
11 Geo. 3. c. 11	Mutiny in America Act 1771	An Act for further continuing Two Acts made in the Sixth and Ninth Years of His Majesty's Reign, for punishing Mutiny and Desertion, and for the better Payment of the Army and their Quarters, in His Majesty's Dominions in America.	The whole act.
11 Geo. 3. c. 25	Loans or Exchequer Bills Act 1771	An Act for raising a certain Sum of Money, by Loans or Exchequer Bills, for the Service of the Year One thousand seven hundred and seventy-one.	The whole act.
11 Geo. 3. c. 37	Exportation Act 1771	An Act to prohibit the Exportation of Live Cattle, and other Flesh Provisions, from Great Britain, for a limited Time.	The whole act.
11 Geo. 3. c. 39	Exportation (No. 2) Act 1771	An Act to amend an Act made in the last Session of Parliament, intituled An Act for extending like Liberty in the Exportation of Rice from East and West Florida to the Southward of Cape Finisterre in Europe, as is granted by former Acts of Parliament to Carolina and Georgia.	The whole act.
11 Geo. 3. c. 47	Lottery Act 1771	An Act for granting to His Majesty a certain Sum of Money, to be raised by a Lottery.	The whole act.
11 Geo. 3. c. 48	Supply, etc. Act 1771	An Act the title of which begins with the words,—An Act for granting to His Majesty a certain Sum of Money out of the Sinking Fund,—and ends with the words,—the last Year's Fishery.	The whole act.
11 Geo. 3. c. 49	Importation (No. 3) Act 1771	An Act the title of which begins with the words,—An Act to continue for a further Time, an Act passed in the Sixth Year of His present Majesty's Reign,—and ends with the words,—Silk Manufactures.	The whole act.
11 Geo. 3. c. 50	Importation (No. 4) Act 1771	An Act for granting a Bounty upon the Importation of White Oak Staves, and Heading, from the British Colonies or Plantations in America.	The whole act.
11 Geo. 3. c. 51	Continuance of Certain Laws, etc. Act 1771	An Act the title of which begins with the words,—An Act for continuing certain Laws for the better Regulation of Lastage and Ballastage in the River Thames,—and ends with the words,—from the Port of Kirkwall, in the Islands of Orkney.	The whole act.
11 Geo. 3. c. 52	Isle of Man Harbours Act 1771	An Act for repealing, amending, and supporting several Laws made in this Kingdom for punishing Desertion.	Sections One to Three, Six, Seven, Section Eight from "and every person appointed" to end of that Section, and Sections Nine, Ten, and Thirteen. Repealed as to all Her Majesty's Dominions.
12 Geo. 3. c. 1	Exportations and Importation Act 1772	An Act the title of which begins with the words,—An Act to continue and amend an Act made in the last Session,—and ends with the words,—Exportation of Malt for a limited Time.	The whole act.
12 Geo. 3. c. 2	Exportations and Importation (No. 2) Act 1772	An Act the title of which begins with the words,—An Act to continue for a further Time an Act made in the Eighth Year of His present Majesty's Reign,—and ends with the words,—British Dominions in America, for a limited Time.	The whole act.
12 Geo. 3. c. 3	Land Tax Act 1772	An Act for granting and Aid to His Majesty by a Land Tax, to be raised in Great Britain, for the Service of the Year One thousand seven hundred and seventy-two.	The whole act.
12 Geo. 3. c. 4	Mutiny Act 1772	An Act for punishing Mutiny and Desertion; and for the better Payment of the Army and their Quarters.	The whole act.
12 Geo. 3. c. 5	Marine Mutiny Act 1772	An Act for the Regulation of His Majesty's Marine Forces, while on Shore.	The whole act.
12 Geo. 3. c. 6	Malt Duties Act 1772	An Act for continuing and granting to His Majesty certain Duties upon Malt, Mum, Cyder, and Perry, for the Service of the Year One thousand seven hundred and seventy-two.	The whole act.
12 Geo. 3. c. 7	East India Company (No. 1) Act 1772	An Act the title of which begins with the words,—An Act for explaining and amending an Act made in the Seventh Year of His present Majesty,—and ends with the words,—said Act of Parliament.	The whole act.
12 Geo. 3. c. 10	Papists Act 1772	An Act for allowing further Time for Inrolment of Deeds and Wills made by Papists; and for Relief of Protestant Purchasers.	The whole act.
12 Geo. 3. c. 12	Mutiny in America Act 1772	An Act for further continuing Two Acts, made in the Sixth and Ninth Years of His Majesty's Reign, for punishing Mutiny and Desertion, and for the better Payment of the Army and their Quarters, in His Majesty's Dominions in America.	The whole act.
12 Geo. 3. c. 13	Militia Pay Act 1772	An Act for defraying the Charge of the Pay and Clothing of the Militia in that Part of Great Britain called England, for One Year beginning the Twenty-fifth day of March, One thousand seven hundred and seventy-two.	The whole act.
12 Geo. 3. c. 23	Relief of Insolvent Debtors, etc. Act 1772	An Act for the Relief of Insolvent Debtors; and for indemnifying the Marshal of the King's Bench Prison from Prosecutions at Law, for certain Escapes from the said Prison.	The whole act.
12 Geo. 3. c. 31	Indemnity Act 1772	An Act the title of which begins with the words,—An Act to indemnify such persons as omitted to qualify themselves,—and ends with the words,— Clerks to Attornies and Solicitors.	The whole act.
12 Geo. 3. c. 32	Importation Act 1772	An Act for allowing the free Importation of Rice into this Kingdom, from any of His Majesty's Colonies in America, for a limited Time.	The whole act.
12 Geo. 3. c. 33	Importation (No. 2) Act 1772	An Act for allowing the Importation of Wheat, Wheat Flour, Rye, Rye Meal, and Indian Corn, into this Kingdom, for a limited Time, free of Duty.	The whole act.
12 Geo. 3. c. 39	Unfunded Debt Act 1772	An Act for raising a certain Sum of Money by Loans or Exchequer Bills, for the Service of the Year One thousand seven hundred and seventy-two.	The whole act.
12 Geo. 3. c. 46	Excise Act 1772	An Act for the more effectual preventing of Frauds in the Revenues of Excise, with respect to Tea, Soap, Low Wines, and Spirits.	The whole act.
12 Geo. 3. c. 47	Bankrupts Act 1772	An Act the title of which begins with the words,—An Act to continue an Act made in the Fifth Year,—and ends with the words,—Bankrupts, in certain Cases, from their Imprisonment.	The whole act.
12 Geo. 3. c. 51	Diseases Among Cattle Act 1772	An Act for continuing an Act, made in the Tenth Year of the Reign of His present Majesty, to prevent the further spreading of the contagious Disorder among the Horned Cattle in Great Britain.	The whole act.
12 Geo. 3. c. 52	Allowance for Mint Prosecutions Act 1772	An Act the title of which begins with the words,—An Act to enable the Lords Commissioners of His Majesty's Treasury,—and ends with the words,—above the Sum yearly allowed for that Service.	The whole act.
12 Geo. 3. c. 53	Discharge to Lady Anne Jekyll's Executors Act 1772	An Act to enable the Lords of the Treasury to discharge the Executors of Lady Anne Jekyll from a Debt due to His Majesty, for the Use of the Sinking Fund, upon Payment of the same into the Exchequer.	The whole act.
12 Geo. 3. c. 56	Continuance of Certain Laws Act 1772	An Act the title of which begins with the words,—An Act to continue several Laws relating to the allowing the Importation of Salt from Europe,—and ends with the words,—Fees of Officers of the Customs, at any Naval Office in America.	The whole act.
12 Geo. 3. c. 70	Supply, etc. Act 1772	An Act the title of which begins with the words,—An Act for granting to His Majesty a certain Sum of Money,—and ends with the words,—Orders lost, burnt, or destroyed.	The whole act.
12 Geo. 3. c. 71	Repeal of Certain Laws Act 1772	An Act for repealing several Laws therein mentioned against Badgers, Engrossers, Forestallers, and Regrators, and for indemnifying Persons against Prosecutions for Offences committed against the said Acts.	The whole act.
12 Geo. 3. c. 72	Bills of Exchange (Scotland) Act 1772	An Act the title of which begins with the words,—An Act for rendering more effectual the Payment of the Creditors of Insolvent Debtors,—and ends with the words,—that Part of Great Britain called Scotland.	Except Sections Thirty-six, Thirty-seven, and Thirty-nine to Forty-three.
13 Geo. 3. c. 1	Importation and Exportation Act 1772	An Act the title of which begins with the words,—An Act for allowing the Importation of Wheat,—and ends with the words,—for a limited Time, free of Duty.	The whole act.
13 Geo. 3. c. 2	Importation and Exportation (No. 2) Act 1772	An Act for allowing the Importation of Wheat, Wheat-flour, Indian Corn, Indian Meal, Biscuit, Pease, Beans, Tares, Callivancies, and all other Sorts of Pulse, from His Majesty's Colonies in America, into this Kingdom, for a limited Time, free of Duty.	The whole act.
13 Geo. 3. c. 3 (Note: This was erroneously cited as "3 Geo. 3." in the act.)	Importation and Exportation (No. 3) Act 1772	An Act to prohibit the Exportation of Corn, Grain, Pease, Beans, Meal, Malt, Flour, Bread, Biscuit, and Starch; and also the Extraction of Low Wines and Spirits from Wheat and Wheat-flour, for a limited Time.	The whole act.
13 Geo. 3. c. 4	Importation and Exportation (No. 4) Act 1772	An Act the title of which begins with the words,—An Act to continue for a further Time, an Act, made in the Eighth Year of His present Majesty's Reign,—and ends with the words,—for a limited Time.	The whole act.
13 Geo. 3. c. 5	Importation and Exportation (No. 5) Act 1772	An Act the title of which begins with the words,—An Act to continue for a further Time, an Act, made in the Seventh Year of His present Majesty's Reign,—and ends with the words,—for a limited Time, free of Duty.	The whole act.
13 Geo. 3. c. 6	Malt Duties Act 1772	An Act for continuing and granting to His Majesty certain Duties upon Malt, Mum, Cyder, and Perry, for the Service of the Year One thousand seven hundred and seventy-three.	The whole act.
13 Geo. 3. c. 7	Importation (No. 3) Act 1772	An Act for allowing the free Importation of Rice into this Kingdom, from any of His Majesty's Colonies in America for a limited Time; and for encouraging the making of Starch from Rice.	The whole act.
13 Geo. 3. c. 8	Land Tax (No. 2) Act 1772	An Act for granting an Aid to His Majesty by a Land Tax, to be raised in Great Britain, for the Service of the Year One thousand seven hundred and seventy-three.	The whole act.
13 Geo. 3. c. 9	East India Company (No. 2) Act 1772	An Act to restrain the East India Company, for a limited Time, from making any Appointment of Commissioners for superintending and regulating the Company's Affairs, their Presidencies in the East Indies.	The whole act.
13 Geo. 3. c. 10	Mutiny (No. 2) Act 1772	An Act for punishing Mutiny and Desertion; and for the better Payment of the Army and their Quarters.	The whole act.
13 Geo. 3. c. 11	Marine Mutiny (No. 2) Act 1772	An Act for the Regulation of His Majesty's Marine Forces while on Shore.	The whole act.
13 Geo. 3. c. 13	Gunpowder Mill, Tonbridge Act 1772	An Act to enable certain Persons therein named to continue to work a Peele Mill, heretofore employed and used in making Battle Gunpowder, at Old Forge Farm, in the Parish of Tonbridge, in the County of Kent.	The whole act.
13 Geo. 3. c. 14	West Indian Mortgages Act 1772	An Act the title of which begins with the words,—An Act to encourage the Subjects of Foreign States to lend Money,—and ends with the words,— Freehold or Leasehold Estates. Repealed as to all Her Majesty's Dominions.	The whole act.
13 Geo. 3. c. 24	Mutiny in America (No. 2) Act 1772	An Act for further continuing Two Acts, made in the Sixth and Ninth Years of His Majesty's Reign, for punishing Mutiny and Desertion, and for the better Payment of the Army and their Quarters, in His Majesty's Dominions in America.	The whole act.
13 Geo. 3. c. 26	British Ships Act 1772	An Act for preventing Abuses in the Sale of Shares of British-built Ships to Foreigners. Repealed as to all Her Majesty's Dominions.	The whole act.
13 Geo. 3. c. 32	Stealing of Vegetables Act 1772	An Act the title of which begins with the words,—An Act for repealing so much of an Act, made in the Twenty-third Year,—and ends with the words,—Pease and Carrots.	Section Six.
13 Geo. 3. c. 54	Game (Scotland) Act 1772	An Act for the more effectual Preservation of the Game in that Part of Great Britain called Scotland; and for repealing and amending several of the Laws now in being relative thereto.	The last Section.
13 Geo. 3. c. 56	Sale of Spirits, etc. Act 1772	An Act the title of which begins with the words,—An Act for the more effectually restraining the retailing of distilled Spirituous Liquors,—and ends with the words,— Stuffs, to be printed, painted, stained, or dyed, in Great Britain.	The whole act.
13 Geo. 3. c. 59	Plate (Offences) Act 1772	An Act the title of which begins with the words,—An Act for repealing so much of an Act of the Thirty-first Year,—and ends with the words,—Punishment for the said Offence.	Section One.
13 Geo. 3. c. 64	East India Company (No. 4) Act 1772	An Act the title of which begins with the words,—An Act for granting to His Majesty a Sum of Money to be raised by Exchequer Bills,—and ends with the words,—Merchants of England trading to the East Indies.	The whole act.
13 Geo. 3. c. 66	Unfunded Debt Act 1772	An Act for raising a certain Sum of Money by Loans or Exchequer Bills, for the Service of the Year One thousand seven hundred and seventy-three.	The whole act.
13 Geo. 3. c. 69	Importation and Exportation (No. 6) Act 1772	An Act for further continuing an Act made in the Fourth Year of the Reign of His present Majesty for importing Salt from Europe into the Province of Quebec in America, for a limited Time.	The whole act.
13 Geo. 3. c. 70	Importation and Exportation (No. 7) Act 1772	An Act the title of which begins with the words,—An Act to continue an Act, made in the Thirty-first Year,—and ends with the words,—Duty upon Culm exported thither in Foreign Shipping.	The whole act.
13 Geo. 3. c. 76	Indemnity (No. 3) Act 1772	An Act to indemnify Justices of the Peace, Deputy Lieutenants, and Officers of the Militia, or others, who have omitted to register or deliver in their Qualifications within the Time limited by Law, and for giving further Time for those Purposes.	The whole act.
13 Geo. 3. c. 77	Supply, etc. (No. 2) Act 1772	An Act the title of which begins with the words,—An Act for granting to His Majesty a certain Sum of Money out of the Sinking Fund,—and ends with the words,—Principles upon which the same was constructed.	The whole act.
13 Geo. 3. c. 79	Bank of England Notes Act 1773	An Act the title of which begins with the words,—An Act for the more effectual preventing the forging of the Notes,—and ends with the words,— Bills of the said Governor and Company.	The whole act.
13 Geo. 3. c. 82	Lying-in Hospitals Act 1773	An Act for the better Regulation of Lying-in Hospitals, and other Places, appropriated for the charitable Reception of pregnant Women; and also to provide for the Settlement of Bastard Children, born in such Hospitals and Places.	Section Eight.
14 Geo. 3. c. 1	Land Tax Act 1774	An Act for granting an Aid to His Majesty by a Land Tax to be raised in Great Britain, for the Service of the Year One thousand seven hundred and seventy-four.	The whole act.
14 Geo. 3. c. 2	Malt Duties Act 1774	An Act for continuing and granting to His Majesty certain Duties upon Malt, Mum, Cyder, and Perry, for the Service of the Year One thousand seven hundred and seventy-four.	The whole act.
14 Geo. 3. c. 3	Mutiny Act 1774	An Act for punishing Mutiny and Desertion; and for the better Payment of the Army and their Quarters.	The whole act.
14 Geo. 3. c. 4	Marine Mutiny Act 1774	An Act for the Regulation of His Majesty's Marine Forces while on Shore.	The whole act.
14 Geo. 3. c. 5	Exportation Act 1774	An Act the title of which begins with the words,—An Act to allow the Exportation of Corn,—and ends with the words,—Island of Alderney.	The whole act.
14 Geo. 3. c. 6	Mutiny in America Act 1774	An Act for further continuing Two Acts, made in the Sixth and Ninth Years of His Majesty's Reign, for punishing Mutiny and Desertion, and for the better Payment of the Army and their Quarters, in His Majesty's Dominions in America.	The whole act.
14 Geo. 3. c. 9	Importation Act 1774	An Act the title of which begins with the words,—An Act to continue for a further Time an Act, made in the Eighth Year,—and ends with the words, —Butter from the British Dominions in America, for a limited Time.	The whole act.
14 Geo. 3. c. 11	Exportation (No. 3) Act 1774	An Act to allow the Exportation of a limited Quantity of Biscuit and Pease to the Island of Newfoundland, for the Benefit of the British Fishery there.	The whole act.
14 Geo. 3. c. 17	Land Tax (No. 2) Act 1774	An Act the title of which begins with the words,—An Act for appointing Commissioners to put in Execution an Act of this Session,—and ends with the words,—Commissioners of the Land Tax.	The whole act.
14 Geo. 3. c. 18	Militia Pay Act 1774	An Act for defraying the Charge of the Pay and Cloathing of the Militia in that Part of Great Britain called England, for One Year, beginning the Twenty-fifth Day of March, One thousand seven hundred and seventy-four.	The whole act.
14 Geo. 3. c. 20	Discharged Prisoners Act 1774	An Act for the Relief of Prisoners charged with Felony or other Crimes, who shall be acquitted or discharged by Proclamation, respecting the Payment of Fees to Gaolers, and giving a Recompence for such Fees out of the County Rates.	The whole act.
14 Geo. 3. c. 26	Exportation (No. 4) Act 1774	An Act the title of which begins with the words,—An Act to allow the Exportation of a limited Quantity of Wheat-meal,—and ends with the words,— Servants residing there.	The whole act.
14 Geo. 3. c. 34	East India Trade Act 1774	An Act the title of which begins with the words,—An Act for granting further Time to the United Company of Merchants of England,—and ends with the words,—Drawbacks on the Exportation of such Teas.	The whole act.
14 Geo. 3. c. 37	Papists Act 1774	An Act for allowing further Time for Inrolment of Deeds and Wills made by Papists, and for Relief of Protestant Purchasers.	The whole act.
14 Geo. 3. c. 39	Administration of Justice Act 1774	An Act the title of which begins with the words,—An Act for the impartial Administration of Justice,—and ends with the words,—Massachuset's Bay in New England.	The whole act.
14 Geo. 3. c. 41	Free Ports (Jamaica) Act 1774	An Act for further continuing so much of Two Acts, made in the Sixth and Fifteenth Years of the Reign of His present Majesty, as relates to the opening and establishing certain free Ports in the Island of Jamaica.	The whole act.
14 Geo. 3. c. 44	Reeling False or Short Yarn Act 1774	An Act the title of which begins with the words,—An Act to amend an Act, made in the Twenty-second Year,—and ends with the words,—and for the better Payment of their Wages.	Section Three.
14 Geo. 3. c. 46	Rewards for Apprehensions, Durham Act 1774	An Act the title of which begins with the words,—An Act to enable the Commissioners for executing the Office of Treasurer,—and ends with the words,— Offenders in the County Palatine of Durham.	The whole act.
14 Geo. 3. c. 49	Madhouses Act 1774	An Act for regulating Madhouses.	The whole act.
14 Geo. 3. c. 54	Army Act 1774	An Act for the better providing suitable Quarters for Officers and Soldiers in His Majesty's Service in North America.	The whole act.
14 Geo. 3. c. 58	Parliamentary Elections (No. 2) Act 1774	An Act the title of which begins with the words,—An Act to continue an Act, made in the First Year,—and ends with the words,—are to be chosen.	The whole act.
14 Geo. 3. c. 59	Health of Prisoners Act 1774	An Act for preserving the Health of Prisoners in Gaol, and preventing the Gaol Distemper.	The whole act.
14 Geo. 3. c. 60	Indemnity of Innkeepers Act 1774	An Act the title of which begins with the words,—An Act for indemnifying the Innkeepers,—and ends with the words,—Spirituous Liquors, without proper Licences, upon certain Conditions.	The whole act.
14 Geo. 3. c. 66	Discovery of Longitude at Sea Act 1774	An Act the title of which begins with the words,—An Act for the Repeal of all former Acts concerning the Longitude,—and ends with the words,— Experiments relating thereto.	The whole act.
14 Geo. 3. c. 67	Continuance of Laws Act 1774	An Act the title of which begins with the words,—An Act to continue the several Laws therein mentioned,—and ends with the words,—any Part of America Southward of South Carolina and Georgia.	The whole act.
14 Geo. 3. c. 69	Loans or Exchequer Bills Act 1774	An Act for raising a certain Sum of Money by Loans or Exchequer Bills, for the Service of the Year One thousand seven hundred and seventy-four.	The whole act.
14 Geo. 3. c. 72	Duty on Cotton Stuffs, etc. Act 1774	An Act for ascertaining the Duty on printed, painted, stained, or dyed Stuffs, wholly made of Cotton, and manufactured in Great Britain, and for allowing the Use and Wear thereof, under certain Regulations.	The whole act.
14 Geo. 3. c. 77	Insolvent Debtors, etc., Relief Act 1774	An Act for the Relief of Insolvent Debtors; and for the Relief of Bankrupts, in certain cases.	The whole act.
14 Geo. 3. c. 80	Continuance of Laws (No. 2) Act 1774	An Act to continue the several Laws therein mentioned, for the better Encouragement of the making of Sail Cloth in Great Britain, and for securing the Duties upon foreign-made Sail Cloth, and charging foreign-made Sails with a Duty.	The whole act.
14 Geo. 3. c. 83	British North America (Quebec) Act 1774	An Act for making more effectual Provision for the Government of the Province of Quebec, in North America.	Sections Twelve to Sixteen. Repealed as to all Her Majesty's Dominions.
14 Geo. 3. c. 85	Supply, etc. Act 1774	An Act the title of which begins with the words,—An Act for granting to His Majesty a certain Sum of Money out of the Sinking Fund,—and ends with the words,—paying the Creditors of the forfeited Estates in Scotland.	The whole act.
14 Geo. 3. c. 86	Continuance of Laws, etc. Act 1774	An Act the title of which begins with the words,—An Act to continue several Laws therein mentioned,—and ends with the words,—subsequent Acts.	The whole act.
14 Geo. 3. c. 87	Driving of Cattle (Metropolis) Act 1774	An Act to prevent the Mischiefs that arise from driving Cattle within the Cities of London and Westminster, and Liberties thereof, and the Bills of Mortality.	The whole act.
14 Geo. 3. c. 88	Quebec Finance Act 1774	An Act to establish a Fund towards further defraying the Charges of the Administration of Justice, and Support of the Civil Government within the Province of Quebec, in America.	Sections One to Four. Repealed as to all Her Majesty's Dominions.
14 Geo. 3. c. 89	Sir Joseph Jekyll's Bequest Act 1774	An Act the title of which begins with the words,—An Act to enable His Majesty to allow the Administrator,—and ends with the words,—and for applying the same as therein is mentioned.	The whole act.
15 Geo. 3. c. 2	Malt Duties Act 1775	An Act for continuing and granting to His Majesty certain Duties upon Malt, Mum, Cyder, and Perry, for the Service of the Year One thousand seven hundred and seventy-five.	The whole act.
15 Geo. 3. c. 3	Land Tax Act 1775	An Act for granting an Aid to His Majesty by a Land Tax to be raised in Great Britain, for the Service of the Year One thousand seven hundred and seventy-five.	The whole act.
15 Geo. 3. c. 4	Marine Mutiny Act 1775	An Act for the Regulation of His Majesty's Marine Forces while on Shore.	The whole act.
15 Geo. 3. c. 5	Exportation Act 1775	An Act the title of which begins with the words,—An Act to repeal so much of an Act, made in the Fourteenth Year,—and ends with the words,— exported to any of His Majesty's Colonies or Plantations in America.	The whole act.
15 Geo. 3. c. 6	Mutiny Act 1775	An Act for punishing Mutiny and Desertion; and for the better Payment of the Army and their Quarters.	The whole act.
15 Geo. 3. c. 7	Importation (No. 2) Act 1775	An Act the title of which begins with the words,—An Act to continue for a further Time an Act, made in the Eighth Year,—and ends with the words,— all Kinds of Pulse.	The whole act.
15 Geo. 3. c. 8	Militia Pay Act 1775	An Act for defraying the Charge of the Pay and Cloathing of the Militia in that Part of Great Britain called England, for One Year, beginning the Twenty-fifth Day of March, One thousand seven hundred and seventy-five.	The whole act.
15 Geo. 3. c. 15	Mutiny in America Act 1775	An Act the title of which begins with the words,—An Act to amend and render more effectual in His Majesty's Dominions in America, an Act,— and ends with the words,—His Majesty's Subjects in America.	The whole act.
15 Geo. 3. c. 22	Supreme Court Buildings Act 1775	An Act the title of which begins with the words,—An Act for vesting Part of the Garden of the Society of Lincoln's Inn,—and ends with the words,—for the Register of the said Court.	Sections Two and Three.
15 Geo. 3. c. 26	Land Tax (Commissioners) Act 1775	An Act the title of which begins with the words,—An Act for appointing Commissioners for putting in Execution an Act of this Session,—and ends with the words,—One thousand seven hundred and seventy-five.	The whole act.
15 Geo. 3. c. 27	Measurement of Coal Wagons, etc. Act 1775	An Act for admeasuring Waggons and other Carriages used in loading Coals on Board Ships at the several Ports of this Kingdom, in the same Manner as at the Ports of Newcastle and Sunderland.	The whole act.
15 Geo. 3. c. 28	Colliers and Salters (Scotland) Act 1775	An Act for altering, explaining, and amending several Acts of the Parliament of Scotland, respecting Colliers, Coal-bearers, and Salters.	The whole act.
15 Geo. 3. c. 29	Clan Gregor (Scotland) Act 1775	An Act the title of which begins with the words,—An Act to repeal Two Acts made in the Parliament of Scotland,—and ends with the words,—One thousand six hundred and twenty-one, concerning the People called Mac Gregours.	The whole act.
15 Geo. 3. c. 31	Newfoundland Fisheries Act 1775	An Act the title of which begins with the words,—An Act for the Encouragement of the Fisheries carried on from Great Britain,—and ends with the words,—at the End of the Fishing Season. Repealed as to all Her Majesty's Dominions.	The whole act.
15 Geo. 3. c. 32	Erection of Cottages Act 1775	An Act to repeal an Act, passed in the Thirty-first Year of the Reign of Her Majesty Queen Elizabeth, (intituled An Act against the erecting and maintaining of Cottages).	The whole act.
15 Geo. 3. c. 38	Loans or Exchequer Bills Act 1775	An Act for raising a certain Sum of Money by Loans or Exchequer Bills, for the Service of the Year One thousand seven hundred and seventy-five.	The whole act.
15 Geo. 3. c. 40	Canada Act 1775	An Act the title of which begins with the words,—An Act for amending and explaining an Act, passed in the Fourteenth Year,—and ends with the words,—Civil Government of the Province of Quebec, in America. Repealed as to all Her Majesty's Dominions.	The whole act.
15 Geo. 3. c. 42	Appropriation Act 1775	An Act the title of which begins with the words,—An Act for granting to His Majesty a certain Sum of Money out of the Sinking Fund,—and ends with the words,—Supplies granted in this Session of Parliament.	The whole act.
15 Geo. 3. c. 44	East India Company Act 1775	An Act the title of which begins with the words,—An Act to continue, for a limited Time, so much of an Act made in the Thirteenth Year,—and ends with the words,—Manufacture of Great Britain to their Settlements in the East Indies to a certain Value.	The whole act.
15 Geo. 3. c. 45 (Note: This was erroneously cited as "15 Geo. 3. c. 5" in the Act.)	Exportation of Army Clothing Act 1775	An Act the title of which begins with the words,—An Act for allowing the Cloathing and Accoutrements necessary for His Majesty's Forces,—and ends with the words,—Flax Seed imported into Ireland for a limited Time. Repealed as to all Her Majesty's Dominions.	The whole act.
15 Geo. 3. c. 56	Supreme Court Buildings (No. 2) Act 1775	An Act the title of which begins with the words,—An Act for applying the Funds provided for rebuilding,—and ends with the words,—Six Clerks in Chancery Lane; and for other Purposes.	Sections One, Three to Eight, and Eleven.
16 Geo. 3. c. 1.	Malt Duties Act 1776	An Act for continuing and granting to His Majesty certain Duties upon Malt, Mum, Cyder, and Perry, for the Service of the Year One thousand seven hundred and seventy-six.	The whole act.
16 Geo. 3. c. 2	Mutiny Act 1776	An Act for punishing Mutiny and Desertion; and for the better Payment of the Army and their Quarters.	The whole act.
16 Geo. 3. c. 3	Militia Act 1776	An Act the title of which begins with the words,—An Act to enable His Majesty for a limited Time to call out and assemble the Militia,—and ends with the words,—Manner therein mentioned.	The whole act.
16 Geo. 3. c. 4	Land Tax Act 1776	An Act for granting an Aid to His Majesty by a Land Tax, to be raised in Great Britain, for the Service of the Year One thousand seven hundred and seventy-six.	The whole act.
16 Geo. 3. c. 7	Marine Mutiny Act 1776	An Act for the Regulation of His Majesty's Marine Forces while on Shore.	The whole act.
16 Geo. 3. c. 11	Mutiny in America Act 1776	An Act the title of which begins with the words,—An Act to continue an Act made in the last Session,—and ends with the words,—His Majesty's Marine Forces in America.	The whole act.
16 Geo. 3. c. 12	Customs Act 1776	An Act to continue, for a further Time, an Act made in the Twenty-fifth Year of His present Majesty's Reign, intituled An Act to discontinue, for a limited Time, the Duties payable upon the Importation of Tallow, Hogs-lard, and Grease.	The whole act.
16 Geo. 3. c. 14	Land Tax (No. 2) Act 1776	An Act the title of which begins with the words,—An Act for rectifying Mistakes in the names of several of the Commissioners,—and ends with the words,—One thousand seven hundred and seventy-six.	The whole act.
16 Geo. 3. c. 19	Militia Pay Act 1776	An Act for defraying the Charge of the Pay and Cloathing of the Militia in that Part of Great Britain called England, for One Year, beginning the Twenty-fifth day of March, One thousand seven hundred and seventy-six.	The whole act.
16 Geo. 3. c. 20	Navigation Act 1776	An Act for the better supply of Mariners and Seamen to serve in His Majesty's Ships of War, and on board Merchant Ships, and other Trading Ships and Vessels.	The whole act.
16 Geo. 3. c. 35	Loans or Exchequer Bills Act 1776	An Act for raising a certain Sum of Money by Loans or Exchequer Bills, for the Service of the Year One thousand seven hundred and seventy-six.	The whole act.
16 Geo. 3. c. 38	Insolvent Debtors Relief Act 1776	An Act for the Relief of Insolvent Debtors; and for the Relief of Bankrupts, in certain Cases.	The whole act.
16 Geo. 3. c. 40	Poor Act 1776	An Act the title of which begins with the words,—An Act for obliging the Overseers of the Poor,—and ends with the words,—Returns upon Oath, and to cause them to be transmitted to the Clerk of the Parliaments.	The whole act.
16 Geo. 3. c. 41	Importation (No. 2) Act 1776	An Act for granting a Bounty upon Flax Seed, the Growth of the United Provinces, or of the Austrian Netherlands, imported into Ireland, for a limited Time.	The whole act.
16 Geo. 3. c. 43	Criminal Law Act 1776	An Act to authorise, for a limited Time, the Punishment by Hard Labour of Offenders who, for certain Crimes, are or shall become liable to be transported to any of His Majesty's Colonies and Plantations.	The whole act.
16 Geo. 3. c. 45	Loans or Exchequer Bills (No. 2) Act 1776	An Act for enabling His Majesty to raise the sum of One Million, for the Uses and Purposes therein mentioned.	The whole act.
16 Geo. 3. c. 46	Mint Prosecutions Expenses Act 1776	An Act the title of which begins with the words,—An Act to enable the Commissioners of His Majesty's Treasury,—and ends with the words,—Coin, over and above the Sum yearly allowed for that Purpose.	The whole act.
16 Geo. 3. c. 49	Appropriation Act 1776	An Act the title of which begins with the words,—An Act for granting to His Majesty a certain Sum of Money out of the Sinking Fund,—and ends with the words,—Orders, lost, burnt, or destroyed.	The whole act.
16 Geo. 3. c. 51	East India Company Act 1776	An Act the title of which begins with the words,—An Act for granting further Time for allowing the Drawback,—and ends with the words,—One thousand seven hundred and seventy-three.	The whole act.
16 Geo. 3. c. 54	Continuance of Laws Act 1776	An Act the title of which begins with the words,—An Act to continue an Act, made in the Fifth Year,—and ends with the words,—retain the Tender thereof beyond a certain Sum.	The whole act.
17 Geo. 3. c. 1	Land Tax (No. 3) Act 1776	An Act for granting an Aid to His Majesty by a Land Tax, to be raised in Great Britain, for the Service of the Year One thousand seven hundred and seventy-seven.	The whole act.
17 Geo. 3. c. 2.	Malt Duties Act (No. 2) 1776	An Act for continuing and granting to His Majesty certain Duties upon Malt, Mum, Cyder and Perry, for the Service of the Year One thousand seven hundred and seventy-seven.	The whole act.
17 Geo. 3. c. 3.	Mutiny (No. 2) Act 1776	An Act for punishing Mutiny and Desertion; and for the better Payment of the Army and their Quarters.	The whole act.
17 Geo. 3. c. 4	Marine Mutiny (No. 2) Act 1776	An Act for the Regulation of His Majesty's Marine Forces while on Shore.	The whole act.
17 Geo. 3. c. 9	Habeas Corpus Suspension Act 1776	An Act to impower His Majesty to secure and detain Persons charged with, or suspected of, the Crime of High Treason, committed in any of His Majesty's Colonies or Plantations in America, or on the High Seas, or the Crime of Piracy.	The whole act.
17 Geo. 3. c. 10	Militia Pay (No. 2) Act 1776	An Act for defraying the Charge of the Pay and Cloathing of the Militia in that Part of Great Britain called England, for One Year, beginning the Twenty-fifth day of March, One thousand seven hundred and seventy-seven.	The whole act.
17 Geo. 3. c. 21	Civil List Act 1776	An Act for the better Support of His Majesty's Household, and of the Honour and Dignity of the Crown of Great Britain.	The whole act.
17 Geo. 3. c. 28	Exportation (No. 2) Act 1776	An Act the title of which begins with the words,—An Act to revive and continue such Part of an Act made in the last Session,—and ends with the words,—One thousand seven hundred and seventy-seven.	The whole act.
17 Geo. 3. c. 29	Adulteration of Tea Act 1776	An Act for the more effectual Prevention of the manufacturing of Ash, Elder, Sloe, and other Leaves, in Imitation of Tea, and to prevent Frauds in the Revenue of Excise in respect to Tea.	Section Seven.
17 Geo. 3. c. 34	Navigation (No. 2) Act 1776	An Act for the better Supply of Mariners and Seamen to serve in His Majesty's Ships of War, and on Board Merchant Ships and other Trading Ships and Vessels.	The whole act.
17 Geo. 3. c. 35	Importation (No. 3) Act 1776	An Act the title of which begins with the words,—An Act for further continuing an Act, made in the Sixth Year,—and ends with the words,—Combinations of Workmen employed in the Silk Manufacture.	The whole act.
17 Geo. 3. c. 36	First Meetings of Commissioners, etc. Act 1776	An Act for enlarging the Times appointed for the First Meetings of Commissioners or Trustees for putting in Execution certain Acts of this Session of Parliament.	The whole act.
17 Geo. 3. c. 38	Loans or Exchequer Bills (No. 3) Act 1776	An Act for raising a certain Sum of Money by Loans or Exchequer Bills, for the Service of the Year One thousand seven hundred and seventy-seven.	The whole act.
17 Geo. 3. c. 44	Continuance of Laws Act 1776	An Act the title of which begins with the words,—An Act to continue the several Laws therein mentioned,—and ends with the words,—Exportation of British-made Cordage.	The whole act.
17 Geo. 3. c. 45	Papists Act 1776	An Act for allowing further Time for Inrolment of Deeds and Wills made by Papists, and for Relief of Protestant Purchasers.	The whole act.
17 Geo. 3. c. 47	Appropriation Act 1776	An Act the title of which begins with the words,—An Act for granting to His Majesty a certain Sum of Money out of the Sinking Fund,—and ends with the words,—Supplies granted in this Session of Parliament.	The whole act.
17 Geo. 3. c. 48	Finding of the Longitude at Sea Act 1776	An Act the title of which begins with the words,—An Act for rendering more effectual an Act, made in the Fourteenth Year,—and ends with the words,— Navigation; and to the making of Experiments relating thereto.	The whole act.
17 Geo. 3. c. 51	Loans or Exchequer Bills (No. 4) Act 1776	An Act for enabling His Majesty to raise the Sum of One Million, for the Uses and Purposes therein mentioned.	The whole act.
17 Geo. 3. c. 52	Duties on Soap, etc. Act 1776	An Act the title of which begins with the words,—An Act for better securing the Duties on Soap,—and ends with the words,—Vessels bound on long Voyages, for a limited Time.	The whole act.
17 Geo. 3. c. 55	Manufacture of Hats Act 1776	An Act for the better regulating the Hat Manufactory.	Sections One and Five.
17 Geo. 3. c. 56	Frauds by Workmen Act 1777	An Act the title of which begins with the words,—An Act for amending and rendering more effectual the several Laws,—and ends with the words,—Provisions to prevent Frauds by Journeymen Dyers.	Section Twenty-four.
18 Geo. 3. c. 1	Habeas Corpus Suspension Act 1778	An Act the title of which begins with the words,—An Act for continuing an Act, made in the last Session of Parliament,—and ends with the words,— Crime of Piracy.	The whole act.
18 Geo. 3. c. 2	Land Tax Act 1778	An Act for granting an Aid to His Majesty by a Land Tax, to be raised in Great Britain, for the Service of the Year One thousand seven hundred and seventy-eight.	The whole act.
18 Geo. 3. c. 3	Malt Duties Act 1778	An Act for continuing and granting to His Majesty certain Duties upon Malt, Mum, Cyder, and Perry, for the Service of the Year One thousand seven hundred and seventy-eight.	The whole act.
18 Geo. 3. c. 4	Mutiny Act 1778	An Act for punishing Mutiny and Desertion; and for the better Payment of the Army and their Quarters.	The whole act.
18 Geo. 3. c. 5	Marine Mutiny Act 1778	An Act for the Regulation of His Majesty's Marine Forces while on Shore.	The whole act.
18 Geo. 3. c. 6	Navigation Act 1778	An Act for the better Supply of Mariners and Seamen to serve in His Majesty's Ships of War, and on Board Merchant Ships and other Trading Ships and Vessels.	The whole act.
18 Geo. 3. c. 11	Province of Massachusetts Bay Act 1778	An Act for repealing an Act, passed in the Fourteenth Year of His present Majesty's Reign, intituled An Act for the better regulating the Government of the Province of the Massachusetts Bay in New England.	The whole act.
18 Geo. 3. c. 12	Taxation of Colonies Act 1778	An Act the title of which begins with the words,—An Act for removing all Doubts and Apprehensions concerning Taxation,—and ends with the words,—Colony or Plantation in America, or relates thereto.	Section Two.
18 Geo. 3. c. 13	American Rebellion Act 1778	An Act to enable His Majesty to appoint Commissioners with sufficient Powers to treat, consult, and agree upon the Means of quieting the Disorders now subsisting in certain of the Colonies, Plantations, and Provinces of North America.	The whole act.
18 Geo. 3. c. 23	Land Tax (Commissioners) Act 1778	An Act the title of which begins with the words,—An Act for appointing Commissioners to put in Execution an Act of this Session,—and ends with the words,—Commissioners of the Land Tax.	The whole act.
18 Geo. 3. c. 31	Settlement on Royal Princes, etc. Act 1778	An Act the title of which begins with the words,—An Act for enabling His Majesty to settle on their Royal Highnesses,—and ends with the words,— Princess Sophia Matilda One other Annuity of Eight thousand pounds per Annum.	The whole act.
18 Geo. 3. c. 38	Loans or Exchequer Bills Act 1778	An Act for raising a certain Sum of Money by Loans or Exchequer Bills, for the Service of the Year One thousand seven hundred and seventy-eight.	The whole act.
18 Geo. 3. c. 42	Smalls Lighthouse Act 1778	An Act to enable the Corporation of Trinity House of Deptford Strond to establish and maintain a Lighthouse on the Rocks, called The Smalls, in Saint George's Channel.	Except Sections Four and Five.
18 Geo. 3. c. 45	Continuance of Laws Act 1778	An Act the title of which begins with the words,—An Act to continue the several Laws therein mentioned,—and ends with the words,—Articles, to His Majesty's Sugar Colonies in America.	The whole act.
18 Geo. 3. c. 46	Papists (No. 1) Act 1778	An Act for allowing further Time for Inrollment of Deeds and Wills made by Papists, and for Relief of Protestant Purchasers.	The whole act.
18 Geo. 3. c. 52	Insolvent Debtors Relief, etc. Act 1778	An Act for the Relief of Insolvent Debtors; and for the Relief of Bankrupts in certain Cases.	The whole act.
18 Geo. 3. c. 54	Appropriation Act 1778	An Act the title of which begins with the words,—An Act for granting to His Majesty a certain Sum of Money out of the Sinking Fund,—and ends with the words,—Money which hath arisen by the Two Sevenths Excise.	The whole act.
18 Geo. 3. c. 57	Loans or Exchequer Bills (No. 2) Act 1778	An Act for raising a further Sum of Money, by Loans or Exchequer Bills, for the Service of the Year One thousand seven hundred and seventy-eight.	The whole act.
18 Geo. 3. c. 62	Criminal Law Act 1778	An Act the title of which begins with the words,—An Act to continue an Act, made in the Sixteenth Year,—and ends with the words,—transported to any of His Majesty's Colonies and Plantations.	The whole act.
18 Geo. 3. c. 64	Loans or Exchequer Bills (No. 3) Act 1778	An Act for enabling His Majesty to raise the Sum of One Million, for the Uses and Purposes therein mentioned.	The whole act.
18 Geo. 3. c. 65	Provision for Earl of Chatham Act 1778	An Act the title of which begins with the words,—An Act for settling and securing a certain Annuity on the Earl of Chatham,—and ends with the words,—said late Earl to His Majesty and the Publick.	The whole act.
19 Geo. 3. c. 1	Habeas Corpus Suspension Act 1779	An Act the title of which begins with the words,—An Act for further continuing an Act, made in the Seventeenth Year,—and ends with the words,—Crime of Piracy.	The whole act.
19 Geo. 3. c. 2	Land Tax Act 1779	An Act for granting an Aid to His Majesty by a Land Tax, to be raised in Great Britain, for the Service of the Year One thousand seven hundred and seventy-nine.	The whole act.
19 Geo. 3. c. 3	Malt Duties Act 1779	An Act for continuing and granting to His Majesty certain Duties upon Malt, Mum, Cyder, and Perry, for the Service of the Year One thousand seven hundred and seventy-nine.	The whole act.
19 Geo. 3. c. 4	Customs Act 1779	An Act for granting further Time for allowing the Drawback upon the Exportation of certain Muslins, Calicoes, and Cottons.	The whole act.
19 Geo. 3. c. 6	Court-martial on Admiral Keppel Act 1779	An Act the title of which begins with the words,—An Act to authorise the Lord High Admiral,—and ends with the words,—Honourable Augustus Keppel, to be holden on Shore.	The whole act.
19 Geo. 3. c. 8	Marine Mutiny Act 1779	An Act for the Regulation of His Majesty's Marine Forces while on Shore.	The whole act.
19 Geo. 3. c. 9	Importation of Silk Act 1779	An Act for allowing the Importation of fine organzined Italian Thrown Silk in any Ships or Vessels, for a limited Time.	The whole act.
19 Geo. 3. c. 10	Recruiting Act 1779	An Act for repealing an Act, made in the last Session of Parliament, intituled An Act for the more easy and better recruiting of His Majesty's Land Forces and Marines; and for substituting other and more effectual Provisions in the Place thereof.	The whole act.
19 Geo. 3. c. 14	Navigation Act 1779	An Act for the better Supply of Mariners and Seamen to serve in His Majesty's Ships of War, and on Board Merchant Ships and other trading Ships and Vessels.	The whole act.
19 Geo. 3. c. 16	Mutiny Act 1779	An Act for punishing Mutiny and Desertion; and for the better Payment of the Army and their Quarters.	The whole act.
19 Geo. 3. c. 19	Militia Pay Act 1779	An Act for defraying the Charge of the Pay and Cloathing of the Militia in that Part of Great Britain called England, for One Year, beginning the Twenty-fifth day of March, One thousand seven hundred and seventy-nine.	The whole act.
19 Geo. 3. c. 20	Ministers' Widows Fund (Scotland) Act 1779	An Act the title of which begins with the words,—An Act for the better raising and securing a Fund for a Provision for the Widows,—and ends with the words,— King George the Second for those Purposes.	Sections One, Twenty-seven, Twenty-eight, Forty-two, Forty-six, Eighty-five, and Eighty-six.
19 Geo. 3. c. 27	Bounties Act 1779	An Act the title of which begins with the words,—An Act for further continuing and extending the Provisions of Two Acts,—and ends with the words,— Sheeting and other Linen, of above a certain Breadth.	The whole act.
19 Geo. 3. c. 28	Importation Act 1779	An Act the title of which begins with the words,—An Act to permit, during the present Hostilities with France,—and ends with the words,—Goods which have been seized in pursuance of the said Act.	The whole act.
19 Geo. 3. c. 37	Bounty on Hemp Act 1779	An Act for granting a Bounty upon the Importation into this Kingdom of Hemp, the Growth of the Kingdom of Ireland, for a limited Time.	The whole act.
19 Geo. 3. c. 38	Exchequer Court (Scotland) Act 1779	An Act for altering the Times of holding the Martinmas and Candlemas Terms in the Court of Exchequer in Scotland.	The whole act.
19 Geo. 3. c. 54	Criminal Law Act 1779	An Act the title of which begins with the words,—An Act for further continuing, for a limited Time, an Act, made in the Sixteenth Year,—and ends with the words,—transported to any of His Majesty's Colonies and Plantations.	The whole act.
19 Geo. 3. c. 55	First Meetings of Commissioners, etc. Act 1779	An Act for enlarging the Times appointed for the meetings of Commissioners or Trustees for putting in Execution certain Acts of this Session of Parliament.	The whole act.
19 Geo. 3. c. 61	East India Company Act 1779	An Act the title of which begins with the words,—An Act for continuing in the Possession of the United Company of Merchants of England,—and ends with the words,—as will expire in the Course of the present Year.	The whole act.
19 Geo. 3. c. 63	Loans or Exchequer Bills Act 1779	An Act for raising a certain Sum of Money, by Loans or Exchequer Bills, for the Service of the Year One Thousand seven hundred and seventy-nine.	The whole act.
19 Geo. 3. c. 64	Loans or Exchequer Bills (No. 2) Act 1779	An Act for raising a further Sum of Money, by Loans or Exchequer Bills, for the Service of the Year One thousand seven hundred and seventy-nine.	The whole act.
19 Geo. 3. c. 71	Appropriation Act 1779	An Act the title of which begins with the words,—An Act for granting to His Majesty a certain Sum of Money out of the Sinking Fund,—and ends with the words,—Supplies granted in this Session of Parliament.	The whole act.
19 Geo. 3. c. 73	Loans or Exchequer Bills (No. 3) Act 1779	An Act for enabling His Majesty to raise the Sum of One Million, for the Uses and Purposes therein mentioned.	The whole act.
19 Geo. 3. c. 74	Penitentiary Act 1779	An Act to explain and amend the Laws relating to the Transportation, Imprisonment, and other Punishment, of certain Offenders.	The whole act.
19 Geo. 3. c. 75	Navy (No. 2) Act 1779	An Act for removing certain Difficulties with respect to the more speedy and effectual Manning of His Majesty's Navy, for a limited Time.	The whole act.
20 Geo. 3. c. 1	Parliament Act 1780	An Act for holding the ensuing Election of a Knight of the Shire for the County of Southampton, at the town of New Alresford, in the said County.	The whole act.
20 Geo. 3. c. 2	Land Tax Act 1780	An Act for granting an Aid to His Majesty by a Land Tax, to be raised in Great Britain, for the Service of the Year One thousand seven hundred and eighty.	The whole act.
20 Geo. 3. c. 3	Malt Duties Act 1780	An Act for continuing and granting to His Majesty certain Duties upon Malt, Mum, Cyder, and Perry, for the Service of the Year One thousand seven hundred and eighty.	The whole act.
20 Geo. 3. c. 4	Continuance of Laws Act 1780	An Act for continuing an Act, made in the last Session of Parliament, for allowing the Importation of fine organzined Italian Thrown Silk in any Ships or Vessels for a limited Time.	The whole act.
20 Geo. 3. c. 5	Habeas Corpus Suspension Act 1780	An Act the title of which begins with the words,—An Act for further continuing an Act, made in the Seventeenth Year,—and ends with the words,—Crime of Piracy.	The whole act.
20 Geo. 3. c. 6	Trade Act 1780	An Act to repeal certain Acts made in Great Britain, which restrain the Trade and Commerce of Ireland with Foreign Parts.	The whole act.
20 Geo. 3. c. 12	Mutiny Act 1780	An Act for punishing Mutiny and Desertion; and for the better Payment of the Army and their Quarters.	The whole act.
20 Geo. 3. c. 13	Marine Mutiny Act 1780	An Act for the Regulation of His Majesty's Marine Forces while on Shore.	The whole act.
20 Geo. 3. c. 14	Militia Pay Act 1780	An Act for defraying the Charge of the Pay and Cloathing of the Militia in that Part of Great Britain called England, for One Year, beginning the Twenty-fifth Day of March, One thousand seven hundred and eighty.	The whole act.
20 Geo. 3. c. 17	Parliamentary Elections Act 1780	An Act to remove certain Difficulties relative to Voters at County Elections.	Except Section Twelve to "profits of such flower."
20 Geo. 3. c. 18	Trade with Ireland Act 1780	An Act the title of which begins with the words,—An Act to repeal so much of an Act made in the Nineteenth Year,—and ends with the words,— Merchants of England trading to the Levant Seas.	The whole act.
20 Geo. 3. c. 19	Continuance of Laws (No. 2) Act 1780	An Act the title of which begins with the words,—An Act to continue several Laws relating to the better securing the lawful Trade,—and ends with the words,—British Sugar Colonies or Plantations in the West Indies.	The whole act.
20 Geo. 3. c. 20	Supply of Seamen Act 1780	An Act for the better Supply of Mariners and Seamen to serve in His Majesty's Ships of War, and on Board Merchant Ships, and other Trading Ships and Vessels.	The whole act.
20 Geo. 3. c. 25	Customs (No. 2) Act 1780	An Act for repealing the Duties payable upon Pot and Pearl Ashes, Wood and Weed Ashes, imported into Great Britain, and for granting other Duties in lieu thereof, for a limited Time.	The whole act.
20 Geo. 3. c. 28	Stamp Duties Act 1780	An Act for granting to His Majesty several additional Duties on Advertisements; and certain Duties on Receipts for Legacies, or for any Share of a Personal Estate divided by force of the Statute of Distributions, or the Custom of any Province or Place.	The whole act.
20 Geo. 3. c. 29	Trade (No. 3) Act 1780	An Act to protect Goods or Merchandize, of the Growth, Produce, or Manufacture of the Islands of Grenada, and the Grenadines, on Board Neutral Vessels bound to Neutral Ports, during the present Hostilities.	The whole act.
20 Geo. 3. c. 31	Bounty on Corn Act 1780	An Act for allowing a Bounty on the Exportation of British Corn and Grain, in Ships the Property of Persons of any Kingdom or State in Amity with His Majesty.	The whole act.
20 Geo. 3. c. 33	Rolls Estate Act 1780	An Act the title of which begins with the words,—An Act to explain and amend an Act made in the Seventeenth Year,—and ends with the words,— Method of making Leases of the said Estate for the future.	The whole act.
20 Geo. 3. c. 36	Poor Apprentices Act 1780	An Act the title of which begins with the words,—An Act for regulating Houses of Industry within such Hundreds or Districts, touching the binding and receiving of poor Children Apprentices,—and ends with the words,—Houses of Industry within such Hundreds or Districts.	The whole act.
20 Geo. 3. c. 39	Tobacco Act 1780	An Act to admit to an Entry in this Kingdom, under certain Restrictions, Tobacco imported not directly from the Place of its Growth or Produce, and for granting an Additional Duty on such Tobacco, during the present Hostilities.	The whole act.
20 Geo. 3. c. 40	Completion of Somerset House Act 1780	An Act the title of which begins with the words,—An Act to repeal so much of an Act, made in the fifteenth Year,—and ends with the words,—Offices to be erected and established by virtue of the said Act.	The whole act.
20 Geo. 3. c. 41	Payment of Creditors (Scotland) Act 1780	An Act the title of which begins with the words,—An Act to continue an Act, made in the Twelfth Year,—and ends with the words,—Promissory Notes, in that Part of Great Britain called Scotland.	The whole act.
20 Geo. 3. c. 43	Loans or Exchequer Bills Act 1780	An Act for raising a certain Sum of Money by Loans or Exchequer Bills, for the Service of the Year One thousand seven hundred and eighty.	The whole act.
20 Geo. 3. c. 45	Importation, etc. Act 1780	An Act the title of which begins with the words,—An Act to permit Goods, the Produce or Manufacture of certain Places within the Levant,—and ends with the words,—Foreign Ships or Vessels for a limited Time.	The whole act.
20 Geo. 3. c. 46	Exportation Act 1780	An Act the title of which begins with the words,—An Act to allow the Exportation of Provisions,—and ends with the words,—Parts of His Majesty's Dominions.	The whole act.
20 Geo. 3. c. 50	Parliament (No. 2) Act 1780	An Act the title of which begins with the words,—An Act for exempting the City of Winchester,—and ends with the words,—Elections of Members to serve in Parliament for a limited Time.	The whole act.
20 Geo. 3. c. 53	Loans or Exchequer Bills (No. 2) Act 1780	An Act for raising a further Sum of Money, by Loans or Exchequer Bills, for the Service of the Year One thousand seven hundred and eighty.	The whole act.
20 Geo. 3. c. 54	Audit of Public Accounts Act 1780	An Act the title of which begins with the words,—An Act for appointing and enabling Commissioners to examine, take,—and ends with the words,— Benefit of the Publick.	The whole act.
20 Geo. 3. c. 55	Wool Act 1780	An Act to repeal so much of an Act, made in the Thirteenth and Fourteenth Years of the Reign of King Charles the Second, as restrains the Removal of Wool and other Articles, to certain Times and Hours therein mentioned.	The whole act.
20 Geo. 3. c. 56	East India Company (No. 1) Act 1780	An Act the title of which begins with the words,—An Act for continuing in the Possession of the United Company of Merchants of England,—and ends with the words,—Three Ships of the Line for the Service of the Publick.	The whole act.
20 Geo. 3. c. 57	Loans or Exchequer Bills (No. 3) Act 1780	An Act for enabling His Majesty to raise the Sum of One Million, for the Uses and Purposes therein mentioned.	The whole act.
20 Geo. 3. c. 58	East India Company (No. 2) Act 1780	An Act for granting further Time for allowing the Drawback on the Exportation of Coffee imported by the East India Company, in the Ship Europa, in the Year One thousand seven hundred and seventy-five.	The whole act.
20 Geo. 3. c. 59	Exportations, etc. Act 1780	An Act to empower His Majesty to prohibit the Exportation, and to restrain the carrying Coastwise, of Copper in Bars, or Copper in Sheets, for a limited Time.	The whole act.
20 Geo. 3. c. 61	Finding of the Longitude at Sea Act 1780	An Act for continuing the Encouragement and Reward of Persons making certain Discoveries for finding the Longitude at Sea, or making other useful Discoveries and Improvements in Navigation, and for making Experiments relating thereto.	The whole act.
20 Geo. 3. c. 62	Appropriation Act 1780	An Act the title of which begins with the words,—An Act for granting to His Majesty a certain Sum of Money out of the Sinking Fund,—and ends with the words,—Supplies granted in this Session of Parliament.	The whole act.
20 Geo. 3. c. 63	Indemnity, Suppression of Riots Act 1780	An Act to indemnify such Persons as have acted in the Suppression of the late Riots and Tumults, in and about the Cities of London and Westminster, and Borough of Southwark, and for the Preservation of the public Peace.	The whole act.
20 Geo. 3. c. 64	Release of Prisoners by Rioters Act 1780	An Act the title of which begins with the words,—An Act to prevent any Mischief,—and ends with the words,—set at Liberty during the late Tumults and Insurrection.	The whole act.
21 Geo. 3. c. 1	Destruction of Prisons by Rioters Act 1781	An Act the title of which begins with the words,—An Act to extend the Provisions contained in an Act passed in the last Session,—and ends with the words,—Prisons substituted in lieu thereof.	The whole act.
21 Geo. 3. c. 2	Habeas Corpus Suspension Act 1781	An Act the title of which begins with the words,—An Act for further continuing an Act, made in the Seventeenth Year,—and ends with the words,—Crime of Piracy.	The whole act.
21 Geo. 3. c. 3	Land Tax Act 1781	An Act for granting an Aid to His Majesty by a Land Tax, to be raised in Great Britain, for the Service of the Year One thousand seven hundred and eighty-one.	The whole act.
21 Geo. 3. c. 4	Malt Duties Act 1781	An Act for continuing and granting to His Majesty certain Duties upon Malt, Mum, Cyder, and Perry, for the Service of the Year One thousand seven hundred and eighty-one.	The whole act.
21 Geo. 3. c. 6	Importation Act 1781	An Act for further continuing an Act, made in the Nineteenth Year of the Reign of His present Majesty, for allowing the Importation of fine organzined Italian Thrown Silk in any Ships or Vessels, for a limited Time.	The whole act.
21 Geo. 3. c. 8	Mutiny Act 1781	An Act for punishing Mutiny and Desertion; and for the better Payment of the Army and their Quarters.	The whole act.
21 Geo. 3. c. 9	Marine Mutiny Act 1781	An Act for the Regulation of His Majesty's Marine Forces while on Shore.	The whole act.
21 Geo. 3. c. 11	Navy, etc. Act 1781	An Act for the better Supply of Mariners and Seamen to serve in His Majesty's Ships of War, and on Board Merchant Ships, and other Trading Ships and Vessels.	The whole act.
21 Geo. 3. c. 18	Militia (No. 2) Act 1781	An Act for keeping the Militia Forces of this Kingdom complete, during the Time therein mentioned.	The whole act.
21 Geo. 3. c. 19	Navigation Act 1781	An Act to permit the Importation of Flax and Flax Seed into this Kingdom or Ireland, in any Ship or Vessel belonging to any Kingdom or State in Amity with His Majesty, navigated with Foreign Mariners, during the present Hostilities.	The whole act.
21 Geo. 3. c. 21	Militia Pay Act 1781	An Act for defraying the Charge of the Pay and Cloathing of the Militia in that Part of Great Britain called England, for One Year, beginning the Twenty-fifth Day of March, One thousand seven hundred and eighty-one.	The whole act.
21 Geo. 3. c. 23	Land Tax (Commissioners) Act 1781	An Act the title of which begins with the words,—An Act for appointing Commissioners for putting in execution an Act of this Session,—and ends with the words,—One thousand seven hundred and eighty-one.	The whole act.
21 Geo. 3. c. 26	Importation (No. 2) Act 1781	An Act the title of which begins with the words,—An Act to permit Goods, the Product or Manufacture of certain Places within the Levant,—and ends with the words,—Foreign Ships or Vessels during the present Hostilities.	The whole act.
21 Geo. 3. c. 27	Importation (No. 3) Act 1781	An Act the title of which begins with the words,—An Act to permit, during the present Hostilities, Importation,—and ends with the words,—Neutral Ships and Vessels.	The whole act.
21 Geo. 3. c. 29	Continuance of Laws Act 1781	An Act the title of which begins with the words,—An Act to continue several Laws relating to the opening and establishing certain free Ports,—and ends with the words,—Exportation of British Corn and Grain in Neutral Ships.	The whole act.
21 Geo. 3. c. 40	Bounties Act 1781	An Act the title of which begins with the words,—An Act for extending the Provisions of Three Acts,—and ends with the words,—Importation of that Species of Blue called Smalts.	The whole act.
21 Geo. 3. c. 41	Loans or Exchequer Bills Act 1781	An Act for raising a certain Sum of Money, by Loans or Exchequer Bills, for the Service of the Year One thousand seven hundred and eighty-one.	The whole act.
21 Geo. 3. c. 42	Loans or Exchequer Bills (No. 2) Act 1781	An Act for raising a further Sum of Money, by Loans or Exchequer Bills, for the Service of the Year One thousand seven hundred and eighty-one.	The whole act.
21 Geo. 3. c. 43	Parliament Act 1781	An Act the title of which begins with the words,—An Act for continuing an Act made in the Twentieth Year,—and ends with the words,—Elections of Members to serve in Parliament, for a limited Time.	The whole act.
21 Geo. 3. c. 45	Audit of Public Accounts Act 1781	An Act the title of which begins with the words,—An Act for continuing and amending an Act made in the last Session,—and ends with the words,— Services as in future be regulated and carried on for the Benefit of the Publick.	The whole act.
21 Geo. 3. c. 48	Paymaster-general, Balance, etc. Act 1781	An Act the title of which begins with the words,—An Act to direct the Payment into the Exchequer of the respective Balances,—and ends with the words,—and for other Purposes therein mentioned.	The whole act.
21 Geo. 3. c. 52	Finding of the Longitude at Sea Act 1781	An Act for continuing the Encouragement and reward of Persons making certain Discoveries for finding the Longitude at Sea, or making other useful Discoveries and Improvements in Navigation, and for making Experiments relating thereto.	The whole act.
21 Geo. 3. c. 55	Excise Act 1781	An Act the title of which begins with the words,—An Act for repealing the Duties payable upon Chocolate,—and ends with the words,—Two Pounds per Centum upon the Duties of Excise imposed by the said Act.	The whole act.
21 Geo. 3. c. 57	Appropriation Act 1781	An Act the title of which begins with the words,—An Act for granting to His Majesty a certain Sum of Money out of the Sinking Fund,—and ends with the words,—Supplies granted in this Session of Parliament.	The whole act.
21 Geo. 3. c. 58	Growth of Hemp and Flax Act 1781	An Act the title of which begins with the words,—An Act for rendering more effectual so much of an Act, made in the Tenth Year,—and ends with the words,—Purposes aforesaid, for a Time limited.	The whole act.
21 Geo. 3. c. 59	Loans or Exchequer Bills (No. 3) Act 1781	An Act for enabling His Majesty to raise the Sum of One Million, for the Uses and Purposes therein mentioned.	The whole act.
21 Geo. 3. c. 63	Insolvent Debtors Relief Act 1781	An Act for the Discharge of certain Insolvent Debtors.	The whole act.
21 Geo. 3. c. 64	Excise (No. 2) Act 1781	An Act the title of which begins with the words,—An Act to rectify a Mistake in an Act, made in this present Session,—and ends with the words,—Five Pounds per Centum upon the Duties of Excise imposed by the said Act.	The whole act.
21 Geo. 3. c. 66	Clergy Residences Repair Act 1780	An Act the title of which begins with the words,—An Act to explain and amend an Act, made in the Seventeenth Year,—and ends with the words,—Use of their Benefices.	Section One.
21 Geo. 3. c. 67	Driving of Cattle, Metropolis Act 1781	An Act to prevent the Mischiefs that arise from Driving Cattle within the Cities of London and Westminster, and Liberties thereof, and Bills of Mortality.	The whole act.
22 Geo. 3. c. 1	Habeas Corpus Suspension Act 1782	An Act the title of which begins with the words,—An Act for further continuing an Act, made in the Seventeenth Year,—and ends with the words,— Crime of Piracy.	The whole act.
22 Geo. 3. c. 2	Land Tax Act 1782	An Act for granting an Aid to His Majesty by a Land Tax, to be raised in Great Britain, for the Service of the Year One thousand seven hundred and eighty-two.	The whole act.
22 Geo. 3. c. 3	Malt Duties Act 1782	An Act for continuing and granting to His Majesty certain Duties upon Malt, Mum, Cyder, and Perry, for the Service of the Year One thousand seven hundred and eighty-two.	The whole act.
22 Geo. 3. c. 4	Mutiny Act 1782	An Act for punishing Mutiny and Desertion; and for the better Payment of the Army and their Quarters.	The whole act.
22 Geo. 3. c. 5	Marine Mutiny Act 1782	An Act for the Regulation of His Majesty's Marine Forces while on Shore.	The whole act.
22 Geo. 3. c. 6	Militia Act 1782	An Act for keeping the Militia Forces of this Kingdom complete, during the Time therein mentioned.	The whole act.
22 Geo. 3. c. 7	Importation Act 1782	An Act for further continuing an Act, made in the Nineteenth Year of the Reign of His present Majesty, for allowing the Importation of fine organzined Italian Thrown Silk in any Ships or Vessels, for a limited Time.	The whole act.
22 Geo. 3. c. 9	Land Tax (Commissioners) Act 1782	An Act the title of which begins with the words,—An Act for rectifying Mistakes in the Names of several of the Commissioners,—and ends with the words,—Service of the Year One thousand seven hundred and eighty-two.	The whole act.
22 Geo. 3. c. 10	Exchange of American Prisoners Act 1782	An Act for the better detaining, and more easy Exchange of American Prisoners brought into Great Britain.	The whole act.
22 Geo. 3. c. 11	Negotiations of Certain Bonds Act 1782	An Act the title of which begins with the words,—An Act for allowing further Time to negotiate, by Indorsement,—and ends with the words,— Firm of Douglas, Heron, and Company.	The whole act.
22 Geo. 3. c. 13	Continuance of Laws Act 1782	An Act the title of which begins with the words,—An Act to continue several Laws therein mentioned,—and ends with the words,—His Majesty's Sugar Colonies in America.	The whole act.
22 Geo. 3. c. 16	Navigation Act 1782	An Act for the better Supply of Mariners and Seamen to serve in His Majesty's Ships of War, and on Board Merchant Ships, and other trading Ships and Vessels.	The whole act.
22 Geo. 3. c. 19	Greenland, etc., Fishery Act 1782	An Act for granting an additional Bounty on Ships employed in the Greenland and Whale Fishery, for a limited Time.	The whole act.
22 Geo. 3. c. 20	Customs Act 1782	An Act to revive and further continue an Act, made in the Seventh Year of the Reign of His present Majesty, intituled An Act to discontinue, for a limited Time, the Duties payable upon the Importation of Tallow, Hog's Lard, and Grease.	The whole act.
22 Geo. 3. c. 23	Papists Act 1782	An Act for allowing further Time for Inrollment of Deeds and Wills made by Papists, and for Relief of Protestant Purchasers.	The whole act.
22 Geo. 3. c. 24	Militia Pay Act 1782	An Act for defraying the Charge of the Pay and Cloathing of the Militia in that Part of Great Britain called England, for One Year, beginning the Twenty-fifth Day of March, One thousand seven hundred and eighty-two.	The whole act.
22 Geo. 3. c. 26	Quarters for Certain Troops Act 1782	An Act for providing Quarters for certain Foreign Troops, lately employed in His Majesty's Service in the Defence of the Island of Minorca, and expected to arrive soon in this Kingdom, for a limited Time.	The whole act.
22 Geo. 3. c. 29	Parliament (No. 1) Act 1782	An Act the title of which begins with the words,—An Act for further continuing an Act, made in the Twentieth Year,—and ends with the words,— Elections of Members to serve in Parliament, for a limited Time.	The whole act.
22 Geo. 3. c. 36	Loans or Exchequer Bills Act 1782	An Act for raising a further Sum of Money, by Loans or Exchequer Bills, for the Service of the Year One thousand seven hundred and eighty-two.	The whole act.
22 Geo. 3. c. 38	Importation (No. 3) Act 1782	An Act to permit the Importation of British Plantation Tobacco from any Port or Place either in America, or the West Indies, or in Europe, during the present Hostilities.	The whole act.
22 Geo. 3. c. 45	House of Commons (Disqualification) Act 1782	An Act for restraining any Person concerned in any Contract, Commission, or Agreement, made for the Publick Service, from being elected, or sitting and voting as a Member of the House of Commons.	Sections Four, Five, Seven, and Eight.
22 Geo. 3. c. 46	Truce with America Act 1782	An Act to enable His Majesty to conclude a Peace or Truce with certain Colonies in North America therein mentioned.	The whole act.
22 Geo. 3. c. 50	Audit of Public Accounts Act 1782	An Act the title of which begins with the words,—An Act for further continuing an Act, made in the Twentieth Year,—and ends with the words,—Benefit of the Publick.	The whole act.
22 Geo. 3. c. 51	East India Company Act 1782	An Act the title of which begins with the words,—An Act to discharge and indemnify the United Company of Merchants of England,—and ends with the words,—Eight Pounds per Centum to the Proprietors of their Stock for the present Year.	The whole act.
22 Geo. 3. c. 53	Repeal of Act for Securing Dependence of Ireland Act 1782	An Act to repeal an Act, made in the Sixth Year of the Reign of His late Majesty King George the First, intituled An Act for the better securing the Dependency of the Kingdom of Ireland upon the Crown of Great Britain.	The whole act.
22 Geo. 3. c. 54	Sir Thomas Rumbold and another Act 1782	An Act for restraining Sir Thomas Rumbold, Baronet, and Peter Perring, Esquire, from going out of this Kingdom, for a limited Time; and for discovering their Estates and Effects, and preventing the transporting or alienating the same.	The whole act.
22 Geo. 3. c. 59	Sir Thomas Rumbold and another (No. 2) Act 1782	An Act the title of which begins with the words,—An Act to provide that the Proceedings on the Bill, now depending in Parliament,—and ends with the words,—shall not be discontinued by any Prorogation or Dissolution of the Parliament.	The whole act.
22 Geo. 3. c. 63	Use of Highland Dress Act 1782	An Act to repeal so much of an Act, made in the Nineteenth Year of King George the Second (for the more effectual disarming the Highlands in Scotland, and for the other Purposes therein mentioned), as restrains the Use of the Highland Dress.	The whole act.
22 Geo. 3. c. 67	Appropriation Act 1782	An Act the title of which begins with the words,—An Act for granting to His Majesty a certain Sum of Money out of the Sinking Fund,—and ends with the words,—Supplies granted in this Session of Parliament.	The whole act.
22 Geo. 3. c. 71	Supply of Ships to Enemies Act 1782	An Act more effectually to prevent His Majesty's Enemies from being supplied with Ships or Vessels from Great Britain.	The whole act.
22 Geo. 3. c. 72	Importation Act (No. 4) 1782	An Act for continuing so much of an Act of the Sixth Year of His present Majesty, as relates to prohibiting the Importation of Foreign Wrought Silks and Velvets.	The whole act.
22 Geo. 3. c. 73	Tobacco Act 1782	An Act the title of which begins with the words,—An Act to explain an Act made in the Twelfth Year,—and ends with the words,—Tobacco, the Growth of Scotland, into England, for a limited Time, under certain Restrictions.	Section Two to end of Act.
22 Geo. 3. c. 74	First Meetings of Commissioners etc. Act 1782	An Act for enlarging the Times appointed for the First Meetings of Commissioners, or other Persons for putting in Execution certain Acts of this Session of Parliament.	The whole act.
22 Geo. 3. c. 75	Colonial Leave of Absence Act 1782	An Act the title of which begins with the words,—An Act to prevent hereafter in future any Patent Office,—and ends with the words,—discharge the Duty thereof in Person, and behave well therein.	Section One. Repealed as to all Her Majesty's Dominions.
22 Geo. 3. c. 76	Loans of Exchequer Bills Act 1782	An Act for enabling His Majesty to raise the Sum of One Million, for the Uses and Purposes therein mentioned.	The whole act.
22 Geo. 3. c. 79	Volunteers Act 1782	An Act for the Encouragement and Disciplining of such Corps or Companies of Men as shall voluntarily enroll themselves for Defence of their Towns or Coasts, or for the general Defence of the Kingdom, during the present War.	The whole act.
22 Geo. 3. c. 82	Civil List and Secret Service Money Act 1782	An Act the title of which begins with the words,—An Act for enabling His Majesty to discharge the Debt, contracted,—and ends with the words,—Revenues of the Civil List.	Sections One, Three, Six to Twelve, and Eighteen.
22 Geo. 3. c. 83	Relief of the Poor Act 1782	An Act for the better Relief and Employment of the Poor.	The whole act.
23 Geo. 3. c. 1	Importation Act 1783	An Act to permit the Importation of Wheat, Wheat Flour, Rye, Rye Flour, Barley, and all sorts of Corn, Grain, and Meal, upon Payment of the low Duties therein mentioned, for a limited Time.	The whole act.
23 Geo. 3. c. 2	Supply of Ships to Enemies Act 1783	An Act to continue an Act made in the last Session of Parliament, intituled An Act more effectually to prevent His Majesty's Enemies from being supplied with Ships or Vessels from Great Britain.	The whole act.
23 Geo. 3. c. 3	Land Tax Act 1783	An Act for granting an Aid to His Majesty by a Land Tax, to be raised in Great Britain, for the service of the Year One thousand seven hundred and eighty-three.	The whole act.
23 Geo. 3. c. 4	Malt Duties Act 1783	An Act for continuing and granting to His Majesty certain Duties upon Malt, Mum, Cyder, and Perry, for the Service of the Year One thousand seven hundred and eighty-three.	The whole act.
23 Geo. 3. c. 5	Sir Thomas Rumbold and another Act 1783	An Act the title of which begins with the words,—An Act for continuing an Act passed in the Twenty-second Year,—and ends with the words,—preventing the transporting or alienating the same.	The whole act.
23 Geo. 3. c. 6	Continuance of Laws Act 1783	An Act the title of which begins with the words,—An Act to continue several Laws relating to the regulating the Fees,—and ends with the words,— granting other Duties in lieu thereof.	The whole act.
23 Geo. 3. c. 7	Marine Mutiny Act 1783	An Act for the Regulation of His Majesty's Marine Forces while on Shore.	The whole act.
23 Geo. 3. c. 9	Importation (No. 2) Act 1783	An Act for allowing the Importation of Rice, Paddy, and Indian Corn, Indian Meal, and Maize, free from Duty, for a limited Time.	The whole act.
23 Geo. 3. c. 10	Importation (Italian Silk) Act 1783	An Act for further continuing an Act, made in the Nineteenth Year of the Reign of His present Majesty, for allowing the Importation of fine organzined Italian Thrown Silk in any Ships or Vessels, for a limited Time.	The whole act.
23 Geo. 3. c. 12	Loans or Exchequer Bills Act 1783	An Act for raising a certain Sum of Money, by Loans or Exchequer Bills, for the Service of the Year One thousand seven hundred and eighty-three.	The whole act.
23 Geo. 3. c. 14	Importation (No. 4) Act 1783	An Act the title of which begins with the words,—An Act for allowing the Importation of Goods from Europe in Neutral Ships,—and ends with the words,—His Majesty's Dominions in Europe or America. Repealed as to all Her Majesty's Dominions.	The whole act.
23 Geo. 3. c. 15	Dyeing Trade (Frauds) Act 1783	An Act for rendering more effectual the Provisions contained in an Act of the Thirteenth Year of King George the First, for preventing Frauds and Abuses in the Dying Trade.	Section One.
23 Geo. 3. c. 16	Bounty to Garrison of Gibraltar Act 1783	An Act the title of which begins with the words,—An Act for authorizing the Treasurer of the Navy to pay to the Garrison,—and ends with the words,— destroying Ships of War belonging to the Enemy.	The whole act.
23 Geo. 3. c. 17	Mutiny Act 1783	An Act for punishing Mutiny and Desertion; and for the better Payment of the Army and their Quarters.	The whole act.
23 Geo. 3. c. 18	Payment of Creditors (Scotland) Act 1783	An Act the title of which begins with the words,—An Act for rendering the Payment of Creditors more equal,—and ends with the words,—Bills and Promissory Notes.	The whole act.
23 Geo. 3. c. 19	John Whitehill, Esquire Act 1783	An Act the title of which begins with the words,—An Act for repealing an Act, made in the last Session,—and ends with the words,—his Estate and Effects, and preventing the transporting or alienating the same.	The whole act.
23 Geo. 3. c. 21	Bounties Act 1783	An Act for granting a Bounty upon the Exportation of British and Irish Buckrams and Tillettings, British and Irish Linens, British Callicoes and Cottons, or Cotton mixed with Linen, printed, painted, stained, or dyed in Great Britain.	The whole act.
23 Geo. 3. c. 22	Papists Act 1783	An Act for allowing further Time for Inrollment of Deeds and Wills made by Papists, and for Relief of Protestant Purchasers.	The whole act.
23 Geo. 3. c. 24	Mutiny (No. 2) Act 1783	An Act for continuing an Act made in this Session of Parliament, intituled An Act for punishing Mutiny and Desertion, and for the better Payment of the Army and their Quarters; so far as the same relates to the Realm of Great Britain.	The whole act.
23 Geo. 3. c. 26	Trade with America Act 1783	An Act to repeal so much of Two Acts, made in the Sixteenth and Seventeenth Years of the Reign of His present Majesty, as prohibits Trade and Intercourse with the United States of America.	The whole act.
23 Geo. 3. c. 28	Irish Appeals Act 1783	An Act the title of which begins with the words,—An Act for removing and preventing all doubts,—and ends with the words,—His Majesty's Courts in the Kingdom of Great Britain.	Section Two from " and that all Records " to end of that Section.
23 Geo. 3. c. 37	Recruiting Act 1783	An Act the title of which begins with the words,—An Act to repeal an Act, made in the Twentieth Year,—and ends with the words,—relates to the Encouragement of Volunteers.	The whole act.
23 Geo. 3. c. 39	Trade with America (No. 2) Act 1783	An Act the title of which begins with the words,—An Act for preventing certain Instruments from being required from Ships,—and ends with the words,—Inhabitants of the said United States.	The whole act.
23 Geo. 3. c. 40	Militia Pay Act 1783	An Act the title of which begins with the words,—An Act for defraying the Charge of the Pay of the Militia,—and ends with the words,—One thousand seven hundred and eighty-three.	The whole act.
23 Geo. 3. c. 45	Justiciary and Circuit Courts (Scotland) Act 1783	An Act for regulating the Proceedings of the Court of Justiciary, and Circuit Courts, in Scotland.	The last two Sections.
23 Geo. 3. c. 51	Egyptians Act 1783	An Act to repeal an Act, made in the Fifth Year of the Reign of Queen Elizabeth, intituled An Act for the Punishment of Vagabonds calling themselves Egyptians.	The whole act.
23 Geo. 3. c. 52	Mutiny (No. 3) Act 1783	An Act for punishing Mutiny and Desertion; and for the better Payment of the Army and their Quarters, within the Realm of Great Britain.	The whole act.
23 Geo. 3. c. 53	Failure of Corn Crop (Scotland) Act 1783	An Act the title of which begins with the words,—An Act to enable the Commissioners of Supply of the several Counties,—and ends with the words,— Vessels belonging to any State in Amity with His Majesty, navigated by Foreign Seamen.	The whole act.
23 Geo. 3. c. 59	Sir Thomas Rumbold and another (No. 2) Act 1783	An Act the title of which begins with the words,—An Act to provide that the Proceedings on the Bill, now depending in Parliament,—and ends with the words,—shall not be discontinued by any Prorogation or Dissolution of Parliament.	The whole act.
23 Geo. 3. c. 60	Sir Thomas Rumbold and another (No. 3) Act 1783	An Act the title of which begins with the words,—An Act for further continuing so much of an Act, passed in the Twenty-second Year,—and ends with the words,—alienating or otherwise disposing of their respective Real Estates.	The whole act.
23 Geo. 3. c. 64	Malt Duties (No. 2) Act 1783	An Act for taking away from the Commissioners of Excise, in England and Scotland, the Power of compounding with Persons making Malt for Sale, not to be consumed in their own private Families.	The whole act.
23 Geo. 3. c. 68	Auditing of the Public Accounts Act 1783	An Act for appointing and enabling Commissioners further to examine, take, and state the publick Accounts of the Kingdom.	The whole act.
23 Geo. 3. c. 70	Excise Act 1783	An Act the title of which begins with the words,—An Act for the more effectual preventing the illegal Importation of foreign Spirits,—and ends with the words,—Officers of Excise acting in pursuance of the Authority given by Excise Statutes.	The whole act.
23 Geo. 3. c. 72	Loans or Exchequer Bills (No. 2) Act 1783	An Act for raising a further Sum of Money, by Loans or Exchequer Bills, for the Service of the Year One thousand seven hundred and eighty-three.	The whole act.
23 Geo. 3. c. 74	Customs (No. 3) Act 1783	An Act for altering the Duties and Drawbacks upon plain Muslins, unrated Muslins and Callicoes, and Nankeen Cloths.	The whole act.
23 Geo. 3. c. 78	Appropriation Act 1783	An Act the title of which begins with the words,—An Act for granting to His Majesty a certain Sum of Money out of the Sinking Fund,—and ends with the words,—Supplies granted in this Session of Parliament.	The whole act.
23 Geo. 3. c. 80	American Loyalists Act 1783	An Act the title of which begins with the words,—An Act for appointing Commissioners to enquire into the Losses,—and ends with the words,—Attachment to the British Government.	The whole act.
23 Geo. 3. c. 81	Exportation Act 1783	An Act for permitting the Exportation of Corn, Grain, or Meal, with a Bounty, during the Operation of Two Acts, passed in this present Session of Parliament, for allowing the Importation of Corn.	The whole act.
23 Geo. 3. c. 84	Loans or Exchequer Bills (No. 3) Act 1783	An Act to enable His Majesty to raise a further sum of Money by Loans or Exchequer Bills, to pay off and discharge the Debts due and owing on the Civil List.	The whole act.
23 Geo. 3. c. 85	Annuity to Sir George Augustus Elliott Act 1783	An Act the title of which begins with the words,—An Act for settling and securing a certain Annuity,—and ends with the words,—Services performed by him to His Majesty and this Country.	The whole act.
23 Geo. 3. c. 86	Annuity to Lord Rodney Act 1783	An Act the title of which begins with the words,—An Act for settling and securing a certain Annuity on George Lord Rodney,—and ends with the words,—His Majesty and the Publick.	The whole act.
24 Geo. 3. Sess. 1. c. 1	Malt Duties (No. 3) Act 1783	An Act for continuing and granting to His Majesty certain Duties upon Malt, Mum, Cyder, and Perry, for the Service of the Year One thousand seven hundred and eighty-four.	The whole act.
24 Geo. 3. Sess. 1. c. 2	Trade with America (No. 3) Act 1783	An Act the title of which begins with the words,—An Act to continue, for a limited Time, an Act made in the last Session,—and ends with the words,— His Majesty's Dominions, and the Inhabitants of the said United States.	The whole act.
24 Geo. 3. Sess. 1. c. 3	East India Company (No. 3) Act 1783	An Act to continue so much of an Act made in the last Session of Parliament, as allows further Time for the Payment of certain Sums due, and to become due to the Publick, from the United Company of Merchants of England trading to the East Indies.	The whole act.
24 Geo. 3. Sess. 1. c. 4	Land Tax (No. 2) Act 1783	An Act for granting an Aid to His Majesty by a Land Tax, to be raised in Great Britain, for the Service of the Year One thousand seven hundred and eighty-four.	The whole act.
24 Geo. 3. Sess. 1. c. 10	Land Tax (No. 3) Act 1783	An Act the title of which begins with the words,—An Act for appointing Commissioners to put in Execution an Act of this Session,—and ends with the words,—One thousand seven hundred and eighty-three.	The whole act.
24 Geo. 3. Sess. 1. c. 11	Mutiny (No. 4) Act 1783	An Act for punishing Mutiny and Desertion; and for the better Payment of the Army and their Quarters.	The whole act.
24 Geo. 3. Sess. 1. c. 14	Exportation Act 1783	An Act the title of which begins with the words,—An Act to continue the Provisions of an Act of the Twenty-third,—and ends with the words,—for a limited Time.	The whole act.
24 Geo. 3. Sess. 1. c. 15	Trade with America (No. 4) Act 1783	An Act the title of which begins with the words,—An Act for further continuing, for a limited Time, an Act made in the last Session,—and ends with the words,—Inhabitants of the said United States.	The whole act.
24 Geo. 3. Sess. 1. c. 16	Papists (No. 2) Act 1783	An Act for allowing further Time for Inrollment of Deeds and Wills made by Papists, and for Relief of Protestant Purchasers.	The whole act.
24 Geo. 3. Sess. 1. c. 17	Marine Mutiny (No. 2) Act 1783	An Act for the Regulation of His Majesty's Marine Forces while on Shore.	The whole act.
24 Geo. 3. Sess. 1. c. 19	Isle of Wight (Carriage Rates) Act 1783	An Act for settling the Rates for the Carriage of Passengers and Goods for Hire to and from the Isle of Wight.	Section Ten.
24 Geo. 3. Sess. 2. c. 1	Trade with America Act 1784	An Act the title of which begins with the words,—An Act for further continuing, for a limited Time, an Act made in the Twenty-third Year,— and ends with the words,—Inhabitants of the said United States.	The whole act.
24 Geo. 3. Sess. 2. c. 2	East India Company (No. 1) Act 1784	An Act to impower the East India Company to make a Dividend to the Proprietors of East India Stock, at Midsummer, One thousand seven hundred and eighty-four.	The whole act.
24 Geo. 3. Sess. 2. c. 6	Exercise of Trade by Soldiers, etc. Act 1784	An Act to enable such Officers, Mariners, and Soldiers, as have been in the Land or Sea Service, or in the Marines, or in the Corps of Royal Artillery or Fencible Men, since the Second Year of His present Majesty's Reign, to exercise Trades.	The whole act.
24 Geo. 3. Sess. 2. c. 7	Customs, etc. Act 1784	An Act the title of which begins with the words,—An Act for explaining certain Acts of the Parliament of Scotland,—and ends with the words,—Compensation in lieu thereof.	The whole act.
24 Geo. 3. Sess. 2. c. 9	Customs Act 1784	An Act to authorise the Commissioners of the Customs in England and Scotland to cancel Bonds, given for the High Duties on certain Parcels of Corn imported into Great Britain, on certain Conditions therein mentioned.	The whole act.
24 Geo. 3. Sess. 2. c. 13	Audit of Public Accounts Act 1784	An Act for appointing and enabling Commissioners further to examine, take, and state the Publick Accounts of the Kingdom.	The whole act.
24 Geo. 3. Sess. 2. c. 16	Customs (No. 2) Act 1784	An Act the title of which begins with the words,—An Act to discontinue the Petty Custom on Aliens Goods,—and ends with the words,—British Colonies or Plantations in America.	The whole act.
24 Geo. 3. Sess. 2. c. 19	Manufacture of Leather Act 1784	An Act the title of which begins with the words,—An Act to revive and continue an Act made in the Twelfth Year,—and ends with the words,—Part of Great Britain called Scotland.	The whole act.
24 Geo. 3. Sess. 2. c. 21	Hat Manufacture Act 1784	An Act the title of which begins with the words,—An Act for the Preservation and Encouragement of the Hat Manufactory,—and ends with the words,— Importation of Goats Hair into this Kingdom Duty-free.	The whole act.
24 Geo. 3. Sess. 2. c. 23	Trade with America (No. 2) Act 1784	An Act the title of which begins with the words,—An Act for further continuing, for a limited Time, an Act made in the Twenty-third Year,— and ends with the words,—Inhabitants of the said United States.	The whole act.
24 Geo. 3. Sess. 2. c. 26	Recess Elections Act 1784	An Act the title of which begins with the words,—An Act to repeal so much of Two Acts made in the Tenth and Fifteenth Years,—and ends with the words,—substituting other Provisions for the like Purposes.	Section One.
24 Geo. 3. Sess. 2. c. 28	Bounty for Taking L'Amazone Act 1784	An Act the title of which begins with the words,—An Act for authorising the Treasurer of the Navy,—and ends with the words,—Ships of War belonging to the Enemy.	The whole act.
24 Geo. 3. Sess. 2. c. 33	Loans or Exchequer Bills Act 1784	An Act for raising a certain Sum of Money by Loans or Exchequer Bills for the Service of the Year One thousand seven hundred and eighty-four.	The whole act.
24 Geo. 3. Sess. 2. c. 42	Pawnbrokers Act 1784	An Act the title of which begins with the words,—An Act to explain, amend, and render more effectual, an Act made in the Thirtieth Year,—and ends with the words,—easy Redemption of Goods pawned.	The whole act.
24 Geo. 3. Sess. 2. c. 44	Appropriation Act 1784	An Act the title of which begins with the words,—An Act for granting to His Majesty a certain Sum of Money out of the Sinking Fund,—and ends with the words,—Supplies granted in this Session of Parliament.	The whole act.
24 Geo. 3. Sess. 2. c. 45	Trade with British America Act 1784	An Act the title of which begins with the words,—An Act to extend the Powers of an Act made in the Twenty-third Year,—and ends with the words,— with respect to certain Articles therein mentioned.	The whole act.
24 Geo. 3. Sess. 2. c. 50	Exportation, etc. Act 1784	An Act the title of which begins with the words,—An Act to revive and continue several Laws, relating to the allowing the Exportation,—and ends with the words,—Wine removed in Bottles and other Packages.	The whole act.
24 Geo. 3. Sess. 2. c. 52	Loans or Exchequer Bills (No. 2) Act 1784	An Act for raising a further Sum of Money, by Loans or Exchequer Bills, for the Service of the Year One thousand seven hundred and eighty-four.	The whole act.
24 Geo. 3. Sess. 2. c. 53	Plate Duties Act 1784	An Act for granting to His Majesty certain Duties on all Gold and Silver Plate imported, and also certain Duties on all Gold and Silver wrought Plate made in Great Britain.	Sections One to Three, Sixteen and Eighteen.
24 Geo. 3. Sess. 2. c. 56	Transportation, etc. Act 1784	An Act for the effectual Transportation of Felons and other Offenders; and to authorize the Removal of Prisoners in certain Cases; and for other purposes therein mentioned.	The whole act.
25 Geo. 3. c. 1	Trade Act 1785	An Act the title of which begins with the words,—An Act for confining, for a limited Time, the Trade between the Ports of the United States,—and ends with the words,—Licence according to the Form hereunto annexed.	The whole act.
25 Geo. 3. c. 2	Malt Duties Act 1785	An Act for continuing and granting to His Majesty certain Duties upon Malt, Mum, Cyder, and Perry, for the Service of the Year One thousand seven hundred and eighty-five.	The whole act.
25 Geo. 3. c. 3	Marine Mutiny Act 1785	An Act for the Regulation of His Majesty's Marine Forces while on Shore.	The whole act.
25 Geo. 3. c. 4	Land Tax Act 1785	An Act for granting an Aid to His Majesty by a Land Tax, to be raised in Great Britain, for the Service of the Year One thousand seven hundred and eighty-five.	The whole act.
25 Geo. 3. c. 5	Trade with America Act 1785	An Act the title of which begins with the words,—An Act for further continuing, for a limited Time, an Act made in the Twenty-third Year,—and ends with the words,—with respect to certain Articles therein mentioned.	The whole act.
25 Geo. 3. c. 6	Mutiny Act 1785	An Act for punishing Mutiny and Desertion; and for the better Payment of the Army and their Quarters.	The whole act.
25 Geo. 3. c. 8	Militia Pay Act 1785	An Act for defraying the Charge of the Militia in that Part of Great Britain called England for One Year, beginning the Twenty-fifth Day of March, One thousand seven hundred and eighty-five.	The whole act.
25 Geo. 3. c. 11	Loans or Exchequer Bills Act 1785	An Act for raising a certain Sum of Money, by Loans or Exchequer Bills, for the Service of the Year One thousand seven hundred and eighty-five.	The whole act.
25 Geo. 3. c. 12	Loans or Exchequer Bills (No. 2) Act 1785	An Act for raising a further Sum of Money, by Loans or Exchequer Bills, for the Service of the Year One thousand seven hundred and eighty-five.	The whole act.
25 Geo. 3. c. 17	Trial of a Certain Election Act 1785	An Act the title of which begins with the words,—An Act to enable the House of Commons to authorise the Select Committee,—and ends with the words,— Returns of Members to serve in Parliament.	The whole act.
25 Geo. 3. c. 19	Inquiry into Fees (Public Offices) Act 1785	An Act the title of which begins with the words,—An Act for appointing Commissioners to enquire into the Fees,—and ends with the words,—Businesses transacted in the said Offices.	The whole act.
25 Geo. 3. c. 20	Land Tax (Commissioners) Act 1785	An Act the title of which begins with the words,—An Act for appointing Commissioners to put in Execution an Act of this Session,—and ends with the words,—Land Tax Act of this Session of Parliament.	The whole act.
25 Geo. 3. c. 22	Excise Act 1785	An Act the title of which begins with the words,—An Act for continuing so much of an Act made in the last Session,—and ends with the words,—and imposing a Duty on such Licences.	The whole act.
25 Geo. 3. c. 24	Repeal of Certain Duties Act 1785	An Act the title of which begins with the words,—An Act to repeal so much of an Act made in the last Session,—and ends with the words,—and on Licences for bleaching or dying the same.	The whole act.
25 Geo. 3. c. 25	Customs Act 1785	An Act for allowing further Time for the Importation of Goods, the Produce or manufacture of the Island of Tobago, upon Payment of the British Plantation Duties.	The whole act.
25 Geo. 3. c. 29	Bounties for Destroying Spanish Ships Act 1785	An Act the title of which begins with the words,—An Act to explain, amend, and render more effectual an Act passed in the Twenty-third Year,—and ends with the words,—Ships of War belonging to the Enemy.	The whole act.
25 Geo. 3. c. 33	Loans or Exchequer Bills (No. 3) Act 1785	An Act for raising a further Sum of Money, by Exchequer Bills, for the Service of the Year One thousand seven hundred and eighty-five.	The whole act.
25 Geo. 3. c. 48	Pawnbrokers Act 1785	An Act for granting to His Majesty certain Stamp-Duties on Licences to be taken out by Persons using or exercising the Trade or Business of a Pawnbroker.	Except Sections Five to Eight.
25 Geo. 3. c. 53	Annuity to Duke of Gloucester Act 1785	An Act for settling an Annuity of Nine thousand Pounds on His Royal Highness the Duke of Gloucester, in lieu of the like Annuity payable out of the Duties of Four and one Half per Centum in Barbadoes and the Leeward Islands.	The whole act.
25 Geo. 3. c. 56	Cordage for Shipping Act 1785	An Act for more effectually preventing Deceits and Frauds in the manufacturing of Cordage for Shipping, and to prevent the illicit Importation of Foreign-made Cordage.	The whole act.
25 Geo. 3. c. 59	Lottery Act 1785	An Act for granting to His Majesty a certain Sum of Money, to be raised by a Lottery.	The whole act.
25 Geo. 3. c. 60	Appropriation, etc. Act 1785	An Act the title of which begins with the words,—An Act for granting to His Majesty a certain Sum of Money out of the Sinking Fund,—and ends with the words,—Post, between Great Britain and Ireland.	The whole act.
25 Geo. 3. c. 61	Civil List Act 1785	An Act the title of which begins with the words,—An Act to authorise the Lord Steward of the Household,—and ends with the words,—Persons in low and indigent Circumstances.	The whole act.
25 Geo. 3. c. 62	Exportation Act 1785	An Act to prohibit, for a limited Time, the Exportation of Hay.	The whole act.
25 Geo. 3. c. 64	Plate (Duties, Drawbacks) Act 1785	An Act the title of which begins with the words,—An Act for altering and amending an Act made in the last Session,—and ends with the words,—wrought Plate made in Great Britain.	Sections Two and Four.
25 Geo. 3. c. 68	Audit of Public Accounts Act 1785	An Act for appointing and enabling Commissioners further to examine, take, and state the Publick Accounts of the Kingdom.	The whole act.
25 Geo. 3. c. 74	Excise (No. 3) Act 1785	An Act the title of which begins with the words,—An Act for repealing the Duty imposed on Tea,—and ends with the words,—better securing the Duties on Candles.	The whole act.
25 Geo. 3. c. 76	American Loyalists Act 1785	An Act the title of which begins with the words,—An Act for appointing Commissioners further to enquire into the Losses,—and ends with the words,— Attachment to the British Government.	The whole act.
25 Geo. 3. c. 77	Fires Prevention Act 1785	An Act the title of which begins with the words,—An Act to amend so much of an Act, made in the Fourteenth Year,—and ends with the words,—Manufactory from the Provisions herein contained.	Sections Three and Four.
25 Geo. 3. c. 78	Hawkers Act 1785	An Act for granting to His Majesty additional Duties on Hawkers, Pedlars, and Petty Chapmen; and for regulating their Trade.	The whole act.
25 Geo. 3. c. 79	Medicine Duties Act 1785	An Act the title of which begins with the words,—An Act for repealing an Act made in the Twenty-third Year,—and ends with the words,—granting other Duties in lieu thereof.	The whole act.
25 Geo. 3. c. 81	Duties on Tobacco Act 1785	An Act for the better securing the Duties payable on Tobacco. Repealed as to all Her Majesty Dominions.	The whole act.
26 Geo. 3. c. 1	Trade Act 1786	An Act the title of which begins with the words,—An Act for confining, for a limited Time, the Trade,—and ends with the words,—Licence according to the Form hereunto annexed.	The whole act.
26 Geo. 3. c. 2	Exportation Act 1786	An Act to continue an Act, made in the last Session of Parliament, intituled An Act to prohibit, for a limited Time, the Exportation of Hay.	The whole act.
26 Geo. 3. c. 3	Land Tax Act 1786	An Act for granting an Aid to His Majesty by a Land Tax, to be raised in Great Britain, for the Service of the Year One thousand seven hundred and eighty-six.	The whole act.
26 Geo. 3. c. 4	Trade with America Act 1786	An Act the title of which begins with the words,—An Act for further continuing, for a limited Time, an Act made in the Twenty-third Year,—and ends with the words,—with respect to certain Articles therein mentioned.	The whole act.
26 Geo. 3. c. 5	Exportation (No. 2) Act 1786	An Act to regulate the Exportation of Hops to Ireland.	The whole act.
26 Geo. 3. c. 6	Malt Duties Act 1786	An Act for continuing and granting to His Majesty certain Duties upon Malt, Mum, Cyder, and Perry, for the Service of the Year One thousand seven hundred and eighty-six.	The whole act.
26 Geo. 3. c. 7	Marine Mutiny Act 1786	An Act for the Regulation of His Majesty's Marine Forces while on Shore.	The whole act.
26 Geo. 3. c. 8	Crew of a Certain Foreign Vessel Act 1786	An Act to enable the Persons therein named to provide proper Places on Shore for the Reception of the Crew of the Voorberg Dutch East Indiaman, forced by Stress of Weather into the Port of Dartmouth.	The whole act.
26 Geo. 3. c. 10	Mutiny Act 1786	An Act for punishing Mutiny and Desertion; and for the better Payment of the Army and their Quarters.	The whole act.
26 Geo. 3. c. 26	Newfoundland Fisheries Act 1786	An Act the title of which begins with the words,—An Act to amend and render more effectual the several Laws,—and ends with the words,—Bounties for a limited Time, on certain Terms and Conditions. Repealed as to all Her Majesty's Dominions.	The whole act.
26 Geo. 3. c. 31	National Debt Reduction Act 1786	An Act for vesting certain Sums in Commissioners, at the End of every Quarter of a Year, to be by them applied to the Reduction of the National Debt.	Except Section Fourteen to "this Act" and Sections Fifteen and Sixteen.
26 Geo. 3. c. 32	Loans or Exchequer Bills Act 1786	An Act for raising a certain Sum of Money, by Loans or Exchequer Bills, for the Service of the Year One thousand seven hundred and eighty-six.	The whole act.
26 Geo. 3. c. 33	Loans or Exchequer Bills (No. 2) Act 1786	An Act for raising a further Sum of Money, by Loans or Exchequer Bills, for the Service of the Year One thousand seven hundred and eighty-six.	The whole act.
26 Geo. 3. c. 35	Bounties for Destroying Spanish Ships Act 1786	An Act the title of which begins with the words,—An Act to explain, amend, and render more effectual an Act made in the last Session,—and ends with the words,—Ships of War belonging to the Enemy.	The whole act.
26 Geo. 3. c. 38	Imprisonment of Debtors, etc. Act 1786	An Act the title of which begins with the words,—An Act for regulating the Time of the Imprisonment of Debtors,—and ends with the words,— Qualifications of the Commissioners.	The whole act.
26 Geo. 3. c. 43	Hemp and Flax Act 1786	An Act for continuing an Act made in the Twenty-first Year of His Majesty's Reign, for the Encouragement of the Growth of Hemp and Flax, in that part of Great Britain called England.	The whole act.
26 Geo. 3. c. 44	Relief and Debtors Act 1786	An Act the title of which begins with the words,—An Act for the further Relief of Debtors,—and ends with the words,—their Estates for their Creditors Benefit.	The whole act.
26 Geo. 3. c. 47	Admiralty, etc., Courts (Scotland) Act 1786	An Act the title of which begins with the words,—An Act for discharging the Payment of Sentence Money,—and ends with the words,—Nomination of the said Judges.	The whole act.
26 Geo. 3. c. 52	Tobacco Duties Act 1786	An Act the title of which begins with the words,—An Act for the more effectually preventing the fraudulent Removal of Tobacco,—and ends with the words,— Growth of the British Plantations, and the United States of America.	The whole act.
26 Geo. 3. c. 53	Continuance of Laws Act 1786	An Act the title of which begins with the words,—An Act to continue several Laws relating to the giving further Encouragement to the Importation of Naval Stores,—and ends with the words,—indressed Flax from His Majesty's Colonies in America.	The whole act.
26 Geo. 3. c. 54	Land Tax (No. 2) Act 1786	An Act the title of which begins with the words,—An Act for continuing the Salaries and Profits of the Commissioners,—and ends with the words,— removed into any other Division or Place.	The whole act.
26 Geo. 3. c. 56	Returns Relative to the Poor Act 1786	An Act for obliging Overseers of the Poor to make Returns, upon Oath, to certain Questions specified therein, relative to the State of the Poor.	The whole act.
26 Geo. 3. c. 58	Returns of Charitable Donations Act 1786	An Act for procuring upon Oath, Returns of all charitable Donations, for the Benefit of poor Persons, in the several Parishes and Places within that Part of Great Britain called England.	The whole act.
26 Geo. 3. c. 59	Excise Act 1786	An Act for repealing certain Duties now payable on Wines imported, and for granting new Duties in lieu thereof, to be collected under the Management of the Commissioners of Excise.	The whole act.
26 Geo. 3. c. 61	Appropriation Act 1786	An Act the title of which begins with the words,—An Act for granting to His Majesty a certain Sum of Money out of the Sinking Fund,—and ends with the words,—Supplies granted in this Session of Parliament.	The whole act.
26 Geo. 3. c. 64	Excise (No. 2) Act 1786	An Act to discontinue, for a limited Time, the several Duties payable in Scotland upon Low Wines and Spirits, and upon Worts, Wash, and other Liquors, there used in the Distillation of Spirits; and for granting to His Majesty other Duties in lieu thereof.	The whole act.
26 Geo. 3. c. 65	Lottery Act 1786	An Act for granting to His Majesty a certain Sum of Money, to be raised by a Lottery.	The whole act.
26 Geo. 3. c. 66	Inquiry into Fees (Public Offices) Act 1786	An Act the title of which begins with the words,—An Act for appointing Commissioners further to inquire into the Fees,—and ends with the words,— Business transacted in the said Offices.	The whole act.
26 Geo. 3. c. 67	Audit of Public Accounts Act 1786	An Act for appointing and enabling Commissioners further to examine, take, and state the publick Accounts of the Kingdom.	The whole act.
26 Geo. 3. c. 68	American Loyalists Act 1786	An Act the title of which begins with the words,—An Act for appointing Commissioners further to enquire into the Losses,—and ends with the words, —Attachment to the British Government.	The whole act.
26 Geo. 3. c. 69	Militia Pay Act 1786	An Act for defraying the Charge of the Militia in that Part of Great Britain called England for One Year, beginning the Twenty-fifth Day of March, One thousand seven hundred and eighty-six.	The whole act.
26 Geo. 3. c. 70	Rectifying a Mistake in Chapter 61 Act 1786	An Act the title of which begins with the words,—An Act to rectify a Mistake in an Act made in this present Session,—and ends with the words,— Supplies granted in this Session of Parliament.	The whole act.
26 Geo. 3. c. 71	Knackers Act 1786	An Act for regulating Houses, and other Places, kept for the Purpose of Slaughtering Horses.	Section Seventeen.
26 Geo. 3. c. 73	Excise (No. 3) Act 1786	An Act the title of which begins with the words,—An Act to discontinue, for a limited Time, the Payment of the Duties upon Low Wines,—and ends with the words,—Duties upon Rum and Spirits imported from the West Indies.	The whole act.
26 Geo. 3. c. 74	Excise (No. 4) Act 1786	An Act for granting to His Majesty additional Duties upon Sweets, and for ascertaining the Duties upon Licences to be taken out by Persons dealing in Sweets.	The whole act.
26 Geo. 3. c. 75	Losses from Cession of East Florida Act 1786	An Act for appointing Commissioners to enquire into the Losses of all such Persons who have suffered in their Properties, in consequence of the Cession of the Province of East Florida to the King of Spain.	The whole act.
26 Geo. 3. c. 76	Exportation (No. 3) Act 1786	An Act for repealing so much of Two Acts passed in the Fourteenth and Twenty-first Years of His present Majesty, as prohibits the Exportation of Wool Cards of a limited Price.	The whole act.
26 Geo. 3. c. 77	Excise (No. 5) Act 1786	An Act the title of which begins with the words,—An Act to limit a Time for the Repayment of the Duties on Malt Servants,—and ends with the words,—Duties under the Management of the Commissioners of Excise.	Except Sections Eight, Twelve, and Nineteen.
26 Geo. 3. c. 78	Paper Duties Act 1786	An Act for better securing the Duties on Paper printed, painted, or stained, in Great Britain.	The whole act.
26 Geo. 3. c. 80	Continuance of Laws (No. 2) Act 1786	An Act for further continuing certain Acts therein mentioned, relating to the further Punishment of Persons going armed or disguised, in Defiance of the Laws of Customs or Excise; and to the preventing the committing of Frauds by Bankrupts.	The whole act.
26 Geo. 3. c. 84	Consecration of Bishops Abroad Act 1786	An Act to empower the Archbishop of Canterbury, or the Archbishop of York, for the Time being, to consecrate to the Office of a Bishop, Persons being Subjects or Citizens of Countries out of His Majesty's Dominions.	The whole act.
26 Geo. 3. c. 85	Bounty on Cordage Exported Act 1786	An Act the title of which begins with the words,—An Act to revive, continue, and amend so much of an Act, made in the Sixth Year,—and ends with the words,—Exportation of British made Cordage.	The whole act.
26 Geo. 3. c. 87	Crown Land Revenues, etc. Act 1786	An Act for appointing Commissioners to enquire into the State and Condition of the Woods, Forests, and Land Revenues belonging to the Crown; and to sell or alienate Fee-farm, and other unimproveable Rents.	The whole act.
26 Geo. 3. c. 88	Annuity to Lady Maria Carlton Act 1786	An Act the title of which begins with the words,—An Act for settling and securing a certain Annuity for the use of Lady Mary Carlow,—and ends with the words,—Services performed by him to His Majesty, and this Country.	The whole act.
26 Geo. 3. c. 92	Unlawful Pawning Act 1786	An Act the title of which begins with the words,—An Act to continue, for a limited Time, an Act made in the Twenty-fourth Year,—and ends with the words,—easy Redemption of Goods pawned.	The whole act.
26 Geo. 3. c. 93	Annuity to Brook Watson, Esquire Act 1786	An Act to enable His Majesty to grant a certain Annuity to Brook Watson, Esquire, late Commissary General in North America, in consideration of his diligent and meritorious Services in that Office.	The whole act.
26 Geo. 3. c. 95	First Meetings of Certain Commissioners Act 1786	An Act for enlarging the Times appointed for the First Meetings of Commissioners, and other Persons, for putting in Execution certain Acts of this Session of Parliament.	The whole act.
26 Geo. 3. c. 96	Proceedings Against Warren Hastings Act 1786	An Act the title of which begins with the words,—An Act to provide that the Proceedings now depending in the House of Commons,—and ends with the words,—Dissolution of Parliament.	The whole act.
26 Geo. 3. c. 97	Exchequer Bills Act 1786	An Act for raising a further Sum of Money, by Exchequer Bills, for the Service of the Year One thousand seven hundred and eighty-six.	The whole act.
26 Geo. 3. c. 103	Land Tax (No. 3) Act 1786	An Act the title of which begins with the words,—An Act for assessing the Commissioners,—and ends with the words,—Removal of the said Office into any other Division or Place.	The whole act.
26 Geo. 3. c. 106	British Fisheries Society Act 1786	An Act the title of which begins with the words,—An Act for continuing the Salaries and Profits of the Commissioners,—and ends with the words,— Office should be removed into any other Division or Place.	The whole act.
26 Geo. 3. c. 121	Land Tax (No. 5) Act 1786	An Act the title of which begins with the words,—An Act for appointing Commissioners for putting in Execution an Act of this Session,—and ends with the words,—One thousand seven hundred and eighty-six.	The whole act.
27 Geo. 3. c. 2.	New South Wales Courts Act 1787	An Act to enable His Majesty to establish a Court of Criminal Judicature on the Eastern Coast of New South Wales, and the Parts adjacent. Repealed as to all Her Majesty's Dominions.	The whole act.
27 Geo. 3. c. 3.	Marine Mutiny Act 1787	An Act for the Regulation of His Majesty's Marine Forces while on Shore.	The whole act.
27 Geo. 3. c. 4	Malt Duties Act 1787	An Act for continuing and granting to His Majesty certain Duties upon Malt, Mum, Cyder, and Perry, for the Service of the Year One thousand seven hundred and eighty-seven.	The whole act.
27 Geo. 3. c. 5	Land Tax Act 1787	An Act for granting an Aid to His Majesty by a Land Tax, to be raised in Great Britain for the Service of the Year One thousand seven hundred and eighty-seven.	The whole act.
27 Geo. 3. c. 6	Mutiny Act 1787	An Act for punishing Mutiny and Desertion; and for the better Payment of the Army and their Quarters.	The whole act.
27 Geo. 3. c. 7	Trade with America Act 1787	An Act to continue the Laws now in Force for regulating the Trade between the Subjects of His Majesty's Dominions, and the Inhabitants of the Territories belonging to the United States of America, and to render the Provisions thereof more effectual.	The whole act.
27 Geo. 3. c. 8	Militia Pay, etc. Act 1787	An Act the title of which begins with the words,—An Act for defraying the Charge of the Pay and Cloathing of the Militia,—and ends with the words,— further Time for that Purpose.	The whole act.
27 Geo. 3. c. 11	Vagrants and Criminals Act 1787	An Act the title of which begins with the words,—An Act to explain and amend so much of an Act, made in the Sixth Year,—and ends with the words,— Common Gaol or House of Correction.	The whole act.
27 Geo. 3. c. 12	Annuity to Sir John Skynner Act 1787	An Act the title of which begins with the words,—An Act to enable His Majesty to grant a certain Annuity to the Right Honourable Sir John Skynner,—and ends with the words,—upright Conduct in the Execution of that Office.	The whole act.
27 Geo. 3. c. 13	Customs and Excise Act 1787	An Act the title of which begins with the words,—An Act for repealing the several Duties of Customs and Excise,—and ends with the words,—Annuities on Lives, for the Reduction of the National Debt.	The whole act.
27 Geo. 3. c. 16	Negotiations of Certain Notes and Bills Act 1787	An Act for making perpetual Two Acts passed in the Fifteenth and Seventeenth Years of the Reign of His present Majesty, for restraining the Negotiation of Promissory Notes and Bills of Exchange under a limited Sum, within that Part of Great Britain called England.	The whole act.
27 Geo. 3. c. 18	Justiciary Circuit and Courts (Scotland) Act 1787	An Act for making perpetual an Act made in the Twenty-third Year of the Reign of His present Majesty, intituled An Act for regulating the Proceedings of the Court of Justiciary and Circuit Courts in Scotland.	The whole act.
27 Geo. 3. c. 21	Exemption from Coal Duty Act 1787	An Act the title of which begins with the words,—An Act to enable the Commissioners of His Majesty's Treasury,—and ends with the words,— Duty on Coals exported.	The whole act.
27 Geo. 3. c. 23	Loans or Exchequer Bills Act 1787	An Act for raising a certain Sum of Money by Loans or Exchequer Bills, for the Service of the Year One thousand seven hundred and eighty-seven.	The whole act.
27 Geo. 3. c. 24	Loans or Exchequer Bills (No. 2) Act 1787	An Act for raising a further Sum of Money, by Loans or Exchequer Bills, for the Service of the Year One thousand seven hundred and eighty-seven.	The whole act.
27 Geo. 3. c. 25	Exchequer Bills Act 1787	An Act for raising a further Sum of Money, by Exchequer Bills, for the Service of the Year One thousand seven hundred and eighty-seven.	The whole act.
27 Geo. 3. c. 33	Appropriation Act 1787	An Act the title of which begins with the words,—An Act for granting to His Majesty a certain Sum of Money out of the Consolidated Fund,—and ends with the words,—Supplies granted in this Session of Parliament.	The whole act.
27 Geo. 3. c. 35	Inquiry into Fees, Public Offices Act 1787	An Act the title of which begins with the words,—An Act for appointing Commissioners further to enquire into the Fees,—and ends with the words, —Business transacted in the said Offices.	The whole act.
27 Geo. 3. c. 36	Continuance of Laws Act 1787	An Act the title of which begins with the words,—An Act to continue several Laws relating to the free Importation of certain Raw Hides,—and ends with the words,—Duties on Foreign Raw Linen Yarns made of Flax imported.	The whole act.
27 Geo. 3. c. 37	Pawnbrokers Act 1787	An Act for further regulating the Trade and Business of Pawnbrokers.	The whole act.
27 Geo. 3. c. 39	American Loyalists Act 1787	An Act the title of which begins with the words,—An Act for appointing Commissioners further to enquire into the Losses,—and ends with the words, —Attachment to the British Government.	The whole act.
27 Geo. 3. c. 41	Lotteries Act 1787	An Act for granting to His Majesty a certain Sum of Money to be raised by a Lottery.	The whole act.
27 Geo. 3. c. 42	Papists Act 1787	An Act for allowing further Time for Inrollment of Deeds and Wills made by Papists, and for Relief of Protestant Purchasers.	The whole act.
27 Geo. 3. c. 44	Ecclesiastical Suits Act 1787	An Act to prevent frivolous and vexatious Suits in Ecclesiastical Courts.	Section One.
27 Geo. 3. c. 47	Land Tax (Commissioners) Act 1787	An Act the title of which begins with the words,—An Act for rectifying Mistakes in the Names of several of the Commissioners,—and ends with the words,—One thousand seven hundred and eighty-seven.	The whole act.
28 Geo. 3. c. 1	Malt Duties Act 1788	An Act for continuing and granting to His Majesty certain Duties upon Malt, Mum, Cyder, and Perry, for the Service of the Year One thousand seven hundred and eighty-eight.	The whole act.
28 Geo. 3. c. 2	Land Tax Act 1788	An Act for granting an Aid to His Majesty by a Land Tax, to be raised in Great Britain, for the Service of the Year One thousand seven hundred and eighty-eight.	The whole act.
28 Geo. 3. c. 3	Marine Mutiny Act 1788	An Act for the Regulation of His Majesty's Marine Forces while on Shore.	The whole act.
28 Geo. 3. c. 4	Duty on Spirits Act 1788	An Act for charging an additional Duty on Spirits manufactured in Scotland and imported into England.	The whole act.
28 Geo. 3. c. 5	Trade with America Act 1788	An Act the title of which begins with the words,—An Act to continue the Laws now in Force for regulating the Trade,—and ends with the words,— Inhabitants of the Countries belonging to the said United States.	The whole act.
28 Geo. 3. c. 11	Militia Pay Act 1788	An Act for defraying the Charge of the Pay and Cloathing of the Militia in that Part of Great Britain called England, for One Year, beginning the Twenty-fifth Day of March One thousand seven hundred and eighty-eight.	The whole act.
28 Geo. 3. c. 12	Mutiny Act 1788	An Act for punishing Mutiny and Desertion; and for the better Payment of the Army and their Quarters.	The whole act.
28 Geo. 3. c. 16	Exportation Act 1788	An Act for repealing an Act, made in the Second and Third Years of the Reign of King Edward the Sixth, intituled An Act against the carrying of White Ashes out of the Realm.	The whole act.
28 Geo. 3. c. 18	Loans or Exchequer Bills Act 1788	An Act for raising a certain Sum of Money by Loans or Exchequer Bills, for the Service of the Year One thousand seven hundred and eighty-eight.	The whole act.
28 Geo. 3. c. 19	Loans or Exchequer Bills (No. 2) Act 1788	An Act for raising a further Sum of Money by Loans or Exchequer Bills, for the Service of the Year One thousand seven hundred and eighty-eight.	The whole act.
28 Geo. 3. c. 21	Lottery Act 1788	An Act for granting to His Majesty a certain Sum of Money, to be raised by a Lottery.	The whole act.
28 Geo. 3. c. 23	Continuance of Laws Act 1788	An Act the title of which begins with the words,—An Act to continue several Laws relating to the clandestine running of uncustomed Goods,—and ends with the words,—ascertaining the Strength of Spirits by Clarke's Hydrometer.	The whole act.
28 Geo. 3. c. 24	Continuance of Laws (No. 2) Act 1788	An Act the title of which begins with the words,—An Act to continue several Laws relating to the granting a Bounty on the Exportation,—and ends with the words,—Imprisonment and Transportation of Offenders.	The whole act.
28 Geo. 3. c. 26	Appropriation Act 1788	An Act the title of which begins with the words,—An Act for granting to His Majesty a certain Sum of Money out of the Consolidated Fund,—and ends with the words,—Supplies granted in this Session of Parliament.	The whole act.
28 Geo. 3 c. 31	Losses from Cession of East Florida Act 1788	An Act for appointing Commissioners further to enquire into the Losses of all such Persons who have suffered in their Properties in consequence of the Cession of the Province of East Florida to the King of Spain.	The whole act.
28 Geo. 3 c. 35	Newfoundland Fisheries Act 1788	An Act the title of which begins with the words,—An Act to enable His Majesty to make such Regulations,—and ends with the words,—Fishery on the Coasts of the Island of Newfoundland, Labrador, and the Islands adjacent thereunto.	The whole act.
28 Geo. 3 c. 40	Compensation to American Loyalists, etc. Act 1788	An Act the title of which begins with the words,—An Act for giving Relief to such Persons as have suffered in their Rights and Properties,—and ends with the words,—East Florida to the King of Spain.	The whole act.
28 Geo. 3 c. 41	Annuity to Duke of Saint Albans Act 1788	An Act to enable His Majesty to grant a certain Annuity to the Most Noble Aubrey Duke of Saint Albans.	The whole act.
28 Geo. 3 c. 42	Annuity to Family of Sir Guy Carlton Act 1788	An Act to explain and amend an Act made in the Twenty-sixth Year,—and ends with the words,—eminent Services performed by him to His Majesty and this Country.	The whole act.
28 Geo. 3 c. 43	Annuity to Brook Watson, Esquire Act 1788	An Act the title of which begins with the words,—An Act for obviating a Doubt in an Act, made in the Twenty-sixth year,—and ends with the words,—meritorious Services in that Office.	The whole act.
28 Geo. 3 c. 44	American Loyalists Act 1788	An Act the title of which begins with the words,—An Act for appointing Commissioners further to enquire into the Losses,—and ends with the words,—Attachment to the British Government.	The whole act.
28 Geo. 3 c. 45	Exportation (No. 3) Act 1788	An Act to prohibit, for a limited Time, the Exportation of Hay.	The whole act.
28 Geo. 3 c. 46	Excise (No. 2) Act 1788	An Act the title of which begins with the words,—An Act for discontinuing, for a limited Time, the several Duties payable in Scotland,—and ends with the words,—Duties upon Rum and Spirits imported from the West Indies.	The whole act.
28 Geo. 3 c. 47	Papists Act 1788	An Act for allowing further Time for Inrolment of Deeds and Wills made by Papists, and for Relief of Protestant Purchasers.	The whole act.
28 Geo. 3 c. 48	Chimney Sweepers Act 1788	An Act for the better Regulation of Chimney-Sweepers, and their Apprentices.	The whole act.
28 Geo. 3 c. 50	Pawnbrokers Act 1788	An Act to amend, and continue, for a limited Time, an Act passed in the Twenty-seventh Year of the Reign of His present Majesty, intituled An Act for further regulating the Trade and Commerce of Nova Scotia.	The whole act.
28 Geo. 3 c. 54	Slave Trade Act 1788	An Act to regulate, for a limited Time, the shipping and carrying Slaves in British Vessels from the Coast of Africa.	The whole act.
28 Geo. 3 c. 55	Protection of Stocking Frames, etc. Act 1788	An Act the title of which begins with the words,—An Act for the better and more effectual Protection of the Trade,—and ends with the words,—Wool or Cotton for the Use of the Stocking Frame.	Section Four.
29 Geo. 3 c. 1	Trade with America Act 1789	An Act the title of which begins with the words,—An Act to continue the Laws now in force for regulating the Trade,—and ends with the words,—Inhabitants of the Countries belonging to the said United States.	The whole act.
29 Geo. 3 c. 2	Mutiny Act 1789	An Act for punishing Mutiny and Desertion; and for the better Payment of the Army and their Quarters.	The whole act.
29 Geo. 3 c. 3	Marine Mutiny Act 1789	An Act for the Regulation of His Majesty's Marine Forces while on Shore.	The whole act.
29 Geo. 3 c. 6	Land Tax Act 1789	An Act for granting an Aid to His Majesty by a Land Tax, to be raised in Great Britain, for the Service of the Year One thousand seven hundred and eighty-nine.	The whole act.
29 Geo. 3 c. 9	Duties on Shops Act 1789	An Act to repeal Two Acts, made in the Twenty-fifth and Twenty-sixth Years of the Reign of His present Majesty, for granting to His Majesty certain Duties on Shops within Great Britain.	The whole act.
29 Geo. 3 c. 10	Malt Duties Act 1789	An Act for continuing and granting to His Majesty certain Duties upon Malt, Mum, Cyder, and Perry, for the Service of the Year One thousand seven hundred and eighty-nine.	The whole act.
29 Geo. 3 c. 13	County Elections Act 1789	An Act the title of which begins with the words,—An Act to suspend, for a limited Time, the Execution of an Act passed in the last Session,—and ends with the words,—not exceeding Two Years from the passing the said Act.	The whole act.
29 Geo. 3 c. 15	Militia Pay Act 1789	An Act for defraying the Charge of the Pay and Cloathing of the Militia, in that Part of Great Britain called England, for One Year, beginning the Twenty-fifth Day of March One thousand seven hundred and eighty-nine.	The whole act.
29 Geo. 3 c. 18	County Elections (No. 2) Act 1789	An Act for repealing an Act made in the last Session of Parliament, intituled An Act for the better securing the Rights of Persons qualified to vote at County Elections.	The whole act.
29 Geo. 3 c. 33	Lottery Act 1789	An Act for granting to His Majesty a certain Sum of Money, to be raised by a Lottery.	The whole act.
29 Geo. 3 c. 34	Loans or Exchequer Bills Act 1789	An Act for raising a certain Sum of Money, by Loans or Exchequer Bills, for the Service of the Year One thousand seven hundred and eighty-nine.	The whole act.
29 Geo. 3 c. 35	Loans or Exchequer Bills Act 1789	An Act for raising a further Sum of Money, by Loans or Exchequer Bills, for the Service of the Year One thousand seven hundred and eighty-nine.	The whole act.
29 Geo. 3 c. 36	Papists Act 1789	An Act for allowing further Time for Inrolment of Deeds and Wills made by Papists, and for Relief of Protestant Purchasers.	The whole act.
29 Geo. 3 c. 41	Tontine Annuities Act 1789	An Act for raising a certain Sum of Money, by way of Annuities, to be attended with the Benefit of Survivorship, in Classes.	Section One from "be at liberty" to "and shall," and Sections Two to Four, Fourteen to Twenty, Thirty-five, Thirty-six, Thirty-eight, and Thirty-nine.
29 Geo. 3 c. 45	Excise Duties Act 1789	An Act the title of which begins with the words,—An Act for amending and continuing, for a limited Time, an Act made in the last Session,—and ends with the words,—and to revive and continue the said last-mentioned Act.	The whole act.
29 Geo. 3 c. 51	Stamps (No. 2) Act 1789	An Act for granting to His Majesty several additional Stamp Duties on Probates of Wills, Letters of Administration, and on Receipts for Legacies, or for any Share of a Personal Estate divided by Force of the Statute of Distributions.	The whole act.
29 Geo. 3 c. 54	Flax and Cotton Manufactures Act 1789	An Act for further continuing an Act made in the Twenty-third Year of the Reign of His present Majesty, intituled An Act for the more effectual Encouragement of the Manufactures of Flax and Cotton in Great Britain.	The whole act.
29 Geo. 3 c. 55	Continuance of Laws Act 1789	An Act the title of which begins with the words,—An Act to continue several Laws therein mentioned,—and ends with the words,—ascertaining the Strength of Spirits by Clarke's Hydrometer.	The whole act.
29 Geo. 3 c. 60	Customs (No. 2) Act 1789	An Act for granting further Time for allowing the Drawback upon the Exportation of Coffee, imported by the East India Company in the Ship Lord Camden, in the Year One thousand seven hundred and eighty-six.	The whole act.
29 Geo. 3 c. 61	Appropriation Act 1789	An Act the title of which begins with the words,—An Act for granting to His Majesty a certain Sum of Money out of the Consolidated Fund,—and ends with the words,—Orders, lost, burnt, or otherwise destroyed.	The whole act.
29 Geo. 3 c. 62	American Loyalists Act 1789	An Act the title of which begins with the words,—An Act for appointing Commissioners further to enquire into the Losses,—and ends with the words,—Attachment to the British Government.	The whole act.
29 Geo. 3 c. 63	Excise Act 1789	An Act the title of which begins with the words,—An Act to exempt all Piece Goods wove in this Kingdom,—and ends with the words,—Licences for that Purpose.	The whole act.
29 Geo. 3 c. 64	Customs (No. 3) Act 1789	An Act the title of which begins with the words,—An Act to authorise the Lord High Treasurer, or the Commissioners of the Treasury,—and ends with the words,—Persons employed in that Revenue.	The whole act.
29 Geo. 3 c. 66	Slave Trade Act 1789	An Act to continue, for a limited Time, and amend an Act made in the last Session of Parliament, intituled An Act to regulate, for a limited Time, the shipping and carrying Slaves in British Vessels from the Coast of Africa.	The whole act.
30 Geo. 3 c. 1	Importation and Exportation Act 1790	An Act the title of which begins with the words,—An Act for indemnifying all Persons,—and ends with the words,—Provisions relative thereto.	The whole act.
30 Geo. 3 c. 2	Land Tax Act 1790	An Act for granting an Aid to His Majesty by a Land Tax, to be raised in Great Britain, for the Service of the Year One thousand seven hundred and ninety.	The whole act.
30 Geo. 3 c. 3	Malt Duties Act 1790	An Act for continuing and granting to His Majesty certain Duties upon Malt, Mum, Cyder, and Perry, for the Service of the Year One thousand seven hundred and ninety.	The whole act.
30 Geo. 3 c. 5	Payment of Creditors (Scotland) Act 1790	An Act for continuing the Term of so much of an Act, made in the Twenty-third Year of the Reign of His present Majesty, as relates to the rendering the Payment of Creditors more equal and expeditious in that part of Great Britain called Scotland.	The whole act.
30 Geo. 3 c. 6	Mutiny Act 1790	An Act for punishing Mutiny and Desertion; and for the better Payment of the Army and their Quarters.	The whole act.
30 Geo. 3 c. 7	Marine Mutiny Act 1790	An Act for the Regulation of His Majesty's Marine Forces while on Shore.	The whole act.
30 Geo. 3 c. 9	Militia Pay Act 1790	An Act for defraying the Charge of Pay and Cloathing of the Militia, in that Part of Great Britain called England, for One Year, beginning the Twenty-fifth Day of March One thousand seven hundred and ninety.	The whole act.
30 Geo. 3 c. 11	Trade with America Act 1790	An Act the title of which begins with the words,—An Act to continue the Laws now in Force for regulating the Trade,—and ends with the words,—Inhabitants of the Countries belonging to the said United States.	The whole act.
30 Geo. 3 c. 13	Land Tax (Commissioners) Act 1790	An Act the title of which begins with the words,—An Act for appointing Commissioners to put in Execution an Act of this Session,—and ends with the words,—appointing Commissioners of the Land Tax.	The whole act.
30 Geo. 3 c. 15	Loans or Exchequer Bills Act 1790	An Act for raising a certain Sum of Money, by Loans or Exchequer Bills, for the Service of the Year One thousand seven hundred and ninety.	The whole act.
30 Geo. 3 c. 16	Loans or Exchequer Bills (No. 2) Act 1790	An Act for raising a further Sum of Money, by Loans or Exchequer Bills, for the Service of the Year One thousand seven hundred and ninety.	The whole act.
30 Geo. 3 c. 17	Exchequer, etc. Courts (Scotland) Act 1790	An Act for altering the Time appointed for holding the Summer Session in the Court of Session in Scotland; and for altering Whitsuntide and Lammas Terms in the Court of Exchequer in Scotland.	The whole act.
30 Geo. 3 c. 18	Continuance of Laws Act 1790	An Act the title of which begins with the words,—An Act to continue the several Laws therein mentioned,—and ends with the words,—ascertaining the Strength of Spirits by Clarke's Hydrometer.	The whole act.
30 Geo. 3 c. 19	Papists Act 1790	An Act for allowing further time for Inrollment of Deeds and Wills made by Papists, and for Relief of Protestant Purchasers.	The whole act.
30 Geo. 3 c. 23	Post Horse Duties Act 1790	An Act the title of which begins with the words,—An Act to continue, for a limited Time, an Act made in the Twenty-seventh Year,—and ends with the words,—Persons as should be willing to contract for the same.	The whole act.
30 Geo. 3 c. 24	Loans or Exchequer Bills Act 1790	An Act for enabling His Majesty to raise the sum of One Million, for the Uses and Purposes therein mentioned.	The whole act.
30 Geo. 3 c. 30	Lotteries Act 1790	An Act for granting to His Majesty a certain Sum of Money, to be raised by a Lottery.	The whole act.
30 Geo. 3 c. 31	Silver Plate Act 1790	An Act the title of which begins with the words,—An Act to alter so much of an Act, made in the Twelfth Year,—and ends with the words,—marking of Silver Wares.	Section Two.
30 Geo. 3 c. 32	Appropriation Act 1790	An Act the title of which begins with the words,—An Act for granting to His Majesty a certain Sum of Money out of the Consolidated Fund,—and ends with the words,—Supplies granted in this Session of Parliament.	The whole act.
30 Geo. 3 c. 33	Slave Trade Act 1790	An Act to amend and continue, for a limited Time, several Acts of Parliament for regulating the shipping and carrying Slaves in British Vessels from the Coast of Africa.	The whole act.
30 Geo. 3 c. 34	American Loyalists, etc. Act 1790	An Act the title of which begins with the words,—An Act for giving Relief to such Persons as have suffered in their Rights,—and ends with the words,—East Florida to the King of Spain.	The whole act.
30 Geo. 3 c. 35	Parliamentary Elections Act 1790	An Act to explain and amend an Act, passed in the Twentieth Year of the Reign of His present Majesty, intituled, An Act to enable the Knights of the Shire to serve in Parliament for that Part of Great Britain called England.	The whole act.
30 Geo. 3 c. 37	Excise Act 1790	An Act the title of which begins with the words,—An Act to continue Two Acts, made in the Twenty-eighth and Twenty-ninth Years,—and ends with the words,—and for amending the said Act, made in the Twenty-ninth Year of his present Majesty's Reign.	The whole act.
30 Geo. 3 c. 38	Retail of Liquors Act 1790	An Act for repealing the Duties upon Licences for retailing Wine and Sweets, and upon Licences for retailing distilled Spirituous Liquors, and for granting other Duties in lieu thereof.	Except so much of Section Fifteen as defines a Retailer of distilled Spirituous Liquors and strong Waters, and a retailing thereof.
30 Geo. 3 c. 39	Allowances to Distillers (Scotland) Act 1790	An Act for making Allowances to Distillers of Low Wines and Spirits from Malt, Corn, or Grain, in Scotland, in respect of the Duties imposed by an Act made in the Twenty-fourth Year of the Reign of His present Majesty.	The whole act.
30 Geo. 3 c. 42	Importation and Exportation Act 1790	An Act the title of which begins with the words,—An Act to continue, for a limited Time, certain Provisions,—and ends with the words,—prohibit the Importation thereof on the low Duties.	The whole act.
30 Geo. 3 c. 44	Annuity to Doctor Willis Act 1790	An Act to enable His Majesty to settle a certain Annuity on the Reverend Francis Willis, Doctor of Physick.	The whole act.
30 Geo. 3 c. 45	Tontine Annuities Act 1790	An Act the title of which begins with the words,—An Act for converting certain Annuities,—and ends with the words,—Shares so converted.	Sections One, Three to Eleven, Section Twelve to "depending thereon," Section Thirteen to "such Register," and Sections Fourteen, Seventeen to Nineteen, and Twenty-one to Twenty-three.
30 Geo. 3 c. 47	Transportation Act 1790	An Act for enabling His Majesty to authorize His Governor or Lieutenant Governor of such Places beyond the Seas, to which Felons or other Offenders may be transported, to remit the Sentences of such Offenders. — Repealed as to all Her Majesty's Dominions.	The whole act.
30 Geo. 3 c. 48	Treason Act 1790	An Act for discontinuing the Judgment which has been required by Law to be given against Women convicted of certain Crimes, and substituting another Judgment in lieu thereof.	Section Three.
30 Geo. 3 c. 50	Land Revenues of the Crown Act 1790	An Act the title of which begins with the words,—An Act to continue and amend an Act, made in the Twenty-sixth Year,—and ends with the words,—alienate Fee Farm and other unimproveable Rents.	The whole act.
31 Geo. 3 c. 2	Land Revenues of the Crown Act 1790	An Act for granting to His Majesty Additional Duties upon Malt.	The whole act.
31 Geo. 3 c. 3	Time for Entering into Recognisances Act 1791	An Act the title of which begins with the words,—An Act to give further Time to John Macbride,—and ends with the words,—Plymouth, in the County of Devon.	The whole act.
31 Geo. 3 c. 4	Importation and Exportation Act 1791	An Act the title of which begins with the words,—An Act to continue and amend so much of Two Acts, made in the last Session of Parliament,—and ends with the words,—prohibit the Importation thereof on the low Duties.	The whole act.
31 Geo. 3 c. 6	Land Tax Act 1791	An Act for granting an Aid to His Majesty by a Land Tax, to be raised in Great Britain for the Service of the Year One thousand seven hundred and ninety-one.	The whole act.
31 Geo. 3 c. 7	Malt Duties (No. 2) Act 1791	An Act for continuing and granting to His Majesty certain Duties upon Malt, Mum, Cider, and Perry, for the Service of the Year One thousand seven hundred and ninety-one.	The whole act.
31 Geo. 3 c. 9	Marine Mutiny Act 1791	An Act for the Regulation of His Majesty's Marine Forces while on Shore.	The whole act.
31 Geo. 3 c. 10	Expenses of His Majesty's Forces, India Act 1791	An Act the title of which begins with the words,—An Act for altering and amending so much of an Act, passed in the Twenty-eighth Year of His Majesty's Reign,—and ends with the words,—European Ships of the East India Company, therein specified.	The whole act.
31 Geo. 3 c. 12	Trade with America Act 1791	An Act the title of which begins with the words,—An Act to continue the Laws now in Force for regulating the Trade between,—and ends with the words,—Countries belonging to the said United States.	The whole act.
31 Geo. 3 c. 13	Mutiny Act 1791	An Act for punishing Mutiny and Desertion; and for the better Payment of the Army and their Quarters.	The whole act.
31 Geo. 3 c. 14	Land Tax (Commissioners) Act 1791	An Act the title of which begins with the words,—An Act for appointing Commissioners for putting in Execution an Act of this Session,—and ends with the words,—Year One thousand seven hundred and ninety-one.	The whole act.
31 Geo. 3 c. 16	Militia Pay Act 1791	An Act for defraying the Charge of Pay and Cloathing of the Militia, in that Part of Great Britain called England, for One Year, beginning the Twenty-fifth Day of March One thousand seven hundred and ninety-one.	The whole act.
31 Geo. 3 c. 28	Officers of Late Wine Licences Office Act 1791	An Act to enable His Majesty to make Compensation to the Officers of the late Wine Licence Office, for the Loss of their Offices.	The whole act.
31 Geo. 3 c. 31	Clergy Endowments (Canada) Act 1791	An Act the title of which begins with the words,—An Act to repeal certain Parts of an Act, passed in the Fourteenth Year,—and ends with the words,—Government of the said Province.	Except Sections Thirty-five, Thirty-eight to Forty, and Forty-three to Forty-five. Repealed as to all Her Majesty's Dominions.
31 Geo. 3 c. 32	Roman Catholic Relief Act 1791	An Act to relieve, upon Conditions, and under Restrictions, the Persons therein described, from certain Penalties and Disabilities to which Papists, or Persons professing the Popish Religion, are by Law subject.	Section Ten.
31 Geo. 3 c. 34	Annuity to Duke of Clarence Act 1791	An Act for enabling His Majesty to settle an Annuity of Twelve thousand Pounds on His Royal Highness the Duke of Clarence, during Pleasure.	The whole act.
31 Geo. 3 c. 40	East Indies Act 1791	An Act the title of which begins with the words,—An Act for establishing and confirming a certain Resolution,—and ends with the words,—Coasts of Coromandel and Malabar.	The whole act.
31 Geo. 3 c. 41	Appropriation Act 1791	An Act the title of which begins with the words,—An Act for granting to His Majesty certain Sums of Money,—and ends with the words,—Supplies granted in this Session of Parliament.	The whole act.
31 Geo. 3 c. 44	Ascertaining of Strength of Spirits Act 1791	An Act to continue the several Laws therein mentioned, so far as relates to the ascertaining the Strength of Spirits by Clarke's Hydrometer.	The whole act.
31 Geo. 3 c. 48	Loans or Exchequer Bills Act 1791	An Act for raising a certain Sum of Money, by Loans or Exchequer Bills, for the Service of the Year One thousand seven hundred and ninety-one.	The whole act.
31 Geo. 3 c. 49	Loans or Exchequer Bills (No. 2) Act 1791	An Act for raising a certain Sum of Money, by Loans or Exchequer Bills, for defraying the Publick Expenses occasioned by the Augmentation of His Majesty's Forces, in the Year One thousand seven hundred and ninety.	The whole act.
31 Geo. 3 c. 50	Loans or Exchequer Bills (No. 3) Act 1791	An Act for raising a further Sum of Money, by Loans or Exchequer Bills, for the Service of the Year One thousand seven hundred and ninety-one.	The whole act.
31 Geo. 3 c. 52	Pawnbrokers Act 1791	An Act to continue, for a limited Time, an Act passed in the Twenty-ninth Year of the Reign of His present Majesty, intituled An Act for further regulating the Trade or Business of Pawnbrokers.	The whole act.
31 Geo. 3 c. 53	Lottery Act 1791	An Act for granting to His Majesty a certain Sum of Money, to be raised by a Lottery.	The whole act.
31 Geo. 3 c. 54	Slave Trade Act 1791	An Act the title of which begins with the words,—An Act to continue, for a limited Time, and to amend an Act made in the last Session,—and ends with the words,—Coast of Africa.	The whole act.
32 Geo. 3 c. 3	Duties on Servants Act 1792	An Act for repealing the Duties on Female Servants.	The whole act.
32 Geo. 3 c. 4	Duties on Wagons, etc. Act 1792	An Act for repealing the Duties on Waggons, Wains, Carts, and other Carriages, granted by an Act made in the Twenty-third Year of the Reign of His present Majesty.	The whole act.
32 Geo. 3 c. 5	Land Tax Act 1792	An Act for granting an Aid to His Majesty by a Land Tax, to be raised in Great Britain, for the Service of the Year One thousand seven hundred and ninety-two.	The whole act.
32 Geo. 3 c. 6	Malt Duties Act 1792	An Act for repealing the Duties upon Malt, granted by an Act made in the Thirty-first Year of the Reign of His present Majesty, intituled An Act for granting to His Majesty additional Duties upon Malt.	The whole act.
32 Geo. 3 c. 7	Duties on Candles Act 1792	An Act for repealing certain Part of the Duty upon all Candles (except Wax and Spermaceti Candles).	The whole act.
32 Geo. 3 c. 8	Frauds in Excise Revenue Act 1792	An Act for the more effectual preventing of Frauds in the Revenue of Excise by Common Brewers.	The whole act.
32 Geo. 3 c. 13	Annuities to Duke, etc., of York Act 1792	An Act the title of which begins with the words,—An Act to enable His Majesty to make Provision,—and ends with the words,—in case the said Royal Highness shall survive him.	The whole act.
32 Geo. 3 c. 14	Trade with America Act 1792	An Act the title of which begins with the words,—An Act to continue the Laws now in Force for regulating the Trade,—and ends with the words,—Countries belonging to the said United States.	The whole act.
32 Geo. 3 c. 15	Loans of Exchequer Bills Act 1792	An Act for raising a certain Sum of Money, by Loans or Exchequer Bills, for the Service of the Year One thousand seven hundred and ninety-two.	The whole act.
32 Geo. 3 c. 16	Loans of Exchequer Bills (No. 2) Act 1792	An Act for raising a further Sum of Money, by Loans or Exchequer Bills, for the Service of the Year One thousand seven hundred and ninety-two.	The whole act.
32 Geo. 3 c. 17	Marine Mutiny Act 1792	An Act for the Regulation of His Majesty's Marine Forces while on Shore.	The whole act.
32 Geo. 3 c. 18	Malt Duties (No. 2) Act 1792	An Act for continuing and granting to His Majesty certain Duties upon Malt, Mum, Cyder, and Perry, for the Service of the Year One thousand seven hundred and ninety-two.	The whole act.
32 Geo. 3 c. 19	Mutiny Act 1792	An Act for punishing Mutiny and Desertion; and for the better Payment of the Army and their Quarters.	The whole act.
32 Geo. 3 c. 23	Land Tax (Commissioners) Act 1792	An Act the title of which begins with the words,—An Act for rectifying Mistakes in the Names of several of the Commissioners,—and ends with the words,—Service of the Year One thousand seven hundred and ninety-two.	The whole act.
32 Geo. 3 c. 26	Militia Pay Act 1792	An Act for defraying the Charge of the Pay and Cloathing of the Militia in that Part of Great Britain called England, for One Year, beginning the Twenty-fifth Day of March One thousand seven hundred and ninety-two.	The whole act.
32 Geo. 3 c. 28	Lottery Act 1792	An Act for granting to His Majesty a certain Sum of Money, to be raised by a Lottery.	The whole act.
32 Geo. 3 c. 35	Appropriation Act 1792	An Act the title of which begins with the words,—An Act for granting to His Majesty a certain Sum of Money,—and ends with the words,—Orders, lost, burnt, or otherwise destroyed.	The whole act.
32 Geo. 3 c. 36	Continuance of Laws Act 1792	An Act the title of which begins with the words,—An Act to continue several Laws therein mentioned,—and ends with the words,—Importation of Seal Skins, cured with Foreign Salt, free of Duty.	The whole act.
32 Geo. 3 c. 52	Slave Trade Act 1792	An Act to continue, for a limited Time, several Acts of Parliament for regulating the Shipping and carrying Slaves in British Vessels from the Coast of Africa.	The whole act.
32 Geo. 3 c. 56	Servants' Characters Act 1792	An Act for preventing the counterfeiting of Certificates of the Characters of Servants.	Section Seven.
32 Geo. 3 c. 57	Parish Apprentices Act 1792	An Act for the further Regulation of Parish Apprentices.	Section Ten, Section Twelve from "but" to "of such distress," and the following words in that Section,—"or for the payment of any sum or sums of money in lieu of a subsequent binding."
32 Geo. 3 c. 61	Indemnity to Proprietors, etc., of Newspapers Act 1792	An Act to indemnify Persons, being Proprietors, Printers, and Editors of Newspapers and other Publications, from certain Penalties incurred under several Acts therein mentioned, relative to Lotteries.	The whole act.
33 Geo. 3 c. 1	Circulation of Notes, etc., Issued in France Act 1793	An Act the title of which begins with the words,—An Act to prohibit the Circulation of Promissory,—and ends with the words,—any publick Authority in France.	The whole act.
33 Geo. 3 c. 3	Exportation (No. 2) Act 1793	An Act the title of which begins with the words,—An Act for indemnifying all Persons,—and ends with the words,—Importation of Corn, Meal, or Flour, on the Low Duties.	The whole act.
33 Geo. 3 c. 4	Aliens Act 1793	An Act for establishing Regulations respecting Aliens arriving in this Kingdom, or resident therein, in certain Cases.	The whole act.
33 Geo. 3 c. 6	Marine Mutiny Act 1793	An Act for the Regulation of His Majesty's Marine Forces while on Shore.	The whole act.
33 Geo. 3 c. 7	Land Tax Act 1793	An Act for granting an Aid to His Majesty by a Land Tax, to be raised in Great Britain, for the Service of the Year One thousand seven hundred and ninety-three.	The whole act.
33 Geo. 3 c. 9	Mutiny Act 1793	An Act for punishing Mutiny and Desertion; and for the better Payment of the Army and their Quarters.	The whole act.
33 Geo. 3 c. 10	Trade with America Act 1793	An Act the title of which begins with the words,—An Act to continue the Laws now in force for regulating the Trade,—and ends with the words,—Countries belonging to the said United States.	The whole act.
33 Geo. 3 c. 11	Malt Duties Act 1793	An Act for continuing and granting to His Majesty certain duties upon Malt, Mum, Cyder, and Perry, for the Service of the Year One thousand seven hundred and ninety-three.	The whole act.
33 Geo. 3 c. 17	Loans or Exchequer Bill Act 1793	An Act for raising a certain Sum of Money, by Loans or Exchequer Bills, for the Service of the Year One thousand seven hundred and ninety-three.	The whole act.
33 Geo. 3 c. 18	Loans or Exchequer Bill (No. 2) Act 1793	An Act for raising a further Sum of Money, by Loans or Exchequer Bills, for the Service of the Year One thousand seven hundred and ninety-three.	The whole act.
33 Geo. 3 c. 19	Militia Pay Act 1793	An Act the title of which begins with the words,—An Act for defraying the Charge of the Pay,—and ends with the words,—Adjutants who have served for a certain time in the Militia.	The whole act.
33 Geo. 3 c. 26	Supply of Seamen Act 1793	An Act for the better Supply of Mariners and Seamen to serve in His Majesty's Ships of War, and on Board Merchant Ships, and other trading Ships and Vessels during the present War.	The whole act.
33 Geo. 3 c. 27	Correspondence with Enemies Act 1793	An Act more effectually to prevent, during the present War between Great Britain and France, all Traitorous Correspondence with, or Aid or Assistance being given to, His Majesty's Enemies.	The whole act.
33 Geo. 3 c. 34	Prize Act 1793	An Act for the Relief of the Captors of Prizes, with respect to the bringing and landing certain Prize Goods in this Kingdom.	The whole act.
33 Geo. 3 c. 35	Poor Act 1793	An Act to explain and amend an Act, passed in the Twenty-second Year of the Reign of His present Majesty, for the better Relief and Employment of the Poor.	The whole act.
33 Geo. 3 c. 36	Fencibles Act 1793	An Act to establish certain Regulations respecting Officers and several Corps of Fencible Men, in that part of Great Britain called Scotland, and in certain other Corps which may be directed to be raised in Great Britain.	The whole act.
33 Geo. 3 c. 37	Bread Act 1793	An Act the title of which begins with the words,—An Act to amend an Act made in the Thirty-first Year of the Reign of His late Majesty,—and ends with the words,—Prosecutions directed by the said Act are to be brought.	The whole act.
33 Geo. 3 c. 40	Continuance of Laws Act 1793	An Act the title of which begins with the words,—An Act to continue several Laws relating to the landing Rum,—and ends with the words,—Manufactures of Flax and Cotton in Great Britain.	The whole act.
33 Geo. 3 c. 49	British Sailcloth, etc. Act 1793	An Act the title of which begins with the words,—An Act for further continuing and amending an Act made in the Ninth Year,—and ends with the words,—Salt Cloth imported into this Kingdom.	The whole act.
33 Geo. 3 c. 51	Amendment of c. 29 of this Session Act 1793	An Act for rendering more effectual an Act of the present Session of Parliament, intituled An Act for enabling His Majesty to direct the issue of Exchequer Bills to a limited Amount, for the Purposes and in the Manner therein mentioned.	The whole act.
33 Geo. 3 c. 59	Excise Act 1793	An Act to continue certain Duties of Excise on Foreign Spirits imported into this Kingdom, and to suspend, for a Time to be limited, the Duties of Excise therein mentioned.	The whole act.
33 Geo. 3 c. 61	Distilleries, etc. (Scotland) Act 1793	An Act for the Regulation of Distilleries in Scotland, and the Exportation of British made Spirits from England to Scotland, and from Scotland to England, for a limited Time.	The whole act.
33 Geo. 3 c. 62	Lottery Act 1793	An Act for granting to His Majesty a certain Sum of Money, to be raised by a Lottery.	The whole act.
33 Geo. 3 c. 67	Shipping Offences Act 1793	An Act for better preventing Offences in obstructing, destroying, or damaging Ships or other Vessels, and in obstructing Seamen, Keelmen, Casters, and Ship Carpenters, from pursuing their lawful Occupations.	The last Section.
33 Geo. 3 c. 68	Wales, Chester, etc. (Courts) Act 1793	An Act the title of which begins with the words,—An Act for remedying Inconveniences attending certain Proceedings in the Courts of Great Sessions in Wales,—and ends with the words,—County Courts in Wales.	Sections One and Two.
33 Geo. 3 c. 69	Excise (Scotland) Act 1793	An Act for repealing the Duties on Coals, Culm, and Cinders brought or carried Coastwise into Scotland; and for granting other Duties on Licences to sell certain distilled Spirituous Liquors in lieu thereof.	The whole act.
33 Geo. 3 c. 71	Post Horse Duties Act 1793	An Act the title of which begins with the words,—An Act for further continuing, for a limited Time, an Act made in the Twenty-seventh Year,—and ends with the words,—to such Persons as should be willing to contract for the same.	The whole act.
33 Geo. 3 c. 72	Appropriation Act 1793	An Act the title of which begins with the words,—An Act for granting to His Majesty a certain Sum of Money out of the Consolidated Fund,—and ends with the words,—Supplies granted in this Session of Parliament.	The whole act.
33 Geo. 3 c. 73	Slave Trade Act 1793	An Act to continue, for a limited Time, and to amend several Acts of Parliament for regulating the shipping and carrying Slaves in British Vessels from the Coast of Africa.	The whole act.
33 Geo. 3 c. 74	Payment of Creditors (Scotland) Act 1793	An Act for rendering the Payment of Creditors more equal and expeditious in that part of Great Britain called Scotland.	The whole act.
33 Geo. 3 c. 77	Annuity (Lord Rodney) Act 1793	An Act the title of which begins with the words,—An Act for further settling and securing a certain Annuity,—and ends with the words,—Lord Rodney to His Majesty and the Publick.	Sections Three to Five.
34 Geo. 3 c. 5	Trade with America Act 1794	An Act the title of which begins with the words,—An Act to continue the Laws now in force for regulating the Trade,—and ends with the words,—Countries belonging to the said United States.	The whole act.
34 Geo. 3 c. 6	Marine Mutiny Act 1794	An Act for the Regulation of His Majesty's Marine Forces while on Shore.	The whole act.
34 Geo. 3 c. 7	Malt Duties Act 1794	An Act for continuing and granting to His Majesty certain Duties upon Malt, Mum, Cyder, and Perry, for the Service of the Year One thousand seven hundred and ninety-four.	The whole act.
34 Geo. 3 c. 8	Land Tax Act 1794	An Act for granting an Aid to His Majesty by a Land Tax, to be raised in Great Britain, for the Service of the Year One thousand seven hundred and ninety-four.	The whole act.
34 Geo. 3 c. 9	Aid to Government of France Act 1794	An Act the title of which begins with the words,—An Act for preventing Money or Effects in the hands of His Majesty's Subjects,—and ends with the words,—Benefit of the Individual Owners thereof.	The whole act.
34 Geo. 3 c. 10	Stamps Act 1794	An Act for repealing the Stamp Duties on Gloves and Mittens sold by Retail.	The whole act.
34 Geo. 3 c. 11	Stamps (No. 2) Act 1794	An Act for repealing the Duties on the Registry of Burials, Births, Marriages, and Christenings.	The whole act.
34 Geo. 3 c. 13	Mutiny Act 1794	An Act for punishing Mutiny and Desertion; and for the better Payment of the Army and their Quarters.	The whole act.
34 Geo. 3 c. 16	Militia Act 1794	An Act for augmenting the Militia.	The whole act.
34 Geo. 3 c. 22	Fishery Act 1794	An Act for allowing Vessels employed in the Greenland and Whale Fishery to complete their full Number of Men, at certain Ports, for a limited Time.	The whole act.
34 Geo. 3 c. 28	Loans or Exchequer Bills Act 1794	An Act for raising a certain Sum of Money, by Loans or Exchequer Bills, for the Service of the Year One thousand seven hundred and ninety-four.	The whole act.
34 Geo. 3 c. 29	Loans or Exchequer Bills (No. 2) Act 1794	An Act for raising a further Sum of Money, by Loans or Exchequer Bills, for the Service of the Year One thousand seven hundred and ninety-four.	The whole act.
34 Geo. 3 c. 30	Militia Pay Act 1794	An Act for defraying the Charge of the Pay and Clothing of the Militia, in that Part of Great Britain called England, for One Year, beginning the Twenty-fifth Day of March One thousand seven hundred and ninety-four.	The whole act.
34 Geo. 3 c. 31	Volunteer Corps Act 1794	An Act for encouraging and disciplining such Corps or Companies of Men, as shall voluntarily enroll themselves for the Defence of their Counties, Towns, or Coasts, or for the General Defence of the Kingdom, during the present War.	The whole act.
34 Geo. 3 c. 32	Stamp Duties Act 1794	An Act for enabling the Commissioners of the Stamp Duties to stamp Bills of Exchange and Notes in certain Cases.	The whole act.
34 Geo. 3 c. 35	Governors, etc., of West Indies Islands Act 1794	An Act for indemnifying Governors, Lieutenant Governors, and other Persons acting as such in the West India Islands, who have permitted the Importation and Exportation of Goods and Commodities in Foreign Bottoms.	The whole act.
34 Geo. 3 c. 36	Continuance of Laws Act 1794	An Act to continue several Laws relating to the Exportation of Culm to Lisbon, and to the ascertaining the Strength of Spirits by Clarke's Hydrometer.	The whole act.
34 Geo. 3 c. 40	Lottery Act 1794	An Act for granting to His Majesty a certain Sum of Money, to be raised by a Lottery.	The whole act.
34 Geo. 3 c. 43	Enlistment Act 1794	An Act the title of which begins with the words,—An Act to enable Subjects of France to enlist as Soldiers,—and ends with the words,—under certain Restrictions.	The whole act.
34 Geo. 3 c. 44	Courts, Newfoundland, etc. Act 1794	An Act the title of which begins with the words,—An Act to continue an Act, made in the last Session,—and ends with the words,—Officers of the Customs in the Island of Newfoundland.	The whole act.
34 Geo. 3 c. 46	Common Pleas of Lancaster Act 1794	An Act for taking of Special Bail in Actions and Suits depending in the Court of Common Pleas of the County Palatine of Lancaster.	The whole act.
34 Geo. 3 c. 49	Appropriation Act 1794	An Act the title of which begins with the words,—An Act for granting to His Majesty a certain Sum of Money out of the Consolidated Fund,—and ends with the words,—Supplies granted in this Session of Parliament.	The whole act.
34 Geo. 3 c. 54	Habeas Corpus Suspension Act 1794	An Act to impower His Majesty to secure and detain such Persons as His Majesty shall suspect are conspiring against His Person and Government.	The whole act.
34 Geo. 3 c. 55	Duty on Tobacco Act 1794	An Act for saving to His Majesty the Duty of new Subsidy on Tobacco imported into that Part of Great Britain called Scotland.	The whole act.
34 Geo. 3 c. 56	Navy and Victualling Bills Act 1794	An Act for extending the Time limited by an Act of this Session for delivering in Navy and Victualling Bills.	The whole act.
34 Geo. 3 c. 57	Bankrupts Act 1794	An Act for further continuing an Act made in the Fifth Year of the Reign of His late Majesty, intituled An Act to prevent the committing of Frauds by Bankrupts.	The whole act.
34 Geo. 3 c. 59	Audit of Public Accounts Act 1794	An Act the title of which begins with the words,—An Act for extending the Provisions of an Act, passed in the Twenty-fifth Year,—and ends with the words,—Commissioners of Sick and Hurt.	The whole act.
34 Geo. 3 c. 60	Removal of Convicts Act 1794	An Act to continue so much of several Laws, respecting the Transportation and Imprisonment of Offenders, as relates to the Removal of Offenders to temporary Places of Confinement.	The whole act.
34 Geo. 3 c. 61	Observance of Lord's Day by Bakers Act 1794	An Act for the better observance of the Lord's Day, by Persons exercising the Trade of Bakers.	The whole act.
34 Geo. 3 c. 62	Loans or Exchequer Bills (No. 3) Act 1794	An Act for enabling His Majesty to raise the Sum of Two millions five hundred thousand Pounds for the Uses and Purposes therein mentioned.	The whole act.
34 Geo. 3 c. 69	Insolvent Debtors' Discharge Act 1794	An Act for the Discharge of certain Insolvent Debtors.	The whole act.
34 Geo. 3 c. 70	Customs (No. 2) Act 1794	An Act to exempt Ships or Vessels of War, taken as Prize, from Payment of Duty.	The whole act.
34 Geo. 3 c. 71	Supply of Certain Islands with Corn Act 1794	An Act for supplying such of the French Islands, as may be in His Majesty's Possession, with the several Sorts of Corn, Meal, Flour, and Biscuits, necessary for the Maintenance of the Inhabitants of the said Islands.	The whole act.
34 Geo. 3 c. 79	Effects of Residents in France Act 1794	An Act for more effectually preserving Money or Effects, in the Hands of His Majesty's Subjects, belonging to, or disposeable by, Persons resident in France, for the Benefit of the Individual Owners thereof.	The whole act.
34 Geo. 3 c. 80	Slave Trade Act 1794	An Act to continue, for a limited Time, and to amend an Act, passed in the last Session of Parliament, intituled An Act to continue for a limited Time, and to amend several Acts of Parliament for regulating the shipping and carrying Slaves in British Vessels from the Coast of Africa.	The whole act.
34 Geo. 3 c. 82	Aliens Act 1794	An Act to continue an Act, made in the last Session of Parliament, intituled An Act for establishing Regulations respecting Aliens arriving in this Kingdom, or resident therein, in certain Cases.	The whole act.
35 Geo. 3 c. 1	Duties on Malt, etc. Act 1795	An Act for continuing and granting to His Majesty certain Duties upon Malt, Mum, Cyder, and Perry, for the Service of the Year One thousand seven hundred and ninety-five.	The whole act.
35 Geo. 3 c. 2	Land Tax Act 1795	An Act for granting an Aid to His Majesty by a Land Tax, to be raised in Great Britain, for the Service of the Year One thousand seven hundred and ninety-five.	The whole act.
35 Geo. 3 c. 3	Habeas Corpus Suspension Act 1795	An Act to continue, for a limited Time, an Act, made in the last Session of Parliament, intituled An Act to impower His Majesty to secure and detain such Persons as His Majesty shall suspect are conspiring against His Person and Government.	The whole act.
35 Geo. 3 c. 4	Exportation and Importation Act 1795	An Act for enabling His Majesty to prohibit the Exportation, and permit the Importation, of Corn, and for allowing the Importation of other Articles of Provision, for a limited Time, without Payment of Duty.	The whole act.
35 Geo. 3 c. 5	Manning of the Navy Act 1795	An Act for raising a certain Number of Men, in the several Counties in England, for the Service of His Majesty's Navy.	The whole act.
35 Geo. 3 c. 6	Mutiny Act 1795	An Act for punishing Mutiny and Desertion; and for the better Payment of the Army and their Quarters.	The whole act.
35 Geo. 3 c. 7	Marine Mutiny Act 1795	An Act for the Regulation of His Majesty's Marine Forces while on Shore.	The whole act.
35 Geo. 3 c. 9	Manning of the Navy (No. 2) Act 1795	An Act for procuring a Supply of Men from the several Ports of this Kingdom, for the Service of His Majesty's Navy.	The whole act.
35 Geo. 3 c. 16	Militia, Derbyshire Act 1795	An Act for applying certain Sums of Money, raised in the County of Derby by virtue of several Acts of Parliament made respecting the Militia of this Kingdom.	The whole act.
35 Geo. 3 c. 17	Land Tax (No. 2) Act 1795	An Act the title of which begins with the words,—An Act for appointing Commissioners to put in Execution an Act of this Session,—and ends with the words,—Commissioners of the Land Tax.	The whole act.
35 Geo. 3 c. 19	Manning of the Navy (No. 3) Act 1795	An Act for rendering more effectual an Act of the present Session of Parliament, intituled An Act for raising a certain Number of Men, in the several Counties in England, for the Service of His Majesty's Navy.	The whole act.
35 Geo. 3 c. 21	Loans or Exchequer Bills Act 1795	An Act for raising a certain Sum of Money, by Loans or Exchequer Bills, for the Service of the Year One thousand seven hundred and ninety-five.	The whole act.
35 Geo. 3 c. 22	Loans or Exchequer Bills (No. 2) Act 1795	An Act for raising a further Sum of Money, by Loans or Exchequer Bills, for the Service of the Year One thousand seven hundred and ninety-five.	The whole act.
35 Geo. 3 c. 24	Aliens Act 1795	An Act further to continue an Act, made in the Thirty-third Year of His Majesty's Reign, intituled An Act for establishing Regulations respecting Aliens arriving in this Kingdom, or resident therein, in certain Cases.	The whole act.
35 Geo. 3 c. 25	Courts (Newfoundland) Act 1795	An Act for further continuing an Act, made in the Thirty-third Year of the Reign of His present Majesty, intituled An Act for establishing Courts of Judicature in the Island of Newfoundland, and the Islands adjacent.	The whole act.
35 Geo. 3 c. 26	Trade with America Act 1795	An Act the title of which begins with the words,—An Act to continue the Laws now in force for regulating the Trade,—and ends with the words,—the said United States.	The whole act.
35 Geo. 3 c. 29	Manning of the Navy (No. 4) Act 1795	An Act for raising a certain number of Men, in the several Counties, Stewartries, Royal Burghs, and Towns, in that Part of Great Britain called Scotland, for the Service of His Majesty's Navy.	The whole act.
35 Geo. 3 c. 33	Militia Pay Act 1795	An Act for defraying the Charge of the Pay and Cloathing of the Militia in that Part of Great Britain called England, for One Year, beginning the Twenty-fifth Day of March One thousand seven hundred and ninety-five.	The whole act.
35 Geo. 3 c. 34	Manning of the Navy (No. 5) Act 1795	An Act for enabling the Magistrates, in the several Counties in Great Britain, to raise and levy, under certain Regulations, such able-bodied and idle Persons as shall be found within the said Counties, to serve in His Majesty's Navy.	The whole act.
35 Geo. 3 c. 35	Militia Allowance Act 1795	An Act for making Allowances, in certain Cases, to Subaltern Officers of the Militia, in Time of Peace.	The whole act.
35 Geo. 3 c. 36	Lottery Act 1795	An Act for granting to His Majesty a certain Sum of Money, to be raised by a Lottery.	The whole act.
35 Geo. 3 c. 37	Loans or Exchequer Bills (No. 3) Act 1795	An Act for enabling His Majesty to raise the Sum of Two millions five hundred thousand Pounds for the Uses and Purposes therein mentioned.	The whole act.
35 Geo. 3 c. 57	Indemnity to Certain Governors, etc. Act 1795	An Act to indemnify Governors, Lieutenant Governors, and Persons acting as such, in the West India Islands, who have permitted the Importation and Exportation of Goods and Commodities in Foreign Bottoms.	The whole act.
35 Geo. 3 c. 58	Registry of Boats, etc. Act 1795	An Act for requiring all Boats, Barges, and other Vessels, of certain Descriptions, used on Navigable Rivers, and on Inland Navigations, in Great Britain, to be registered.	The whole act.
35 Geo. 3 c. 60	Militia (Staffordshire) Act 1795	An Act for applying certain Sums of Money raised in the County of Stafford by virtue of several Acts of Parliament made respecting the Militia of this Kingdom.	The whole act.
35 Geo. 3 c. 62	Post Office Act 1795	An Act the title of which begins with the words,—An Act to enable His Majesty's Postmaster General to open and return certain Letters,—and ends with the words,—in the said General Post Office.	The whole act.
35 Geo. 3 c. 64	Quartering of Soldiers Act 1795	An Act for increasing the Rates of Subsistence to be paid to Innkeepers, and others, on Quartering Soldiers, for a limited Time.	The whole act.
35 Geo. 3 c. 65	Parliamentary Elections Act 1795	An Act to prevent unnecessary Delay in the Execution of Writs for the Election of Members to serve in Parliament for that Part of Great Britain called Scotland.	The whole act.
35 Geo. 3 c. 88	Insolvent Debtor's Discharge Act 1795	An Act to remedy certain Omissions in an Act, passed in the last Session of Parliament, intituled An Act for the Discharge of certain Insolvent Debtors.	The whole act.
35 Geo. 3 c. 90	Slave Trade Act 1795	An Act for regulating the Shipping and carrying Slaves in British Vessels from the Coast of Africa.	The whole act.
35 Geo. 3 c. 98	Drawback Act 1795	An Act for allowing further Time for the Payment of the Drawback on China Ware, imported by the East India Company before the First Day of July One thousand seven hundred and ninety-five.	The whole act.
35 Geo. 3 c. 99	Papists Act 1795	An Act for allowing further Time for Inrolment of Deeds and Wills made by Papists, and for Relief of Protestant Purchasers.	The whole act.
35 Geo. 3 c. 100	Importation (No. 2) Act 1795	An Act for permitting the Importation of Organzined Thrown Silk, Flax, and Flax Seed, into this Kingdom, in Ships or Vessels belonging to any Kingdom or State in Amity with His Majesty, for a limited Time.	The whole act.
35 Geo. 3 c. 101	Poor Removal Act 1795	An Act to prevent the Removal of Poor Persons, until they shall become actually chargeable.	Section Two from "Provided that nothing" to end of that Section, Section Three, except the Proviso, Section Four to "incapacitated to pursue," and the last Section.
35 Geo. 3 c. 102	Weights and Measures Act 1795	An Act for the more effectual Prevention of the Use of defective Weights, and of false and unequal Balances.	Section Seven.
35 Geo. 3 c. 112	Hair Powder Certificates, etc. Act 1795	An Act the title of which begins with the words,—An Act for allowing further Time for Persons,—and ends with the words,—Inland Navigations, in Great Britain, to be registered.	The whole act.
35 Geo. 3 c. 113	Sale of Beer Act 1795	An Act for the more effectual Prevention of selling Ale, and other Liquors, by Persons not duly licensed.	From the beginning to "or Offenders: And," Section One from "so much" to "Ninety-five," and Sections Thirteen and Fifteen.
35 Geo. 3 c. 115	Importation (No. 3) Act 1795	An Act for allowing, for a limited Time, the Importation of Goods from India and China, and other Parts within the Limits of the exclusive Trade of the East India Company, in Ships not of British-built, nor registered as such, and for the Exportation of Goods from Great Britain by the same Ships, under certain Restrictions.	The whole act.
35 Geo. 3 c. 116	Excise (No. 6) Act 1795	An Act to remove Doubts arising from the Construction of certain Acts of this Session of Parliament respecting the Duties of Excise thereby granted on Wash, Coffee, Cocoa Nuts, Foreign Spirits, Wines, and Sweets.	The whole act.
35 Geo. 3 c. 119	Making of Spirits from Wheat, etc. Act 1795	An Act the title of which begins with the words,—An Act to prohibit, for a limited Time, the making of Low Wines or Spirits from Wheat,—and ends with the words,—Payment of Duty.	The whole act.
35 Geo. 3 c. 120	Appropriation Act 1795	An Act for granting to His Majesty a certain Sum of Money out of the Consolidated Fund, for the Service of the Year One thousand seven hundred and ninety-five; and for further appropriating the Supplies granted in this Session of Parliament.	The whole act.
35 Geo. 3 c. 123	Small Debts (Scotland) Act 1795	An Act for the more easy and expeditious Recovery of Small Debts, and determining Small Causes arising out of Personal Contract or Obligation, in that Part of Great Britain called Scotland.	The whole act.
35 Geo. 3 c. 124	Woolcombers Act 1795	An Act to enable Woolcombers to exercise Trades in any Town or Place in Great Britain.	The whole act.
35 Geo. 3 c. 127	Relief of Traders of Grenada, etc. Act 1795	An Act for enabling His Majesty to direct the Issue of Exchequer Bills to a limited Amount, for the Purposes, and in the Manner therein mentioned.	The whole act.
35 Geo. 3 c. 129	Prince of Wales Act 1795	An Act the title of which begins with the words,—An Act for enabling His Majesty to settle an Annuity on His Royal Highness the Prince of Wales,—and ends with the words,—Mode of Expenditure of the said Revenue.	The whole act.
35 Geo. 3 c. 130	Princess of Wales Act 1795	An Act for the better enabling His Majesty to make Provision for a sure and certain Jointure for Her Royal Highness the Princess of Wales, for the Term of Her Life.	The whole act.
36 Geo. 3 c. 1	Duties on Malt, etc. Act 1795	An Act for continuing and granting to His Majesty certain Duties upon Malt, Mum, Cyder, and Perry, for the Service of the Year One thousand seven hundred and ninety-six.	The whole act.
36 Geo. 3 c. 2	Land Tax Act 1795	An Act for granting an Aid to His Majesty by a Land Tax, to be raised in Great Britain, for the Service of the Year One thousand seven hundred and ninety-six.	The whole act.
36 Geo. 3 c. 3	Exportation and Importation Act 1795	An Act to prohibit the Exportation of Corn, Meal, Flour, and Potatoes, and to permit the Importation of Corn, and other Articles of Provision, for a limited Time, in any Ships whatever, without Payment of Duty.	The whole act.
36 Geo. 3 c. 4	Importation Act 1795	An Act to continue an Act for permitting the Importation of Organzined Thrown Silk, Flax, and Flax Seed, into this Kingdom, in Ships or Vessels belonging to any Kingdom or State in Amity with His Majesty, for a limited Time.	The whole act.
36 Geo. 3 c. 5	Exportation Act 1795	An Act to prohibit the Exportation of Candles, Tallow, and Soap, for a limited Time.	The whole act.
36 Geo. 3 c. 6	Making of Starch Act 1795	An Act to prohibit, for a limited Time, the making of Starch, Hair Powder, and Blue, from Wheat, and other Articles of Food; and for lowering the Duties on the Importation of Starch, and of other Articles made thereof.	The whole act.
36 Geo. 3 c. 7	Treason Act 1795	An Act for the Safety and Preservation of His Majesty's Person and Government against treasonable and seditious Practices and Attempts.	Sections Two to Nine.
36 Geo. 3 c. 9	Passage of Grain Act 1795	An Act to prevent Obstructions to the free Passage of Grain within the Kingdom.	Sections Three to Five.
36 Geo. 3 c. 20	Distillation from Wheat, etc., Prohibition Act 1795	An Act the title of which begins with the words, — An Act to continue, for a further limited Time, an Act, made in the last Session, — and ends with the words, — Spirits from Molasses of the Manufacture of this Kingdom, or from Sugar or Potatoes.	The whole act.
36 Geo. 3 c. 21	Bounties Act 1795	An Act the title of which begins with the words, — An Act for allowing Bounties for a limited Time, on the Importation, — and ends with the words, — Delivery of the same out of Warehouse for Home Consumption.	The whole act.
36 Geo. 3 c. 24	Mutiny (No. 2) Act 1795	An Act for punishing Mutiny and Desertion; and for the better Payment of the Army and their Quarters.	The whole act.
36 Geo. 3 c. 28	Marine Mutiny Act 1796	An Act for the Regulation of His Majesty's Marine Forces while on Shore.	The whole act.
36 Geo. 3 c. 29	Exchequer Bills Act 1796	An Act for raising a certain Sum of Money by Loans or Exchequer Bills, for the Service of the Year One thousand seven hundred and ninety-six.	The whole act.
36 Geo. 3 c. 30	Exchequer Bills (No. 2) Act 1796	An Act for raising a further Sum of Money, by Loans or Exchequer Bills, for the Service of the Year One thousand seven hundred and ninety-six.	The whole act.
36 Geo. 3 c. 31	Loans or Exchequer Bills Act 1796	An Act for enabling His Majesty to raise the Sum of Two millions five hundred thousand Pounds for the Uses and Purposes therein mentioned.	The whole act.
36 Geo. 3 c. 32	Indemnity to Governors of West Indies Act 1796	An Act for indemnifying Governors, Lieutenant Governors, and Persons acting as such, in the West India Islands, who have permitted the Importation and Exportation of Goods and Commodities in Foreign Bottoms.	The whole act.
36 Geo. 3 c. 36	Quartering of Soldiers Act 1796	An Act for increasing the Rates of Subsistence to be paid to Innkeepers and others for quartering Soldiers.	The whole act.
36 Geo. 3 c. 37	Courts (Newfoundland) Act 1796	An Act for further continuing an Act, made in the Thirty-third Year of the Reign of His present Majesty, intituled An Act for establishing Courts of Judicature in the Island of Newfoundland, and the Islands adjacent.	The whole act.
36 Geo. 3 c. 40	Continuance of Laws Act 1796	An Act the title of which begins with the words, — An Act to continue several Laws relating to the granting further Encouragement to the Importation of Naval Stores, — and ends with the words, — Duties on Spirits made in Scotland, and imported into England.	The whole act.
36 Geo. 3 c. 41	Militia Pay Act 1796	An Act for defraying the Charge of the Pay and Cloathing of the Militia, in that Part of Great Britain called England, for One Year, beginning the Twenty-fifth Day of March One thousand seven hundred and ninety-six.	The whole act.
36 Geo. 3 c. 52	Legacy Duty Act 1796	An Act for repealing certain Duties on Legacies and Shares of Personal Estates; and for granting other Duties thereon, in certain Cases.	Sections Forty, Forty-five, and Forty-six, and, except as regards Annuities the duty on which became payable on or before the 19th day of May 1853, so much of the Schedule as contains Tables of the values of annuities and Rules for inferring the values of annuities.
36 Geo. 3 c. 56	Bounties Act 1796	An Act the title of which begins with the words, — An Act for amending an Act, made in this present Session, — and ends with the words, — or for promoting the Delivery of the same out of Warehouse for Home Consumption.	The whole act.
36 Geo. 3 c. 58	Trade with America Act 1796	An Act the title of which begins with the words, — An Act to continue the Laws now in force for regulating the Trade, — and ends with the words, — Countries belonging to the said United States.	The whole act.
36 Geo. 3 c. 60	Metal Button Act 1796	An Act to regulate the making and vending of Metal Buttons; and to prevent the Purchasers thereof from being deceived in the real Quality of such Buttons.	Section Seventeen.
36 Geo. 3 c. 80	Stamps Act 1796	An Act for repealing the Stamp Duties on Licences to sell Gloves and Mittens by Retail.	The whole act.
36 Geo. 3 c. 81	Importation Act 1796	An Act for allowing the Importation of Molasses from any country in British Ships or Vessels, in the same Manner as Molasses may be imported in Ships in Amity with His Majesty, for a limited Time.	The whole act.
36 Geo. 3 c. 83	Curates, etc. Act 1796	An Act the title of which begins with the words, — An Act for the further Support and Maintenance of Curates, — and ends with the words, — Avoidance of other Benefices.	The whole act.
36 Geo. 3 c. 84	Post Horse Duties Act 1796	An Act the title of which begins with the words, — An Act for further continuing, for a limited Time, an Act, made in the Twenty-seventh Year, — and ends with the words, — Persons as should be willing to contract for the same.	The whole act.
36 Geo. 3 c. 89	Land Tax Act 1796	An Act the title of which begins with the words, — An Act for assessing the Commissioners, Clerks, and other Officers of the Duties on Salt, — and ends with the words, — Dutchy Liberty in the Strand, in the County of Middlesex.	The whole act.
36 Geo. 3 c. 104	Lottery Act 1796	An Act for granting to His Majesty a certain Sum of Money, to be raised by a Lottery.	The whole act.
36 Geo. 3 c. 106	Drawback Act 1796	An Act the title of which begins with the words, — An Act to amend an Act, made in the last Session, — and ends with the words, — Bounty on refined Sugars exported in any other than British Ships.	The whole act.
36 Geo. 3 c. 107	Longitude at Sea Act 1796	An Act for continuing the Encouragement and Reward of Persons making certain Discoveries for finding the Longitude at Sea, or making other useful Discoveries and Improvements in Navigation, and for making Experiments relating thereto.	The whole act.
36 Geo. 3 c. 108	Continuance of Laws (No. 2) Act 1796	An Act the title of which begins with the words, — An Act to continue several Laws therein mentioned relating to the better Encouragement of the making of Sail Cloth in Great Britain, — and ends with the words, — Bounty on the Exportation of British-made Cordage.	The whole act.
36 Geo. 3 c. 109	Aliens Act 1796	An Act further to continue an Act, made in the Thirty-third Year of the Reign of His present Majesty, intituled An Act for establishing Regulations respecting Aliens arriving in this Kingdom, or resident therein, in certain Cases.	The whole act.
36 Geo. 3 c. 112	Registry of Ships Act 1796	An Act the title of which begins with the words, — An Act for authorizing His Majesty to order the registering, — and ends with the words, — entitled to be registered according to the existing Laws in that Behalf.	The whole act.
36 Geo. 3 c. 115	Manning of the Navy Act 1796	An Act to enforce the due Execution of an Act, passed in the last Session of Parliament, intituled An Act for raising a certain number of Men in the several Counties in England, for the Service of His Majesty's Navy.	The whole act.
36 Geo. 3 c. 116	Militia Allowances Act 1796	An Act for making Allowances, in certain cases, to Subaltern Officers of the Militia, in Time of Peace.	The whole act.
36 Geo. 3 c. 120	East India Company Act 1796	An Act for enabling the East India Company to perform an Engagement entered into by them with William Salicetti, Gentleman, respecting the Importation of Cotton from the East Indies.	The whole act.
36 Geo. 3 c. 126	Appropriation Act 1796	An Act for granting to His Majesty a certain Sum of Money out of the Consolidated Fund, for the Service of the Year One thousand seven hundred and ninety-six; and for further appropriating the Supplies granted in this Session of Parliament.	The whole act.
37 Geo. 3 c. 1	Duties on Malt, etc. Act 1796	An Act for continuing and granting to His Majesty certain Duties upon Malt, Mum, Cyder, and Perry, for the Service of the Year One thousand seven hundred and ninety-seven.	The whole act.
37 Geo. 3 c. 2	Land Tax (No. 2) Act 1796	An Act for granting an Aid to His Majesty by a Land Tax, to be raised in Great Britain, for the Service of the Year One thousand seven hundred and ninety-seven.	The whole act.
37 Geo. 3 c. 4	Manning of the Army and Navy Act 1796	An Act for raising a certain Number of Men, in the several Counties in England, for the Service of His Majesty's Army and Navy.	The whole act.
37 Geo. 3 c. 5	Manning of the Army and Navy (Scotland) Act 1796	An Act for raising a certain Number of Men, in the several Counties, Stewartries, Royal Burghs, and Towns, in that Part of Great Britain called Scotland, for the Service of His Majesty's Army and Navy.	The whole act.
37 Geo. 3 c. 6	Provisional Cavalry Act 1796	An Act for enabling His Majesty to raise a certain Number of Cavalry, to be embodied, in case of Necessity, for the Defence of these Kingdoms.	The whole act.
37 Geo. 3 c. 7	Exportation and Importation Act 1796	An Act the title of which begins with the words,—An Act to continue for a limited Time, and amend an Act made in the last Session,—and ends with the words,—Distillation of Low Wines and Spirits.	The whole act.
37 Geo. 3 c. 8	Importation (No. 3) Act 1796	An Act to continue for a limited Time an Act made in the Thirty-fifth Year of the Reign of His present Majesty, for permitting the Importation of Organzined Thrown Silk, Flax, and Flax Seed into this Kingdom, in Ships or Vessels belonging to any Kingdom or State in Amity with His Majesty.	The whole act.
37 Geo. 3 c. 12	Merchandise in Neutral Ships Act 1796	An Act to continue several Acts, made in the Thirty-third and Thirty-sixth Years of His present Majesty's Reign, respecting the Admission of certain Articles of Merchandize in Neutral Ships, and the issuing of Orders in Council for that Purpose, for a limited Time.	The whole act.
37 Geo. 3 c. 21	Cape of Good Hope Trade Act 1796	An Act authorising His Majesty, for a limited Time, to make Regulations respecting the Trade and Commerce to and from the Cape of Good Hope.	The whole act.
37 Geo. 3 c. 23	Provisional Cavalry (No. 2) Act 1796	An Act to continue and amend an Act, made in this present Session of Parliament, intituled An Act for enabling His Majesty to raise a provisional Force of Cavalry, to be embodied, in case of Necessity, for the Defence of these Kingdoms.	The whole act.
37 Geo. 3 c. 24	Manning of the Army and Navy (No. 2) Act 1796	An Act to amend and enforce so much of an Act, made in this present Session of Parliament, intituled An Act for raising a certain Number of Men in the several Counties in England, for the Service of His Majesty's Army and Navy.	The whole act.
37 Geo. 3 c. 25	Militia (Tower Hamlets) Act 1796	An Act for the better raising and ordering the Militia Forces of the Tower Hamlets, in the County of Middlesex.	Section One from "and that, from and after the passing of this Act, the" to end of that Section, Sections Two, Four, Six, Section Nine so far as relates to the declaration therein referred to, and the rest of the Act so far as it relates to property qualifications of officers of militia.
37 Geo. 3 c. 27	Loans to Grenada and Saint Vincent Traders Act 1796	An Act the title of which begins with the words,—An Act for allowing further Time for the Payment of Instalments,—and ends with the words,—Relief to Persons connected with and trading to the Islands of Grenada and Saint Vincent.	The whole act.
37 Geo. 3 c. 32	Negotiation of Notes and Bills Act 1797	An Act the title of which begins with the words,—An Act to suspend, for a limited Time, the Operation of Two Acts,—and ends with the words,—Part of Great Britain called England.	The whole act.
37 Geo. 3 c. 33	Mutiny Act 1797	An Act for punishing Mutiny and Desertion; and for the better Payment of the Army and their Quarters.	The whole act.
37 Geo. 3 c. 34	Marine Mutiny Act 1797	An Act for the Regulation of His Majesty's Marine Forces while on Shore.	The whole act.
37 Geo. 3 c. 35	Land Tax (No. 1) Act 1797	An Act for appointing Commissioners for putting in Execution an Act of this Session of Parliament, intituled An Act for granting an Aid to His Majesty by a Land Tax, to be raised in Great Britain, for the Service of the Year One thousand seven hundred and ninety-seven.	The whole act.
37 Geo. 3 c. 37	Trade with United States Act 1797	An Act the title of which begins with the words,—An Act to continue the Laws now in force for regulating the Trade,—and ends with the words,—Countries belonging to the said United States.	The whole act.
37 Geo. 3 c. 38	Militia Pay Act 1797	An Act for defraying the Charge of the Pay and Cloathing of the Militia in that Part of Great Britain called England, for the Year One thousand seven hundred and ninety-seven.	The whole act.
37 Geo. 3 c. 39	Manning of the Army and Navy Act 1797	An Act to explain and amend an Act, made in this present Session of Parliament, intituled An Act for raising a certain Number of Men in the several Counties, Stewartries, Royal Burghs, and Towns, in that Part of Great Britain called Scotland, for the Service of His Majesty's Army and Navy.	The whole act.
37 Geo. 3 c. 40	Banks (Scotland) Act 1797	An Act the title of which begins with the words,—An Act to allow the Banks,—and ends with the words,—Notes for small Sums of Money in that Part of the United Kingdom.	The whole act.
37 Geo. 3 c. 41	Quartering of Soldiers Act 1797	An Act for increasing the Rates of Subsistence to be paid to Innkeepers and others on Quartering Soldiers.	The whole act.
37 Geo. 3 c. 45	Restriction on Cash Payments Act 1797	An Act for confirming and continuing, for a limited Time, the Restriction contained in the Minute of Council of the Twenty-sixth of February One thousand seven hundred and ninety-seven, on Payments of Cash by the Bank.	The whole act.
37 Geo. 3 c. 60	Stamps Act 1797	An Act to amend an Act, made in the Thirty-fourth Year of the Reign of His present Majesty, intituled An Act for granting to His Majesty certain Stamp Duties on Indentures of Clerkships to Solicitors and Attornies in any of the Courts in England therein mentioned.	The whole act.
37 Geo. 3 c. 61	Negotiation of Notes and Bills (No. 2) Act 1797	An Act the title of which begins with the words,—An Act to revive, amend, and continue, for a limited Time, an Act, passed in the present Session,—and ends with the words,—Part of Great Britain called England.	The whole act.
37 Geo. 3 c. 62	Banks (Scotland) (No. 2) Act 1797	An Act the title of which begins with the words,—An Act to revive and continue, for a limited Time, and amend an Act, passed in the present Session,—and ends with the words,—Part of the United Kingdom.	The whole act.
37 Geo. 3 c. 64	Indemnity to Governors of West Indies Act 1797	An Act for indemnifying Governors, Lieutenant Governors, and Persons, acting as such, in the West India Islands, who have permitted the Importation and Exportation of Goods and Commodities in Foreign Bottoms.	The whole act.
37 Geo. 3 c. 70	Incitement to Mutiny Act 1797	An Act for the better Prevention and Punishment of Attempts to seduce Persons serving in His Majesty's Forces, by Sea or Land, from their Duty and Allegiance to His Majesty, or to incite them to Mutiny or Disobedience.	The last Section.
37 Geo. 3 c. 71	Certain Mutinous Crews Act 1797	An Act for more effectually restraining Intercourse with the Crews of certain of His Majesty's Ships now in a State of Mutiny and Rebellion, and for the more effectual Suppression of such Mutiny and Rebellion.	The whole act.
37 Geo. 3 c. 72	Importation Act 1797	An Act for prohibiting the Importation of Cambricks and French Lawns into this Kingdom, not being of the Manufacture of Ireland, except for the Purpose of being warehoused for Exportation.	The whole act.
37 Geo. 3 c. 74	East India Company (No. 2) Act 1797	An Act the title of which begins with the words,—An Act to enable the East India Company to raise, for the Expences of Two Regiments,—and ends with the words,—general Defence of the Kingdom, during the present War.	The whole act.
37 Geo. 3 c. 75	Tower Hamlets Militia Act 1797	An Act to enable His Majesty to draw out and embody the Militia Forces of the Tower Hamlets, in the County of Middlesex.	The whole act.
37 Geo. 3 c. 76	Bounty on Exportation Act 1797	An Act for disallowing the Bounty on the Exportation to Ireland of Sail Cloth or Canvas of the Manufacture of Great Britain for a limited Time.	The whole act.
37 Geo. 3 c. 82	Subscriptions to Loan Act 1797	An Act for allowing certain Discounts to the Contributors of Eighteen Millions, raised by Annuities by an Act of the present Session of Parliament who shall have completed their Contributions on or before the Days therein mentioned.	The whole act.
37 Geo. 3 c. 83	Exportation and Importation Act 1797	An Act to repeal so much of an Act, passed in the present Session of Parliament, as prohibits the Exportation and permits the Importation, Duty free, of several Sorts of Corn, and other Articles made thereof.	The whole act.
37 Geo. 3 c. 84	Importation (No. 2) Act 1797	An Act to permit Goods, the Product or Manufacture of certain Places within the Levant or Mediterranean Seas, to be imported into Great Britain, in British or Foreign Vessels, from any Place whatsoever for a limited Time.	The whole act.
37 Geo. 3 c. 85	Relief of Prisoners Act 1797	An Act the title of which begins with the words,—An Act to amend so much of an Act, made in the Thirty-second Year,—and ends with the words,—to be paid to Prisoners in Execution for Debt, in the Cases therein mentioned.	The whole act.
37 Geo. 3 c. 92	Aliens Act 1797	An Act to continue, until the First Day of May One thousand seven hundred and ninety-eight, an Act, made in the Thirty-third Year of His present Majesty's Reign, intituled An Act for establishing Regulations respecting Aliens arriving in this Kingdom, or resident therein, in certain Cases.	The whole act.
37 Geo. 3 c. 93	Indemnity Act 1797	An Act to indemnify such Persons as have omitted to obtain their Certificates of Enrolment, Admission, or Registry, in the several Courts of this Kingdom.	The whole act.
37 Geo. 3 c. 95	Hampshire and Wiltshire Fisheries Act 1797	An Act to amend Two Acts, made in the Fourth Year of the Reign of Queen Anne, and the First Year of the Reign of King George the First, for the Preservation of Salmon and other Fish in the Rivers within the Counties of Southampton and Wilts.	The whole act.
37 Geo. 3 c. 97	Treaty with United States Act 1797	An Act for carrying into Execution the Treaty of Amity, Commerce, and Navigation, concluded between His Majesty and the United States of America.	The whole act.
37 Geo. 3 c. 99	Continuance of Laws Act 1797	An Act the title of which begins with the words,—An Act to revive and continue the Bounties granted by an Act, made in the Twenty-sixth Year,—and ends with the words,—Duties on Glass, as was to continue for a limited Time.	The whole act.
37 Geo. 3 c. 103	Militia Act 1797	An Act to raise and embody a Militia Force in that Part of the Kingdom called Scotland.	The whole act.
37 Geo. 3 c. 104	Slave Trade Act 1797	An Act for regulating the shipping and carrying of Slaves in British Vessels from the Coast of Africa.	The whole act.
37 Geo. 3 c. 112	Relief of Insolvent Debtors Act 1797	An Act for the Relief of certain Insolvent Debtors.	The whole act.
37 Geo. 3 c. 113	Lottery Act 1797	An Act for granting to His Majesty a certain Sum of Money, to be raised by a Lottery.	The whole act.
37 Geo. 3 c. 114	Loans or Exchequer Bills Act 1797	An Act for raising a certain Sum of Money, by Loans or Exchequer Bills, for the Service of the Year One thousand seven hundred and ninety-seven.	The whole act.
37 Geo. 3 c. 116	Militia Allowances Act 1797	An Act for making Allowances in certain Cases to Subaltern Officers of the Militia in Time of Peace.	The whole act.
37 Geo. 3 c. 119	Negroes Act 1797	An Act to repeal so much of an Act, made in the Fifth Year of the Reign of His late Majesty King George the Second, intituled An Act for the more easy Recovery of Debts in His Majesty's Plantations and Colonies in America, as makes Negroes Chattels for the Payment of Debts.	The whole act.
37 Geo. 3 c. 120	Negotiations of Bills and Notes Act 1797	An Act the title of which begins with the words,—An Act further to continue an Act, made in this present Session,—and ends with the words,—and also for continuing such subsequent Act.	The whole act.
37 Geo. 3 c. 125	Exportation Act 1797	An Act the title of which begins with the words,—An Act for authorizing His Majesty to permit the Exportation of an additional Quantity of Wheat,—and ends with the words,—said Islands, for a limited Time.	The whole act.
37 Geo. 3 c. 127	Meeting of Parliament Act 1797	An Act the title of which begins with the words,—An Act to reform the Mode of levying the Expence of the Royal Invitation,—and ends with the words,—in the Case of a Demise of the Crown.	Section Two.
37 Geo. 3 c. 128	Land Tax (No. 2) Act 1797	An Act for assessing to the Land Tax the Commissioners of the Tax and their Clerks, as to the Land Tax, in the District called Offices executed in Westminster Hall; notwithstanding the Removal of the said Tax Office into Somerset Place.	The whole act.
37 Geo. 3 c. 137	Bank (Scotland) (No. 2) Act 1797	An Act the title of which begins with the words,—An Act to continue an Act, made in the present Session,—and ends with the words,—Part of the United Kingdom for a limited Time.	The whole act.
37 Geo. 3 c. 138	Parliamentary Elections (Scotland) Act 1797	An Act the title of which begins with the words,—An Act to amend an Act, made in this Twenty-second Year,—and ends with the words,—Oath of Trust and Possession to Persons offering to vote for Essex and Colch.	The whole act.
37 Geo. 3 c. 139	Provisional Cavalry Act 1797	An Act the title of which begins with the words,—An Act for allowing a further Time for carrying into Execution certain Powers,—and ends with the words,—wherein the said Acts have not been carried into Execution.	The whole act.
37 Geo. 3 c. 140	Naval Courts-martial Act 1797	An Act to enable His Majesty more easily and effectually to grant conditional Pardons to Persons under Sentence by Naval Courts Martial, and to regulate Imprisonment under such Sentences.	The whole act.
37 Geo. 3 c. 143	Weights and Measures Act 1797	An Act to explain and amend an Act, made in the Thirty-fifth Year of the Reign of His present Majesty, intituled An Act for the more effectual Prevention of the Use of defective Weights, and of false and unequal Balances.	Section One from "That from" to "repealed; and,"
37 Geo. 3 c. 144	Appropriation Act 1797	An Act the title of which begins with the words,—An Act for granting to His Majesty a certain Sum of Money out of the Consolidated Fund,—and ends with the words,—Orders, lost, burnt, or otherwise destroyed.	The whole act.
38 Geo. 3 c. 2	Issue of Bank Notes (Scotland) Act 1797	An Act the title of which begins with the words,—An Act to continue, until the Expiration of Thirty Days,—and ends with the words,—Notes for small Sums of Money in that Part of the United Kingdom, for a limited Time.	The whole act.
38 Geo. 3 c. 3	Importation (No. 3) Act 1797	An Act the title of which begins with the words,—An Act to continue, until the First Day of March One thousand seven hundred and ninety-nine,—and ends with the words,—except for the Purpose of being warehoused for Exportation.	The whole act.
38 Geo. 3 c. 4	Duties on Malt, etc. Act 1797	An Act for continuing and granting to His Majesty certain Duties upon Malt, Mum, Cyder, and Perry, for the Service of the Year One thousand seven hundred and ninety-eight.	The whole act.
38 Geo. 3 c. 5	Land Tax Act 1797	An Act for granting an Aid to His Majesty by a Land Tax, to be raised in Great Britain, for the Service of the Year One thousand seven hundred and ninety-eight.	Section Three from "all and every Person and Persons, Bodies Politic" to "in manner herein-after mentioned; and that," Section Four from "for or upon" to "Estates, and," Section Six, Section Forty-nine so far as it relates to the Oaths appointed by the Acts 1 Geo. 1. Stat. 2. c. 13. and 9 Geo. 3. c. 53., Sections Fifty-five, Fifty-six, Fifty-nine to Sixty-one, Sixty-six to Sixty-eight, Eighty-eight, Ninety-nine, One hundred and twenty, Section One hundred and twenty-four from "and also" to end of that Section, Section One hundred and twenty-five, so much of Section One hundred and twenty-six as relates to duties on offices or employments of profit, and the rest of the Act so far as it relates to duties, goods, wares, merchandise, chattels or other personal estate.
38 Geo. 3 c. 6	Army and Navy Act 1797	An Act the title of which begins with the words,—An Act to continue, until the Expiration of Six Weeks,—and ends with the words,—Allegiance to His Majesty, or to incite them to Mutiny or Disobedience.	The whole act.
38 Geo. 3 c. 7	Negotiation of Notes and Bills (No. 2) Act 1797	An Act the title of which begins with the words,—An Act to continue, until the Expiration of Six Weeks,—and ends with the words,—Bills of Exchange, under a limited Sum, within that Part of Great Britain called England.	The whole act.
38 Geo. 3 c. 8	Loans or Exchequer Bills (No. 2) Act 1797	An Act for raising a certain Sum of Money, by Loans or Exchequer Bills, for the Service of the Year One thousand seven hundred and ninety-eight.	The whole act.
38 Geo. 3 c. 9	Continuance of Laws (No. 2) Act 1797	An Act the title of which begins with the words,—An Act to continue, until the Expiration of Six Weeks,—and ends with the words,—Regulations respecting the Trade and Commerce to and from the Cape of Good Hope.	The whole act.
38 Geo. 3 c. 10	Exportation (No. 2) Act 1797	An Act the title of which begins with the words,—An Act to continue, until the Expiration of Six Weeks,—and ends with the words,—Importation of several Articles of Provision.	The whole act.
38 Geo. 3 c. 11	Duties on Distilleries Act 1797	An Act the title of which begins with the words,—An Act to revive and continue, until the First Day of March One thousand seven hundred and ninety-eight,—and ends with the words,—Duties on Distilleries in the respective Districts in Scotland.	The whole act.
38 Geo. 3 c. 12	Militia (No. 2) Act 1797	An Act to give further Time for executing, and for enlarging the Powers of an Act, made in the last Session of Parliament, intituled An Act to raise and embody a Militia Force in that Part of Great Britain called Scotland.	The whole act.
38 Geo. 3 c. 15	Marine Mutiny (No. 2) Act 1797	An Act for the Regulation of His Majesty's Marine Forces while on Shore, to continue until the Twenty-fifth Day of March One thousand seven hundred and ninety-nine.	The whole act.
38 Geo. 3 c. 17	Militia Act 1798	An Act the title of which begins with the words,—An Act for allowing, during the Continuance of the present War,—and ends with the words,—Six Months after the Conclusion of a general Peace.	The whole act.
38 Geo. 3 c. 19	Supplementary Militia (No. 2) Act 1798	An Act the title of which begins with the words,—An Act to give further Time for putting in Execution an Act,—and ends with the words,—incorporating the Supplementary Militia therewith.	The whole act.
38 Geo. 3 c. 20	Loans or Exchequer Bills Act 1798	An Act for raising a further Sum of Money, by Loans or Exchequer Bills, for the Service of the Year One thousand seven hundred and ninety-eight.	The whole act.
38 Geo. 3 c. 21	Annuity to Lord Saint Vincent Act 1798	An Act for settling and securing a certain Annuity on John Earl Saint Vincent, and the Two next Persons to whom the Title of Earl Saint Vincent shall descend, in Consideration of the eminent Service performed by the said John Earl Saint Vincent to His Majesty and the Publick.	Sections Two to Four.
38 Geo. 3 c. 22	Annuity to Lord Camperdown Act 1798	An Act for settling and securing a certain Annuity on Adam Lord Viscount Duncan, and the Two next Persons to whom the Title of Lord Viscount Duncan shall descend, in Consideration of the eminent Service performed by the said Adam Lord Viscount Duncan to His Majesty and the Publick.	The whole act.
38 Geo. 3 c. 23	Mutiny Act 1798	An Act for punishing Mutiny and Desertion; and for the better Payment of the Army and their Quarters.	The whole act.
38 Geo. 3 c. 24	Duties on Plate Act 1798	An Act to repeal the Duties on Gold and Silver Plate used in Watch Cases.	The whole act.
38 Geo. 3 c. 25	Importation Act 1798	An Act to permit, during the Continuance of the present War, the Importation of Salt from Portugal, to certain Parts of His Majesty's Dominions.	The whole act.
38 Geo. 3 c. 26	Land Tax Act 1798	An Act the title of which begins with the words,—An Act for rectifying Mistakes in the Names of several of the Commissioners,—and ends with the words,—Service of the Year One thousand seven hundred and ninety-seven.	The whole act.
38 Geo. 3 c. 27	Defence of the Realm Act 1798	An Act to enable His Majesty more effectually to provide for the Defence and Security of the Realm during the present War; and for indemnifying Persons who may suffer in their Property by such Measures as may be necessary for that Purpose.	The whole act.
38 Geo. 3 c. 28	Debts Due to the United Provinces, etc. Act 1798	An Act the title of which begins with the words,—An Act to prevent during the War, Persons,—and ends with the words,—Persons, Territories, and Places under their Government.	The whole act.
38 Geo. 3 c. 29	Exportation Act 1798	An Act the title of which begins with the words,—An Act to revive and continue, until the Conclusion of the present War,—and ends with the words,—Wheat and other Articles to the Islands of Guernsey, Jersey, and Alderney.	The whole act.
38 Geo. 3 c. 30	Bounty on British Sail Cloth Exported Act 1798	An Act the title of which begins with the words,—An Act to continue until the Twenty-fifth Day of March One thousand seven hundred and ninety-nine,—and ends with the words,—Sail Cloth or Canvas, the Manufacture of Great Britain, exported to Ireland.	The whole act.
38 Geo. 3 c. 31	Duties on Distilleries Act 1798	An Act the title of which begins with the words,—An Act to revive and continue, until the First Day of May One thousand seven hundred and ninety-eight,—and ends with the words,—Duties on Distilleries, in the respective Districts in Scotland.	The whole act.
38 Geo. 3 c. 32	Quartering of Soldiers Act 1798	An Act for encreasing the Rates of Subsistence to be paid to Innkeepers and others on quartering Soldiers.	The whole act.
38 Geo. 3 c. 35	Continuance of Laws Act 1798	An Act the title of which begins with the words,—An Act to continue several Laws relating to the granting a Bounty on certain Species of British and Irish Linens exported,—and ends with the words,—Duties on Glass, as was to continue in force until the Twenty-ninth Day of September One thousand seven hundred and ninety-nine.	The whole act.
38 Geo. 3 c. 36	Habeas Corpus Suspension Act 1798	An Act to empower His Majesty to secure and detain such Persons as His Majesty shall suspect are conspiring against His Person and Government.	The whole act.
38 Geo. 3 c. 40	Inhabited House, etc., Duties Act 1798	An Act for repealing the Duties on Houses, Windows, and Lights, on inhabited Houses, and on Clocks and Watches; and for granting to His Majesty other Duties on Houses, Windows, and Lights, and on inhabited Houses, in lieu thereof.	The whole act.
38 Geo. 3 c. 44	Militia (No. 2) Act 1798	An Act to provide for the Defense of that Part of Great Britain called Scotland, and to amend an Act made in the last Session of Parliament, intituled An Act to raise and embody a Militia Force in that Part of the Kingdom of Great Britain called Scotland.	The whole act.
38 Geo. 3 c. 46	Manning of the Navy Act 1798	An Act for the more speedy and effectual Manning of His Majesty's Navy.	The whole act.
38 Geo. 3 c. 51	Yeomanry Cavalry Act 1798	An Act for authorizing the billeting such Troops of Yeomanry Cavalry as may be desirous of assembling for the Purpose of being trained together, and for exempting from the Hair Powder Duty such Persons providing Horses for the said Yeomanry Cavalry.	The whole act.
38 Geo. 3 c. 59	Silver Coin Act 1798	An Act the title of which begins with the words,—An Act to revive and continue, until the First Day of January One thousand seven hundred and ninety-nine,—and ends with the words,—and to suspend the Coining of Silver.	The whole act.
38 Geo. 3 c. 61	Drawbacks, etc. Act 1798	An Act the title of which begins with the words,—An Act to continue until the End of the next Session of Parliament, and amend an Act,—and ends with the words,—Bounty on the Exportation of Sugar.	The whole act.
38 Geo. 3 c. 63	Isle of Man Trade Act 1798	An Act for the further Encouragement of the Trade and Manufactures of the Isle of Man; for improving the Revenue thereof; and for the more effectual Prevention of Smuggling to and from the said Island.	The whole act.
38 Geo. 3 c. 64	Militia Pay Act 1798	An Act for defraying the Charge of the Pay and Cloathing of the Militia in that Part of Great Britain called England, for One Year, from the Twenty-fifth Day of March One thousand seven hundred and ninety-eight.	The whole act.
38 Geo. 3 c. 66	Militia (No. 4) Act 1798	An Act for empowering His Majesty, for a Time and to an Extent to be limited, to accept the Services of such Parts of His Militia Forces in this Kingdom as may voluntarily offer themselves to be employed in Ireland.	The whole act.
38 Geo. 3 c. 68	Duties on Cinnamon, etc. Act 1798	An Act for regulating the Payment, until Two Months after the Commencement of the next Session of Parliament after the End of the present War, of the Duties on Cinnamon, Cloves, Nutmegs, and Mace, and for granting to His Majesty additional Duties thereon.	The whole act.
38 Geo. 3 c. 70	Militia Allowances Act 1798	An Act for making Allowances in certain Cases to Subaltern Officers of the Militia in Time of Peace.	The whole act.
38 Geo. 3 c. 72	Indemnity to Governors of West Indies Act 1798	An Act for indemnifying Governors, Lieutenant Governors, and Persons acting as such, in the West India Islands, who have permitted the Importation and Exportation of Goods and Commodities in Foreign Bottoms.	The whole act.
38 Geo. 3 c. 75	Lottery Act 1798	An Act for granting to His Majesty a certain Sum of Money, to be raised by a Lottery.	The whole act.
38 Geo. 3 c. 76	Customs, etc. Act 1798	An Act the title of which begins with the words,—An Act for the better Protection of the Trade of this Kingdom,—and ends with the words,—signing the Preliminary Articles of Peace.	The whole act.
38 Geo. 3 c. 77	Aliens (No. 2) Act 1798	An Act the title of which begins with the words,—An Act to amend an Act of the present Session,—and ends with the words,—Aliens arriving in this Kingdom, or resident therein, in certain Cases.	The whole act.
38 Geo. 3 c. 79	Residence in France During the War Act 1798	An Act the title of which begins with the words,—An Act more effectually to prevent, during the War, Persons,—and ends with the words,—Correspondence with such Persons, and with His Majesty's Enemies.	The whole act.
38 Geo. 3 c. 82	Loans or Exchequer Bills (No. 2) Act 1798	An Act for raising an Additional Sum of Money, by Loans or Exchequer Bills, for the Service of the Year One thousand seven hundred and ninety-eight.	The whole act.
38 Geo. 3 c. 83	Loans or Exchequer Bills (No. 3) Act 1798	An Act to authorize Exchequer Bills to be issued on the Credit of the Loan granted by an Act, made in this present Session of Parliament, intituled An Act for raising the Sum of Seventeen Millions by way of Annuities.	The whole act.
38 Geo. 3 c. 84	Loans or Exchequer Bills (No. 4) Act 1798	An Act the title of which begins with the words,—An Act to enable the Lords Commissioners of His Majesty's Treasury to issue Exchequer Bills,—and ends with the words,—and on the Tonnage of Ships entering Outwards or Inwards.	The whole act.
38 Geo. 3 c. 88	Slave Trade Act 1798	An Act for regulating, until the First Day of August One thousand seven hundred and ninety-nine, the shipping and carrying of Slaves in British Vessels from the Coast of Africa.	The whole act.
38 Geo. 3 c. 90	Appropriation Act 1798	An Act the title of which begins with the words,—An Act for enabling His Majesty to raise the Sum of One Million,—and ends with the words,—Orders, lost, burnt, or otherwise destroyed.	The whole act.
38 Geo. 3 c. 91	Exchequer Bills Act 1798	An Act for raising the Sum of Three Millions, by Loans or Exchequer Bills.	The whole act.
38 Geo. 3 c. 94	Provisional Cavalry Act 1798	An Act for the Regulation of the Provisional Force of Cavalry, raised by virtue of Two Acts of the last Session of Parliament.	The whole act.
39 Geo. 3 c. 1	Annuity to Lord Nelson, etc. Act 1798	An Act the title of which begins with the words,—An Act for settling and securing a certain Annuity,—and ends with the words,—Lord Nelson, to His Majesty and the Publick.	The whole act.
39 Geo. 3 c. 2	Duties upon Malt, etc. Act 1798	An Act for continuing and granting to His Majesty certain Duties upon Malt, Mum, Cyder, and Perry, for the Service of the Year One thousand seven hundred and ninety-nine.	The whole act.
39 Geo. 3 c. 3	Duties on Pensions, etc. Act 1798	An Act for continuing and granting to His Majesty a Duty on Pensions, Offices, and Personal Estates, in England, Wales, and the Town of Berwick upon Tweed; and certain Duties on Sugar, Malt, Tobacco, and Snuff, for the Service of the Year One thousand seven hundred and ninety-nine.	The whole act.
39 Geo. 3 c. 4	Army and Navy Act 1798	An Act the title of which begins with the words,—An Act further to continue, until the Expiration of Six Weeks,—and ends with the words,—or to incite them to Mutiny or Disobedience.	The whole act.
39 Geo. 3 c. 5	Militia (No. 5) Act 1798	An Act the title of which begins with the words,—An Act to continue, until the Expiration of One Month,—and ends with the words,—voluntarily offer themselves to be employed in Ireland.	The whole act.
39 Geo. 3 c. 8	Armorial Bearings Act 1799	An Act for extending the Time allowed for taking out Certificates for using or wearing Armorial Bearings or Ensigns, until the Fifteenth Day of February One thousand seven hundred and ninety-nine.	The whole act.
39 Geo. 3 c. 9	Negotiations of Notes and Bills Act 1799	An Act the title of which begins with the words,—An Act to continue, until the First Day of February One thousand seven hundred and ninety-nine,—and ends with the words,—Twenty-fifth Day of March One thousand seven hundred and ninety-nine.	The whole act.
39 Geo. 3 c. 10	Issue of Bank Notes (Scotland) Act 1799	An Act the title of which begins with the words,—An Act to continue, until the Twenty-fifth Day of March One thousand seven hundred and ninety-nine,—and ends with the words,—Notes for small Sums of Money in that Part of the United Kingdom, for a limited Time.	The whole act.
39 Geo. 3 c. 11	Grenada and Saint Vincent Traders Act 1799	An Act for allowing further Time for the Payment of Instalments to become due on certain Sums advanced by way of Loan, to certain Persons connected with and trading to the Islands of Grenada and Saint Vincent.	The whole act.
39 Geo. 3 c. 12	Continuance of Laws Act 1799	An Act the title of which begins with the words,—An Act to continue, until the Expiration of Six Weeks,—and ends with the words,—Regulations respecting the Trade and Commerce to and from the Cape of Good Hope.	The whole act.
39 Geo. 3 c. 14	Supplementary Militia Act 1799	An Act for exempting, during the present War, certain Persons, serving in Volunteer Corps, from being ballotted for the Supplementary Militia, under certain conditions; and for making out new Lists of Men liable to serve in the said Militia.	The whole act.
39 Geo. 3 c. 15	Habeas Corpus Suspension Act 1799	An Act the title of which begins with the words,—An Act to continue, until the Twenty-first day of May One thousand seven hundred and ninety-nine,—and ends with the words,—conspiring against His Person and Government.	The whole act.
39 Geo. 3 c. 16	Courts (Newfoundland) Act 1799	An Act the title of which begins with the words,—An Act to revive and continue, until Thirty Days,—and ends with the words,—Judicature in the Island of Newfoundland, and the Islands adjacent.	The whole act.
39 Geo. 3 c. 18	Loans or Exchequer Bills Act 1799	An Act for raising a certain Sum of Money, by Loans or Exchequer Bills, for the Service of the Year One thousand seven hundred and ninety-nine.	The whole act.
39 Geo. 3 c. 19	Marine Mutiny Act 1799	An Act for the Regulation of His Majesty's Marine Forces while on Shore, until the Twenty-fifth Day of March One thousand eight hundred.	The whole act.
39 Geo. 3 c. 20	Mutiny Act 1799	An Act for punishing Mutiny and Desertion; and for the better Payment of the Army and their Quarters.	The whole act.
39 Geo. 3 c. 23	Provisional Cavalry Act 1799	An Act the title of which begins with the words,—An Act to repeal certain Parts of Three Acts,—and ends with the words,—Provisional Cavalry of this Kingdom as is now actually called out and embodied.	The whole act.
39 Geo. 3 c. 24	Negotiations of Notes and Bills (No. 2) Act 1799	An Act the title of which begins with the words,—An Act to continue, until the Twenty-fifth Day of May next,—and ends with the words,—that Part of Great Britain called England.	The whole act.
39 Geo. 3 c. 25	Issue of Bank Notes (Scotland) (No. 2) Act 1799	An Act the title of which begins with the words,—An Act to continue, until the Twenty-fifth Day of May next,—and ends with the words,—Notes for Sums under a certain Amount.	The whole act.
39 Geo. 3 c. 26	Exportation Act 1799	An Act the title of which begins with the words,—An Act to continue, until the Twenty-fifth Day of March One thousand eight hundred,—and ends with the words,—Sail Cloth or Canvas of the Manufacture of Great Britain.	The whole act.
39 Geo. 3 c. 27	Importation Act 1799	An Act the title of which begins with the words,—An Act to revive and continue, until the Twenty-fifth Day of March One thousand eight hundred,—and ends with the words,—except for the Purpose of being warehoused for Exportation.	The whole act.
39 Geo. 3 c. 28	Bounty on Certain Linens Exported Act 1799	An Act the title of which begins with the words,—An Act to continue, until the Twenty-fourth Day of June One thousand eight hundred,—and ends with the words,—Importation of Foreign Kid Skins Dressed or Undressed.	The whole act.
39 Geo. 3 c. 29	Annuities Act 1799	An Act for enabling His Majesty to settle an Annuity of Twelve thousand Pounds on His Royal Highness Prince Edward, and a like Annuity of Twelve thousand Pounds on His Royal Highness Prince Ernest Augustus, during His Majesty's Pleasure.	The whole act.
39 Geo. 3 c. 30	Annuities (No. 2) Act 1799	An Act the title of which begins with the words,—An Act to enable His Majesty to settle on Her Royal Highness the Princess Amelia,—and ends with the words,—Act passed in the Eighteenth Year of the Reign of His present Majesty.	The whole act.
39 Geo. 3 c. 31	Duties on Distilleries Act 1799	An Act the title of which begins with the words,—An Act to continue, until the Tenth Day of July,—and ends with the words,—Duty on unmalted Grain used in Distillation in Scotland.	The whole act.
39 Geo. 3 c. 32	Shipping Act 1799	An Act to permit Ships to sail from certain Ports of the Island of Newfoundland, and from the Coast of Labrador, without Convoy.	The whole act.
39 Geo. 3 c. 33	Loans or Exchequer Bills (No. 2) Act 1799	An Act for raising a further Sum of Money, by Loans or Exchequer Bills, for the Service of the Year One thousand seven hundred and ninety-nine.	The whole act.
39 Geo. 3 c. 34	Partridges Act 1799	An Act the title of which begins with the words,—An Act to amend an Act, passed in the Thirty-sixth Year,—and ends with the words,—by making other Provisions for that Purpose.	Sections One and Two.
39 Geo. 3 c. 35	Militia Act 1799	An Act for exempting, during the present War, Persons serving in Volunteer Corps and Associations, from being ballotted for the Militia, under certain Conditions.	The whole act.
39 Geo. 3 c. 36	Quartering of Soldiers Act 1799	An Act for increasing the Rates of Subsistence to be paid to Innkeepers and others on quartering Soldiers.	The whole act.
39 Geo. 3 c. 39	Stamps Act 1799	An Act to amend an Act, made in the Thirty-fourth Year of the Reign of His present Majesty, intituled An Act for granting to His Majesty certain Stamp Duties on Indentures of Clerkships to Solicitors and Attornies, in any of the Courts in England, therein mentioned.	The whole act.
39 Geo. 3 c. 41	Loans or Exchequer Bills (No. 3) Act 1799	An Act for raising an additional Sum of Money, by Loans or Exchequer Bills, for the Service of the Year One thousand seven hundred and ninety-nine.	The whole act.
39 Geo. 3 c. 44	Habeas Corpus Suspension (No. 2) Act 1799	An Act the title of which begins with the words,—An Act for further continuing, until the First Day of March One thousand eight hundred,—and ends with the words,—conspiring against His Person and Government.	The whole act.
39 Geo. 3 c. 46	Lodgings of Justices of Assize Act 1799	An Act the title of which begins with the words,—An Act for making perpetual so much of an Act made in the Nineteenth Year,—and ends with the words,—as relates to the Lodgings of Judges at County Assizes.	The whole act.
39 Geo. 3 c. 47	Negotiation of Notes and Bills Act 1799	An Act the title of which begins with the words,—An Act to continue, until the Fifth Day of July next, an Act, made in the present Session,—and ends with the words,—Bills of Exchange, under a limited Sum, within that Part of Great Britain called England.	The whole act.
39 Geo. 3 c. 48	Issue of Bank Notes (Scotland) (No. 3) Act 1799	An Act the title of which begins with the words,—An Act to continue, until the Fifth Day of July One thousand seven hundred and ninety-nine,—and ends with the words,—Notes for Sums under a certain Amount.	The whole act.
39 Geo. 3 c. 50	Relief of Debtors Act 1799	An Act the title of which begins with the words,—An Act for making perpetual an Act, made in the Thirty-third Year,—and ends with the words,—upon Oath, their Estates for their Creditors' Benefit.	The whole act.
39 Geo. 3 c. 51	Transportation, etc. Act 1799	An Act for continuing, until the Twenty-fifth Day of March One thousand eight hundred and two, several Laws relating to the Transportation of Felons and other Offenders, and to the authorizing the Removal of Offenders, to temporary Places of Confinement in England and Scotland respectively.	The whole act.
39 Geo. 3 c. 52	Penitentiary Houses Act 1799	An Act the title of which begins with the words,—An Act for continuing, until the Twenty-fifth Day of March One thousand eight hundred and two,—and ends with the words,—as relates to Penitentiary Houses.	The whole act.
39 Geo. 3 c. 53	Payment of Creditors (Scotland) Act 1799	An Act the title of which begins with the words,—An Act to continue, until the Twenty-fifth Day of March One thousand eight hundred and four,—and ends with the words,—that Part of Great Britain called Scotland.	The whole act.
39 Geo. 3 c. 54	Tanners' Indemnity, etc. Act 1799	An Act the title of which begins with the words,—An Act to indemnify all Persons,—and ends with the words,—and to repeal Parts of the said Act, relating to the Buying of Hides.	The whole act.
39 Geo. 3 c. 56	Colliers (Scotland) Act 1799	An Act to explain and amend the Laws relative to Colliers in that Part of Great Britain called Scotland.	Except Sections Five and Six.
39 Geo. 3 c. 57	Indemnity to Governors of West Indies Act 1799	An Act for indemnifying Governors, Lieutenant Governors, and Persons acting as such, in the West India Islands, who have permitted the Importation and Exportation of Goods and Commodities in Foreign Bottoms.	The whole act.
39 Geo. 3 c. 58	Annuity to Sir James Marriott Act 1799	An Act to enable His Majesty to grant a certain Annuity to Sir James Marriott, Knight, late Judge of the High Court of Admiralty, in Consideration of his diligent and faithful Services in the Execution of that Office.	The whole act.
39 Geo. 3 c. 61	Customs Act 1799	An Act to repeal the Duty granted by an Act of the last Session of Parliament on Raw Linen Yarn, the Produce of the Territories of the King of Prussia, and imported directly from thence into this Kingdom; and for charging another Duty in lieu thereof.	The whole act.
39 Geo. 3 c. 62	Militia (No. 2) Act 1799	An Act to amend an Act, made in the Thirty-seventh Year of the Reign of His present Majesty, and Two Acts made in the last Session of Parliament, for raising a Militia Force in that Part of the Kingdom of Great Britain called Scotland.	The whole act.
39 Geo. 3 c. 66	Sheriff Deputies, etc. (Scotland) Act 1799	An Act for placing the Salaries of the Sheriff Deputes and Substitutes of Scotland upon the Scots Civil List Establishment.	The whole act.
39 Geo. 3 c. 67	Courts of Exchequer Act 1799	An Act to enable the Person whom His Majesty shall appoint to the vacant Office of a Baron of the Exchequer, to take upon himself the Degree of a Serjeant at Law.	The whole act.
39 Geo. 3 c. 68	Loans or Exchequer Bills (No. 4) Act 1799	An Act for enabling His Majesty to raise the Sum of Three Millions for the Uses and Purposes therein mentioned.	The whole act.
39 Geo. 3 c. 69	Loans of Exchequer Bills (No. 5) Act 1799	An Act for raising the Sum of Three millions five hundred thousand Pounds, by Loans or Exchequer Bills, for the Service of the Year One thousand seven hundred and ninety-nine.	The whole act.
39 Geo. 3 c. 70	Loans or Exchequer Bills (No. 6) Act 1799	An Act for raising the Sum of Three Millions, by Loans or Exchequer Bills, for the Service of the Year One thousand seven hundred and ninety-nine.	The whole act.
39 Geo. 3 c. 71	Loans or Exchequer Bills (No. 7) Act 1799	An Act to enable the Lords Commissioners of His Majesty's Treasury to issue Exchequer Bills to a limited Amount, on the Credit of such Monies as shall arise by virtue of an Act of this Session, for granting certain Duties on Income.	The whole act.
39 Geo. 3 c. 73	Legacy Duty Act 1799	An Act the title of which begins with the words,—An Act for exempting certain specifick Legacies,—and ends with the words,—Bequests of Moveables to the Trustees of the British Museum.	Section Two.
39 Geo. 3 c. 74	Post Horse Duties Act 1799	An Act the title of which begins with the words,—An Act for further continuing until the First Day of February One thousand eight hundred and three,—and ends with the words,—Persons as should be willing to contract for the same.	The whole act.
39 Geo. 3 c. 79	Unlawful Societies Act 1799	An Act for the more effectual Suppression of Societies established for Seditious and Treasonable Purposes; and for better preventing Treasonable and Seditious Practices.	Section Four, Section Eleven from "save" to end of that Section, and Sections Twelve and Thirty-nine.
39 Geo. 3 c. 84	Annuity (Heirs of Sir Thomas Clarges) Act 1799	An Act the title of which begins with the words,—An Act to enable the Lords Commissioners of the Treasury to contract with the Most Noble Charles Duke of Richmond,—and ends with the words,—Payable out of the Consolidated Fund.	Except the last Section.
39 Geo. 3 c. 87	Importation (No. 3) Act 1799	An Act the title of which begins with the words,—An Act for enabling His Majesty to prohibit the Exportation,—and ends with the words,—Six Weeks from the Commencement of the next Session of Parliament.	The whole act.
39 Geo. 3 c. 88	Importation and Exportation Act 1799	An Act for creating the Port of Edinburgh District, for the Purpose of regulating the Importation and Exportation of Corn.	The whole act.
39 Geo. 3 c. 91	Lottery Act 1799	An Act for granting to His Majesty a certain Sum of Money, to be raised by a Lottery.	The whole act.
39 Geo. 3 c. 93	Forfeiture upon Attainder of Treason Act 1799	An Act the title of which begins with the words,—An Act to repeal so much of an Act, passed in the Seventh Year,—and ends with the words,—Treason after the Death of the Pretender and his Sons.	The whole act.
39 Geo. 3 c. 95	Importation (No. 4) Act	An Act the title of which begins with the words,—An Act to permit Goods the Produce of any Foreign Colony in America,—and ends with the words,—Protection of the Trade of this Kingdom.	The whole act.
39 Geo. 3 c. 96	Exportation (No. 2) Act 1799	An Act to enable Matthew Boulton, Engineer, to export the Machinery necessary for erecting a Mint in the Dominions of His Imperial Majesty, the Emperor of all the Russias.	The whole act.
39 Geo. 3 c. 97	Militia Pay Act 1799	An Act for defraying the Charge of the Pay and Cloathing of the Militia in that Part of Great Britain called England, for One Year, from the Twenty-fifth Day of March One thousand seven hundred and ninety-nine.	The whole act.
39 Geo. 3 c. 98	Importation (No. 5) Act 1799	An Act to allow the Importation of Spanish Wool, in Ships belonging to Countries in Amity with His Majesty.	The whole act.
39 Geo. 3 c. 101	Fisheries in Greenland Seas, etc. Act 1799	An Act the title of which begins with the words,—An Act to continue several Laws relating to the further Support and Encouragement of the Fisheries,—and ends with the words,—Twenty-fifth Day of March One thousand eight hundred and six.	The whole act.
39 Geo. 3 c. 102	Newfoundland Fisheries Act 1799	An Act the title of which begins with the words,—An Act to revive and continue, until the First Day of January One thousand eight hundred and one,—and ends	The whole act.
39 Geo. 3 c. 103	Militia Allowances Act 1799	An Act for making Allowances in certain Cases to Subaltern Officers of the Militia in Time of Peace.	The whole act.
39 Geo. 3 c. 105	Manufacture of Maidstone Geneva Act 1799	An Act to continue and amend so much of an Act, made in the Thirty-third Year of the Reign of His present Majesty, as permits Sir William Bishop, Thomas Bishop, and Argles Bishop, to carry on the Manufacture of Maidstone Geneva.	The whole act.
39 Geo. 3 c. 109	Forces of East India Company Act 1799	An Act for better recruiting the Forces of the East India Company.	The whole act.
39 Geo. 3 c. 110	Judges' Pensions Act 1799	An Act the title of which begins with the words,—An Act for the Augmentation of the Salaries of the Judges,—and ends with the words,—Resignation of their respective Offices.	Except Section Seven.
39 Geo. 3 c. 112	Importation (No. 7) Act 1799	An Act to enable His Majesty, by Order in Council, to permit, until Six Weeks after the Commencement of the next Session of Parliament, such Goods as shall be specified in such Order to be imported into this Kingdom, in Neutral Ships.	The whole act.
39 Geo. 3 c. 113	Appointment of Judges in Vacation Act 1799	An Act to enable such Persons as His Majesty may be pleased to appoint to the Office of Chief Justice, or of One of the Justices of either Bench, or of Chief Baron, or One of the Barons of the Exchequer, to take upon themselves the Degree of a Serjeant at Law in Vacation.	The whole act.
39 Geo. 3 c. 114	Appropriation Act 1799	An Act the title of which begins with the words,—An Act for granting to His Majesty a certain Sum of Money out of the Consolidated Fund,—and ends with the words,—Supplies granted in this Session of Parliament.	The whole act.
39 & 40 Geo. 3 c. 2	Duties upon Malt, etc. Act 1799	An Act for continuing and granting to His Majesty certain Duties upon Malt, Mum, Cyder, and Perry, for the Service of the Year One thousand eight hundred.	The whole act.
39 & 40 Geo. 3 c. 3	Duties on Pensions, etc. Act 1799	An Act for continuing and granting to His Majesty a Duty on Pensions, Offices, and Personal Estates in England, Wales, and the Town of Berwick upon Tweed; and certain Duties on Sugar, Malt, Tobacco, and Snuff, for the Service of the Year One thousand eight hundred.	The whole act.
39 & 40 Geo. 3 c. 4	Loans or Exchequer Bills Act 1799	An Act the title of which begins with the words,—An Act for raising a certain Sum of Money,—and ends with the words,—to be received in Payment of any of the Branches of the Publick Revenue.	The whole act.
39 & 40 Geo. 3 c. 5	Loans for Relief of Certain Merchants Act 1799	An Act for enabling His Majesty to direct the Issue of Exchequer Bills to a limited Amount, and in the Manner therein mentioned, for the Relief of the Merchants of Liverpool and Lancaster.	The whole act.
39 & 40 Geo. 3 c. 6	Exchequer Bills Act 1799	An Act the title of which begins with the words,—An Act to enable the Lords Commissioners of His Majesty's Treasury to issue Exchequer Bills,—and ends with the words,—Act of last Session of Parliament for granting certain Duties upon Income.	The whole act.
39 & 40 Geo. 3 c. 7	Distillation from Wheat, etc. Act 1799	An Act to prohibit, until the First Day of March One thousand eight hundred, the making of Low Wines or Spirits from Wheat, Barley, Malt, or other sort of Grain, or from any Meal, Flour, or Bran, in that Part of Great Britain called Scotland.	The whole act.
39 & 40 Geo. 3 c. 8	Duties on Spirits Act 1799	An Act the title of which begins with the words,—An Act for reducing, until the First Day of June One thousand eight hundred,—and ends with the words,—collecting the Duties payable on the Importation of Starch.	The whole act.
39 & 40 Geo. 3 c. 9	Continuance of Laws Act 1799	An Act the title of which begins with the words,—An Act to continue, until the Twentieth Day of February One thousand eight hundred,—and ends with the words,—Importation of other Articles of Provision, without Payment of Duty.	The whole act.
39 & 40 Geo. 3 c. 10	Land Tax Redemption Act 1799	An Act to extend the Period, limited by an Act of the last Session of Parliament, for the Benefit of Preference to certain Bodies, Companies, and Persons, in contracting for the Redemption of Land Tax, until the Twenty-fifth Day of March One thousand eight hundred.	The whole act.
39 & 40 Geo. 3 c. 12	Duties and Drawbacks Act 1799	An Act the title of which begins with the words,—An Act to enable the Commissioners of the Navy, Victualling, and Transport Service,—and ends with the words,—and for allowing, until the Fifth Day of May One thousand eight hundred, certain Bounties on Wheat exported.	The whole act.
39 & 40 Geo. 3 c. 13	Loans to Grenada and Saint Vincent Traders Act 1799	An Act for allowing further Time for the Payment of Instalments on certain Sums of Money advanced by way of Loan to several Persons connected with and trading to the Islands of Grenada and Saint Vincent.	The whole act.
39 & 40 Geo. 3 c. 15	Militia Act 1800	An Act the title of which begins with the words,—An Act for continuing, until the Expiration of Six Weeks,—and ends with the words,—Militia Forces in this Kingdom as may voluntarily offer themselves to be employed in Ireland.	The whole act.
39 & 40 Geo. 3 c. 16	Army and Navy Act 1800	An Act the title of which begins with the words,—An Act for continuing, until the Expiration of Six Weeks,—and ends with the words,—Allegiance to His Majesty, or to incite them to Mutiny or Disobedience.	The whole act.
39 & 40 Geo. 3 c. 17	Continuance of Laws Act 1800	An Act the title of which begins with the words,—An Act to continue, until the First Day of March One thousand eight hundred and three,—and ends with the words,—His Majesty to permit Goods to be imported into this Kingdom in Neutral Ships.	The whole act.
39 & 40 Geo. 3 c. 18	Sale of Bread Act 1800	An Act to prohibit, until the Expiration of Six Weeks after the Commencement of the next Session of Parliament, any Person or Persons from selling any Bread which shall not have been baked a certain Time.	The whole act.
39 & 40 Geo. 3 c. 20	Habeas Corpus Suspension Act 1800	An Act the title of which begins with the words,—An Act for further continuing, until the First Day of February One thousand eight hundred and one,—and ends with the words,—conspiring against His Person and Government.	The whole act.
39 & 40 Geo. 3 c. 21	Distillation From Wheat, etc. Act 1800	An Act the title of which begins with the words,—An Act to continue, until the First Day of February One thousand eight hundred and one,—and ends with the words,—Bank, in that Part of Great Britain called Scotland.	The whole act.
39 & 40 Geo. 3 c. 24	Marine Mutiny Act 1800	An Act for the Regulation of His Majesty's Marine Forces while on Shore.	The whole act.
39 & 40 Geo. 3 c. 25	Use of Wheat in Making Starch Act 1800	An Act to prohibit, until the First Day of October One thousand eight hundred, the Use of Wheat in making Starch.	The whole act.
39 & 40 Geo. 3 c. 27	Mutiny Act 1800	An Act for punishing Mutiny and Desertion; and for the better Payment of the Army and their Quarters.	The whole act.
39 & 40 Geo. 3 c. 28	Bank of England Act 1800	An Act for establishing an Agreement with the Governor and Company of the Bank of England, for advancing the Sum of Three Millions towards the Supply for the Service of the Year One thousand eight hundred.	Except from "the said Governor and Company of the Bank of England, and their successors, for ever," in Section Thirteen to end of Act.
39 & 40 Geo. 3 c. 29	Bounties on Importation Act 1800	An Act for granting Bounties on the Importation of Wheat, Wheaten Flour, and Rice, until the First Day of October One thousand eight hundred.	The whole act.
39 & 40 Geo. 3 c. 31	Duty on Pensions, etc. Act 1800	An Act the title of which begins with the words,—An Act for appointing Commissioners to put in Execution an Act of this Session,—and ends with the words,—Two former Acts for appointing Commissioners of the Land Tax.	The whole act.
39 & 40 Geo. 3 c. 33	Exchequer Bills (No. 1) Act 1800	An Act the title of which begins with the words,—An Act to enable the Lords Commissioners of His Majesty's Treasury to issue Exchequer Bills,—and ends with the words,—Bullion, to be remitted Abroad on Account of Foreign Subsidies or Services Abroad.	The whole act.
39 & 40 Geo. 3 c. 34	Neutral Ships Act 1800	An Act to permit the Importation of Goods and Commodities from Countries in America, belonging to any Foreign European Sovereign or State, in neutral Ships, until the Twenty-ninth Day of September One thousand eight hundred and one.	The whole act.
39 & 40 Geo. 3 c. 35	Bounty on Importation Act 1800	An Act for granting a Bounty on the Importation of Oats, until the First Day of October One thousand eight hundred.	The whole act.
39 & 40 Geo. 3 c. 36	Transfer of Stock Act 1800	An Act the title of which begins with the words,—An Act to amend an Act to enable Courts of Equity to compel a Transfer of Stock in Suits,—and ends with the words,—Merchants of Great Britain trading to the South Seas or other Parts of America, Party thereto.	Section Three and Section Four so far as it relates to the South Sea Company.
39 & 40 Geo. 3 c. 37	Militia Pay Act 1800	An Act for defraying the Charge of the Pay and Cloathing of the Militia in that Part of Great Britain called England, for One Year, from the Twenty-fifth Day of March One thousand eight hundred.	The whole act.
39 & 40 Geo. 3 c. 38	Saltpetre Act 1800	An Act for repealing so much of an Act, made in the last Session of Parliament, intituled An Act for permitting certain Goods imported from the East Indies to be warehoused; and for repealing the Duties now payable thereon, and granting other Duties in lieu thereof, as relates to Saltpetre.	The whole act.
39 & 40 Geo. 3 c. 39	Quartering of Soldiers Act 1800	An Act for increasing the Rates of Subsistence to be paid to Innkeepers and others on quartering Soldiers.	The whole act.
39 & 40 Geo. 3 c. 40	Poor Act 1800	An Act the title of which begins with the words,—An Act to enlarge the Powers of the Directors and Guardians of the Poor,—and ends with the words,—First Day of January One thousand eight hundred and two.	The whole act.
39 & 40 Geo. 3 c. 48	Duties on Sugar, etc. Act 1800	An Act the title of which begins with the words,—An Act for granting additional Drawbacks on Sugar and Coffee exported,—and ends with the words,—Drawbacks on Sugar exported, until the Tenth Day of May One thousand eight hundred and one.	The whole act.
39 & 40 Geo. 3 c. 52	Lottery Act 1800	An Act for granting to His Majesty a certain Sum of Money, to be raised by a Lottery.	The whole act.
39 & 40 Geo. 3 c. 53	Bounty on Rye Act 1800	An Act for granting a Bounty on the Importation of Rye, until the Fifteenth Day of October One thousand eight hundred.	The whole act.
39 & 40 Geo. 3 c. 54	Public Accountants Act 1800	An Act for more effectually charging Publick Accountants with the Payment of Interest; for allowing Interest to them in certain Cases; and for compelling the Payment of Balances due from them.	Section Seven.
39 & 40 Geo. 3 c. 57	Harbour of Leith Act 1800	An Act the title of which begins with the words,—An Act for enabling the Barons of the Court of Exchequer in Scotland,—and ends with the words,—Proprietors of the Forth and Clyde Navigation.	The whole act.
39 & 40 Geo. 3 c. 58	Importation and Exportation Act 1800	An Act for further continuing and amending an Act, made in the last Session of Parliament, for enabling His Majesty to prohibit the Exportation and permit the Importation of Corn; and for allowing the Importation of other Articles of Provision without Payment of Duty.	The whole act.
39 & 40 Geo. 3 c. 61	Duties on Wash Made from Sugar Act 1800	An Act to revive and continue, until the First Day of July One thousand eight hundred and one, such Part of an Act, made in the Twenty-sixth Year of Parliament, for reducing the Duties upon Spirits distilled from Molasses or Sugar, or any Mixture therewith, and for other Purposes, as relates to the Duties on Wort or Wash brewed or made from Molasses or Sugar.	The whole act.
39 & 40 Geo. 3 c. 62	Use of Sugar in Brewing Act 1800	An Act to allow, for Nine Months after the passing of the Act, the Use of Sugar in the brewing of Beer.	The whole act.
39 & 40 Geo. 3 c. 63	Duties on Kid Skins Act 1800	An Act for repealing Part of the Duties and Drawbacks of Customs on Kid Skins imported, and the Exemption of imported Kid Skins from Excise Duty on being dressed in Great Britain.	The whole act.
39 & 40 Geo. 3 c. 64	Neutral Ships (No. 2) Act 1800	An Act for permitting the free Importation of Linseed Cakes and Rape Cakes in Neutral Ships.	The whole act.
39 & 40 Geo. 3 c. 67	Union with Ireland Act 1800	An Act for the Union of Great Britain and Ireland.	Section One so far as it relates to the parts of Articles following; namely, — Article Fourth,—The tenth paragraph. Article Sixth,—The third paragraph from "and that, for the Period" to end of that paragraph, the fourth and last paragraphs, and the Schedules to Article Sixth, and so much of the rest of that Article as relates to such Schedules.
39 & 40 Geo. 3 c. 68	Land Tax Act 1800	An Act the title of which begins with the words,—An Act for extending the Powers of the Commissioners named in an Act,—and ends with the words,—and for rendering valid certain Acts done by them.	The whole act.
39 & 40 Geo. 3 c. 69	Repeal of Certain Duties Act 1800	An Act for repealing the Duties on Perfumery and on Licences for vending the same.	The whole act.
39 & 40 Geo. 3 c. 70	Paper Duty Act 1800	An Act the title of which begins with the words,—An Act to exempt from Duty Waste Paper imported,—and ends with the words,—Duties of Customs on Goods imported and exported.	The whole act.
39 & 40 Geo. 3 c. 71	Sale of Bread (No. 2) Act 1800	An Act to authorize Bakers and other Persons to sell Bread to His Majesty's Forces on their March, which shall not have been baked Twenty-four hours, and to indemnify all Persons by whom such Bread may have been so sold.	The whole act.
39 & 40 Geo. 3 c. 75	Militia Allowances (No. 2) Act 1800	An Act for making Allowances in certain Cases to Subaltern Officers of the Militia in Time of Peace.	The whole act.
39 & 40 Geo. 3 c. 76	Indemnity (West Indies) Act 1800	An Act for indemnifying Governors, Lieutenant Governors, and Persons acting as such, in the West India Islands, who have permitted the Importation and Exportation of Goods and Commodities in Foreign Bottoms.	The whole act.
39 & 40 Geo. 3 c. 77	Collieries and Mines Act 1800	An Act for the Security of Collieries and Mines, and for the better Regulation of Colliers and Miners.	Sections One, Two, Five, and Seven.
39 & 40 Geo. 3 c. 81	Hop Trade Act 1800	An Act to repeal an Act, made in the Fourteenth Year of the Reign of His present Majesty, intituled An Act to prevent Fraud in the buying and selling of Hops, and for the better Collection of the Duty on Hops; and to prevent Frauds by Hoppers in the Trade of Hops.	Section One, Section Four from "when" to "such current Year or Hop Season; and," and Sections Five to Seven, Nine, and Ten.
39 & 40 Geo. 3 c. 82	Duties on Foreign Hops Act 1800	An Act for suspending, until the Twentieth Day of August One thousand eight hundred, the Duties on Foreign Hops imported, and for granting other duties in lieu thereof.	The whole act.
39 & 40 Geo. 3 c. 87	Depredations on the Thames Act 1800	An Act the title of which begins with the words,—An Act for the more effectual Prevention of Depredations on the River Thames,—and ends with the words,—Boats upon the River Thames.	The whole act.
39 & 40 Geo. 3 c. 88	Crown Private Estate Act 1800	An Act to encourage the Disposition of certain Real and Personal Property of His Majesty, His Heirs and Successors; and also of the Real and Personal Property of Her Majesty, and of the Queen Consort for the Time being.	Sections Eleven and Twelve.
39 & 40 Geo. 3 c. 91	Exportation Act 1800	An Act to prohibit, until the Fifteenth Day of October One thousand eight hundred, the Exportation of Rice.	The whole act.
39 & 40 Geo. 3 c. 99	Pawnbrokers Act 1800	An Act for better regulating the Business of Pawnbrokers.	Sections One and Thirty-three.
39 & 40 Geo. 3 c. 100	Army and Navy (No. 2) Act 1800	An Act the title of which begins with the words,—An Act to authorize His Majesty to grant Commissions to Natives of the Seven United Provinces,—and ends with the words,—Natives to inlist as Soldiers in such Regiments under certain Restrictions.	The whole act.
39 & 40 Geo. 3 c. 101	Loans to Alexander Houston and Company, etc. Act 1800	An Act the title of which begins with the words,—An Act to give further Time for the Payment,—and ends with the words,—trading to the Islands of Grenada and Saint Vincent.	The whole act.
39 & 40 Geo. 3 c. 102	Loans or Exchequer Bills Act 1800	An Act for raising the Sum of Three millions five hundred thousand Pounds, by Loans or Exchequer Bills, for the Service of the Year One thousand eight hundred.	The whole act.
39 & 40 Geo. 3 c. 103	Loans or Exchequer Bills (No. 2) Act 1800	An Act for raising the Sum of Three Millions, by Loans or Exchequer Bills, for the Service of the Year One thousand eight hundred.	The whole act.
39 & 40 Geo. 3 c. 104	Loans or Exchequer Bills (No. 3) Act 1800	An Act for raising the further Sum of Three Millions, by Loans or Exchequer Bills, for the Service of the Year One thousand eight hundred.	The whole act.
39 & 40 Geo. 3 c. 105	Common Pleas of Lancaster Act 1800	An Act for the better regulating the Practice, and for preventing Delays in the Proceedings of the Court of Common Pleas at Lancaster.	The whole act.
39 & 40 Geo. 3 c. 108	Indemnity to Governor of Surinam Act 1800	An Act the title of which begins with the words,—An Act for indemnifying the Governor of Surinam,—and ends with the words,—for anything done in pursuance of such Permission.	The whole act.
39 & 40 Geo. 3 c. 109	Exchequer Bills Act 1800	An Act the title of which begins with the words,—An Act for granting to His Majesty a certain Sum of Money out of the Consolidated Fund,—and ends with the words,—Orders, lost, burnt, or otherwise destroyed.	Except the last Section, so far as it relates to Receipts of Cashiers of the Governor and Company of the Bank of England.
41 Geo. 3. (G.B.) c. 1	Exportation (No. 2) Act 1800	An Act the title of which begins with the words,—An Act to prohibit, until the First Day of November One thousand eight hundred and one,—and ends with the words,—Agreements that shall not have been performed in consequence thereof.	The whole act.
41 Geo. 3. (G.B.) c. 3	Use of Corn in Distillation of Spirits, etc. Act 1800	An Act to prohibit, until the First Day of January One thousand eight hundred and two, the Use of Corn in distilling of Spirits or making of Starch.	The whole act.
41 Geo. 3. (G.B.) c. 4	Duties on Hops Act 1800	An Act for suspending until the Twentieth Day of August One thousand eight hundred and one, the Duties on Hops imported, and for charging other Duties in lieu thereof.	The whole act.
41 Geo. 3. (G.B.) c. 5	Continuance of Laws (No. 2) Act 1800	An Act the title of which begins with the words,—An Act for continuing, until the Expiration of Forty Days,—and ends with the words,—Spirits from Wheat, and certain other Articles, in that Part of Great Britain called Scotland.	The whole act.
41 Geo. 3. (G.B.) c. 6	Malting Act 1800	An Act for shortening, until the Twenty-fifth Day of March One thousand eight hundred and one, the Time of keeping in Steep for malting, Barley damaged by Rain in the last Harvest.	The whole act.
41 Geo. 3. (G.B.) c. 7	Malt Duties Act 1800	An Act for continuing and granting to His Majesty certain Duties upon Malt, Mum, Cyder, and Perry, for the Service of the Year One thousand eight hundred and one.	The whole act.
41 Geo. 3. (G.B.) c. 8	Duty on Pensions, etc. (No. 2) Act 1800	An Act for continuing and granting to His Majesty a Duty on Pensions, Offices, and Personal Estates, in England, Wales, and the Town of Berwick upon Tweed; and certain Duties on Sugar, Malt, Tobacco, and Snuff, for the Service of the Year One thousand eight hundred and one.	The whole act.
41 Geo. 3. (G.B.) c. 9	Poor (No. 2) Act 1800	An Act to explain and amend an Act, made in the Twenty-second Year of the Reign of His present Majesty, intituled An Act for the better Relief and Employment of the Poor.	The whole act.
41 Geo. 3. (G.B.) c. 10	Bounties on Importation (No. 2) Act	An Act for granting Bounties on the Importation of Wheat, Barley, Rye, Oats, Pease, Beans, and Indian Corn, and of Barley, Rye, Oat, and Indian Meal, and Wheaten Flour and Rice.	The whole act.
41 Geo. 3. (G.B.) c. 11	Importation (No. 3) Act 1800	An Act to permit until the First Day of October One thousand eight hundred and one, the Importation of Herrings and other Fish, the Produce of the Fishery carried on in Nova Scotia, New Brunswick, Newfoundland, and on the Coast of Labrador, into this Kingdom, without Payment of Duty.	The whole act.
41 Geo. 3. (G.B.) c. 12	Poor (No. 3) Act	An Act the title of which begins with the words,—An Act for making better Provision for the Maintenance of the Poor,—and ends with the words,—Six Weeks after the meeting of the then next Session of Parliament.	The whole act.
41 Geo. 3. (G.B.) c. 14	Appropriation Act 1800	An Act for raising a certain Sum of Money by Loans or Exchequer Bills, for the Service of the Year One thousand eight hundred and one; and for appropriating the Supplies granted in this Session of Parliament.	The whole act.
41 Geo. 3. (G.B.) c. 15	Census Act 1800	An Act for taking an Account of the Population of Great Britain, and of the Increase or Diminution thereof.	The whole act.
41 Geo. 3. (G.B.) c. 18	Importation (No. 4) Act 1800	An Act to prohibit, until the First Day of October One thousand eight hundred and one, the Importation of Swedish Herrings into Great Britain.	The whole act.
41 Geo. 3. (G.B.) c. 19	Amendment of c. 10 of this Session Act 1800	An Act to remove Doubts arising upon the Construction of an Act of this Session of Parliament, intituled An Act for granting Bounties on the Importation of Wheat, Barley, Rye, Oats, Pease, Beans, and Indian Corn, and of Barley, Rye, Oat and Indian Meal, and Wheaten Flour and Rice.	The whole act.
41 Geo. 3. (G.B.) c. 20	Continuance of Laws (No. 3) Act 1800	An Act the title of which begins with the words,—An Act to revive and continue, until the Expiration of Six Weeks,—and ends with the words,—obstructing Seamen and others from pursuing their lawful Occupations.	The whole act.
41 Geo. 3. (G.B.) c. 24	Aliens Act 1800	An Act for continuing, until Six Months after the Conclusion of a general Peace, Three Acts, made in the Thirty-third and Thirty-eighth Years of His present Majesty's Reign, for establishing Regulations respecting Aliens arriving in this Kingdom, or resident therein, in certain Cases.	The whole act.
41 Geo. 3. (G.B.) c. 26	Turnpike Acts Continuance Act 1800	An Act for continuing, until the First Day of June One thousand eight hundred and one, the several Acts for regulating the Turnpike Roads in Great Britain, which expire at the End of the present Session of Parliament.	The whole act.
41 Geo. 3. (G.B.) c. 27	Grenada and Saint Vincent Traders Act 1800	An Act for extending the Time for the Payment of certain Sums of Money advanced by way of Loan to several Persons connected with and trading to the Islands of Grenada and Saint Vincent.	The whole act.
41 Geo. 3. (G.B.) c. 29	Army and Navy (No. 3) Act 1800	An Act the title of which begins with the words,—An Act for further continuing, until the First Day of August One thousand eight hundred and one,—and ends with the words,—Allegiance to His Majesty, or to incite them to Mutiny or Disobedience.	The whole act.
41 Geo. 3. (G.B.) c. 32	Habeas Corpus Suspension (No. 2) Act 1800	An Act the title of which begins with the words,—An Act for further continuing, until Six Weeks,—and ends with the words,—Persons as His Majesty shall suspect are conspiring against His Person and Government.	The whole act.

== See also ==
- Statute Law Revision Act
