= List of acts of the Parliament of Great Britain from 1758 =

This is a complete list of acts of the Parliament of Great Britain for the year 1758.

For acts passed until 1707, see the list of acts of the Parliament of England and the list of acts of the Parliament of Scotland. See also the list of acts of the Parliament of Ireland.

For acts passed from 1801 onwards, see the list of acts of the Parliament of the United Kingdom. For acts of the devolved parliaments and assemblies in the United Kingdom, see the list of acts of the Scottish Parliament, the list of acts of the Northern Ireland Assembly, and the list of acts and measures of Senedd Cymru; see also the list of acts of the Parliament of Northern Ireland.

The number shown after each act's title is its chapter number. Acts are cited using this number, preceded by the year(s) of the reign during which the relevant parliamentary session was held; thus the Union with Ireland Act 1800 is cited as "39 & 40 Geo. 3. c. 67", meaning the 67th act passed during the session that started in the 39th year of the reign of George III and which finished in the 40th year of that reign. Note that the modern convention is to use Arabic numerals in citations (thus "41 Geo. 3" rather than "41 Geo. III"). Acts of the last session of the Parliament of Great Britain and the first session of the Parliament of the United Kingdom are both cited as "41 Geo. 3".

Acts passed by the Parliament of Great Britain did not have a short title; however, some of these acts have subsequently been given a short title by acts of the Parliament of the United Kingdom (such as the Short Titles Act 1896).

Before the Acts of Parliament (Commencement) Act 1793 came into force on 8 April 1793, acts passed by the Parliament of Great Britain were deemed to have come into effect on the first day of the session in which they were passed. Because of this, the years given in the list below may in fact be the year before a particular act was passed.

== 32 Geo. 2 ==
The sixth session of the 11th Parliament of Great Britain, which met from 23 November 1758 until 2 June 1759.

This session was also traditionally cited as 32 G. 2.

=== Public acts ===
Short title	Citation	Royal assent
Long title
Importation Act 1758 (repealed)	32 Geo. 2. c. 1	14 December 1758
An Act to continue, for a limited Time, an Act made in the last Session of Parliament, intituled, "An Act to permit the Importation of Salted Beef, Pork, and Butter, from Ireland, for a limited Time;" (Note: Importation (No. 4) Act 1757 (31 Geo. 2. c. 28)) and to amend the said Act. (Repealed by Statute Law Revision Act 1867 (30 & 31 Vict. c. 59))
Exportation etc. Act 1758 (repealed)	32 Geo. 2. c. 2	14 December 1758
An Act to continue, for a further Time, the Prohibition of the Exportation of Corn, Malt, Meal, Flour, Bread, Biscuit, and Starch; and also to continue, for a further Time, the Prohibition of the making of Low Wines and Spirits from Wheat, Barley, Malt, or any other Sort of Grain, or from Meal or Flour; and to prohibit, for a limited Time, the making of Low Wines and Spirits from Bran. (Determined by Distillation Act 1759 (33 Geo. 2. c. 9) and repealed by Statute Law Revision Act 1867 (30 & 31 Vict. c. 59))
Land Tax Act 1758 (repealed)	32 Geo. 2. c. 3	14 December 1758
An Act for granting an Aid to His Majesty, by a Land Tax, to be raised in Great Britain, for the Service of the Year One Thousand Seven Hundred and Fifty-nine. (Repealed by Statute Law Revision Act 1867 (30 & 31 Vict. c. 59))
Taxation Act 1758 (repealed)	32 Geo. 2. c. 4	14 December 1758
An Act for continuing, and granting to His Majesty, certain Duties upon Malt, Mum, Cyder, and Perry, for the Service of the Year One Thousand Seven Hundred and Fifty-nine. (Repealed by Statute Law Revision Act 1867 (30 & 31 Vict. c. 59))
Mutiny Act 1758 (repealed)	32 Geo. 2. c. 5	23 March 1759
An Act for punishing Mutiny and Desertion; and for the better Payment of the Army and their Quarters. (Repealed by Statute Law Revision Act 1867 (30 & 31 Vict. c. 59))
Small Debts, Southwark, etc. Act 1758 (repealed)	32 Geo. 2. c. 6	23 March 1759
An Act to explain and amend an Act passed in the Twenty-second Year of His present Majesty's Reign, intituled, "An Act for the more easy and speedy Recovery of Small Debts, within the Town and Borough of Southwark, and the several Parishes of Saint Saviour, Saint Mary at Newington, Saint Mary Magdalen Bermondsey, Christ Church, Saint Mary Lambeth, and Saint Mary at Rotherhith, in the County of Surrey, and the several Precincts and Liberties of the same;" (Note: Small Debts, Southwark, etc. Act 1748 (22 Geo. 2. c. 47)) and for extending the Powers and Provisions of the said Act to such Part of the Eastern Half of the Hundred of Brixton, in the said County, as is not included in the said Act. (Repealed by County Courts Act 1846 (9 & 10 Vict. c. 95))
Indemnity Act 1758 (repealed)	32 Geo. 2. c. 7	23 March 1759
An Act to indemnify Persons who have omitted to qualify themselves for Offices and Employments within the Time limited by Law; and for allowing further Time for that Purpose. (Repealed by Statute Law Revision Act 1867 (30 & 31 Vict. c. 59))
Exportation Act 1758 (repealed)	32 Geo. 2. c. 8	23 March 1759
An Act for taking off the Prohibition of the Exportation of Corn, Malt, Meal, Flour, Bread, Biscuit, and Starch. (Repealed by Statute Law Revision Act 1867 (30 & 31 Vict. c. 59))
Marine Mutiny Act 1758 (repealed)	32 Geo. 2. c. 9	23 March 1759
An Act for the Regulation of His Majesty's Marine Forces while on Shore. (Repealed by Statute Law Revision Act 1867 (30 & 31 Vict. c. 59))
National Debt Act 1758 (repealed)	32 Geo. 2. c. 10	5 April 1759
An Act for granting to His Majesty a Subsidy of Poundage upon certain Goods and Merchandizes to be imported into this Kingdom; and an additional Inland Duty of Coffee and Chocolate; and for raising the Sum of Six Millions Six Hundred Thousand Pounds, by Way of Annuities and a Lottery, to be charged on the said Subsidy and additional Inland Duty. (Repealed by Statute Law Revision Act 1870 (33 & 34 Vict. c. 69))
Importation (No. 2) Act 1758 (repealed)	32 Geo. 2. c. 11	5 April 1759
An Act to permit the Free Importation of Cattle from Ireland, for a limited Time. (Repealed by Statute Law Revision Act 1867 (30 & 31 Vict. c. 59))
Discontinuance of Duties Act 1758 (repealed)	32 Geo. 2. c. 12	5 April 1759
An Act to discontinue, for a limited Time, the Duties payable upon Tallow imported from Ireland. (Repealed by Statute Law Revision Act 1867 (30 & 31 Vict. c. 59))
Fen Drainage Act 1758 (repealed)	32 Geo. 2. c. 13	5 April 1759
An Act for draining and preserving certain Fen Lands and Low Grounds in the Parishes of Somersham and Pidley with Fenton, and the Parish of Colne, in the County of Huntingdon. (Repealed by Fen Drainage Act 1775 (15 Geo. 3. c. 65))
Post Fines Act 1758 (repealed)	32 Geo. 2. c. 14	2 June 1759
An Act for the more regular and easy collecting, accompting for, and paying of, Post Fines, which shall be due to the Crown, or to Grantees thereof under the Crown; and for the Ease of Sheriffs in respect to the same. (Repealed by Statute Law Revision Act 1867 (30 & 31 Vict. c. 59))
Turnpike Roads (Scotland) Act 1758 (repealed)	32 Geo. 2. c. 15	2 June 1759
An Act for the better Preservation of the Turnpike Roads in that Part of Great Britain called Scotland. (Repealed by Statute Law Revision Act 1948 (11 & 12 Geo. 6. c. 62))
Thames, etc. Act 1758 (repealed)	32 Geo. 2. c. 16	2 June 1759
An Act to continue, amend, explain, and render more effectual, an Act made in the Sixth Year of the Reign of His present Majesty, (Note: River Thames (Lastage and Ballastage) Act 1732 (6 Geo. 2. c. 29)) for the better Regulation of Lastage and Ballastage in the River Thames; and to prevent putting of Rubbish, Ashes, Dirt, or Soil, into the said River, and in the Streets, Passages, and Kennels, in London, and in the Suburbs thereof in Middlesex and in Westminster, and such Part of the Dutchy of Lancaster as is in Middlesex; and for allowing a certain Quantity of Dung, Compost, Earth, or Soil, to be yearly shipped as Ballast, from the Lay-stalls in London, on board any Collier or Coasting Vessel. (Repealed by Thames Lastage and Ballastage Act 1805 (45 Geo. 3. c. xcviii) (Note: Incorrectly cited as "45 Geo. 3. c. xcvii" in the Chronological Table of the Statutes.) and City of London Sewers Act 1851 (14 & 15 Vict. c. xci))
Offences Against Excise Laws Act 1758 (repealed)	32 Geo. 2. c. 17	2 June 1759
An Act for obviating a Doubt, with respect to the summoning of Persons for Offences committed against, or Forfeitures incurred by, the Laws of Excise. (Repealed by Statute Law Revision Act 1867 (30 & 31 Vict. c. 59))
Persons Going Armed or Disguised Act 1758 (repealed)	32 Geo. 2. c. 18	2 June 1759
An Act to continue so much of an Act, made in the Nineteenth Year of the Reign of His present Majesty, (Note: Offences against Customs or Excise Act 1745 (19 Geo. 2. c. 34)) as relates to the further Punishment of Persons going armed or disguised, in Defiance of the Laws of Customs or Excise; and to the Relief of the Officers of the Customs, in Informations upon Seizures; and to appropriate certain Penalties mentioned in an Act made in the last Session of Parliament, (Note: Making of Bread Act 1757 (31 Geo. 2. c. 29)) for the due making of Bread, and to regulate the Price and Assize thereof; and to punish Persons who shall adulterate Meal, Flour, or Bread. (Repealed by Statute Law Revision Act 1867 (30 & 31 Vict. c. 59))
Wine Licences Act 1758 (repealed)	32 Geo. 2. c. 19	2 June 1759
An Act to explain and amend an Act passed in the Thirtieth Year of His present Majesty's Reign, (Note: National Debt Act 1757 (30 Geo. 2. c. 19)) for granting to His Majesty several Rates and Duties upon Indentures, Leases, Bonds, and other Deeds; and upon News Papers, Advertisments, and Almanacks; and upon Licenses for retailing Wine, and other Purposes in the said Act mentioned, so far as the same relates to some Provisions with regard to Licenses for retailing Wine, and to preserve the Privileges of the Two Universities in that Part of Great Britain called England, with respect to Licenses for retailing Wine. (Repealed by Statute Law Revision Act 1867 (30 & 31 Vict. c. 59))
Militia Act 1758 (repealed)	32 Geo. 2. c. 20	2 June 1759
An Act for enforcing the Execution of the Laws relating to the Militia; and for removing certain Difficulties, and preventing Inconveniencies, attending, or which may attend, the same. (Repealed by Statute Law Revision Act 1867 (30 & 31 Vict. c. 59))
Militia Pay Act 1758 (repealed)	32 Geo. 2. c. 21	2 June 1759
An Act for applying Money granted in this Session of Parliament, towards defraying the Charge of Pay and Cloathing for the Militia, from the Thirty-first Day of December One Thousand Seven Hundred and Fifty eight, to the Twenty-fifth Day of March One Thousand Seven Hundred and Sixty. (Repealed by Statute Law Revision Act 1867 (30 & 31 Vict. c. 59))
National Debt (No. 2) Act 1758 (repealed)	32 Geo. 2. c. 22	2 June 1759
An Act for adding certain Annuities, granted in the Year One Thousand Seven Hundred and Fifty-seven, to the Joint Stock of Three per Centum Annuities, consolidated by the Acts of the Twenty-fifth, (Note: National Debt (No. 2) Act 1751 (25 Geo. 2. c. 27)) Twenty-eighth, (Note: Supply, etc. Act 1755 (28 Geo. 2. c. 22)) and Twenty-ninth (Note: National Debt Act 1756 (29 Geo. 2. c. 7)) Years of His present Majesty's Reign; and for carrying the several Duties therein mentioned to the Sinking Fund; and for charging the Annuities on Single Lives, granted in the Year One Thousand Seven Hundred and Fifty-seven, on the Produce of the said Fund. (Repealed by Statute Law Revision Act 1870 (33 & 34 Vict. c. 69))
Continuance of Laws Act 1758 (repealed)	32 Geo. 2. c. 23	2 June 1759
An Act to continue several Laws therein mentioned, relating to the allowing a Drawback of the Duties upon the Exportation of Copper Bars imported; to the Encouragement of the Silk Manufactures; and for taking of several Duties on Merchandize exported, and reducing other Duties; to the Premium upon Masts, Yards, and Bowsprits, Tar, Pitch, and Turpentine; to the encouraging the Growth of Coffee in His Majesty's Plantations in America; to the securing the Duties upon Foreign-made Sail Cloth, and charging Foreign-made Sails with a Duty; and for enlarging the Time for Payment of the Duties omitted to be paid on the Indentures and Contracts of Clerks, Apprentices, or Servants; and also for making Affidavits of the Execution of Articles or Contracts of Clerks to Attornies or Solicitors, and filing thereof. (Repealed by Statute Law Revision Act 1867 (30 & 31 Vict. c. 59))
Plate (Duty on Dealer's Licence) Act 1758 (repealed)	32 Geo. 2. c. 24	2 June 1759
An Act to amend an Act made in the last Session of Parliament, (Note: Plate (Duty on Dealer's Licence) Act 1757 (31 Geo. 2. c. 32)) for repealing the Duty granted by an Act made in the Sixth Year of the Reign of His late Majesty, (Note: Plate Duty Act 1719 (6 Geo. 1. c. 11)) on Silver Plate; and for granting a Duty on Licenses to be taken out by all Persons dealing in Gold or Silver Plate, by permitting the Sale of Gold or Silver Plate in small Quantities without License; and by granting a Duty, instead of the Duty now payable upon Licenses to be taken out by certain Dealers in Gold or Silver Plate, and also a Duty upon Licenses to be taken out by Pawnbrokers dealing in Gold or Silver Plate, and Refiners of Gold or Silver. (Repealed by Customs and Inland Revenue Act 1890 (53 & 54 Vict. c. 8))
Naval Prize Act 1758 (repealed)	32 Geo. 2. c. 25	2 June 1759
An Act to explain and amend an Act made in the Twenty-ninth Year of His present Majesty's Reign, intituled, "An Act for the Encouragement of Seamen, and the more speedy and effectual manning His Majesty's Navy;" (Note: Naval Prize, etc. Act 1756 (29 Geo. 2. c. 34)) and for the better Prevention of Piracies and Robberies by the Crews of Private Ships of War. (Repealed by Naval Prize Acts Repeal Act 1864 (27 & 28 Vict. c. 23))
Milford Fortifications Act 1758	32 Geo. 2. c. 26	2 June 1759
An Act for applying a Sum of Money, granted in this Session of Parliament, towards carrying on the Works for fortifying and securing the Harbour of Milford in the County of Pembroke; and to amend and render more effectual an Act of the last Session of Parliament, (Note: Fortifications Act 1757 (31 Geo. 2. c. 38)) for applying a Sum of Money towards fortifying the said Harbour.
Coal Trade (London) Act 1758 (repealed)	32 Geo. 2. c. 27	2 June 1759
An Act for continuing, amending, explaining, and making more effectual, an Act made in the Nineteenth Year of His present Majesty's Reign, intituled, "An Act more effectually to prevent the Frauds and Abuses committed in the Admeasurement of Coals within the City and Liberty of Westminster, and that Part of the Dutchy of Lancaster adjoining thereto, and the several Parishes of Saint Giles in the Fields, Saint Mary le Bon, and such Part of the Parish of Saint Andrew Holbourn as lies in the County of Middlesex." (Note: Coal Trade (London) Act 1745 (19 Geo. 2. c. 35)) (Repealed by Westminster Coal Trade Act 1786 (26 Geo. 3. c. 108))
Debtors Imprisonment Act 1758 (repealed)	32 Geo. 2. c. 28	2 June 1759
An Act for Relief of Debtors, with respect to the Imprisonment of their Persons; and to oblige Debtors, who shall continue in Execution in Prison beyond a certain Time, and for Sums not exceeding what are mentioned in the Act, to make Discovery of, and deliver upon Oath, their Estates, for their Creditors Benefit. (Repealed by Statute Law Revision Act 1948 (11 & 12 Geo. 6. c. 62))
Excise Act 1758 (repealed)	32 Geo. 2. c. 29	2 June 1759
An Act for further regulating the Power of taking Samples of Foreign Spirituous Liquors by the Officers of Excise; and also for empowering the Traders to take such Samples before the Duties are charged. (Repealed by Statute Law Revision Act 1867 (30 & 31 Vict. c. 59))
Plymouth and Portsmouth Fortifications Act 1758	32 Geo. 2. c. 30	2 June 1759
An Act for making Compensation to the Proprietors of such Lands and Hereditaments as have been purchased for the better securing His Majesty's Docks, Ships, and Stores, at Chatham, Portsmouth, and Plymouth; and for better fortifying the Town of Portsmouth and Citadel of Plymouth, in Pursuance of an Act of the last Session of Parliament, (Note: Fortifications (No. 2) Act 1757 (31 Geo. 2. c. 39)) and for other Purposes therein mentioned.
Supply, etc. Act 1758 (repealed)	32 Geo. 2. c. 31	2 June 1759
An Act for granting to His Majesty certain Sums of Money out of the Sinking Fund; and for applying certain Monies remaining in the Exchequer, for the Service of the Year One Thousand Seven Hundred and Fifty-nine; and for Relief of Samuel Taylor, with respect to a Bond entered into by him for securing the Duties on Tobacco imported. (Repealed by Statute Law Revision Act 1867 (30 & 31 Vict. c. 59))
Importation (No. 3) Act 1758 (repealed)	32 Geo. 2. c. 32	2 June 1759
An Act for the more effectual preventing the fraudulent Importation of Cambricks and French Lawns. (Repealed by Customs Law Repeal Act 1825 (6 Geo. 4. c. 105))
Pension Duties Act 1758 (repealed)	32 Geo. 2. c. 33	2 June 1759
An Act to explain and amend an Act made in the last Session of Parliament, intituled, "An Act for granting to His Majesty several Rates and Duties upon Offices and Pensions, and upon Houses, and upon Windows or Lights; and for raising the Sum of Five Millions by Annuities and a Lottery, to be charged on the said Rates and Duties," (Note: Pension Duties Act 1757 (31 Geo. 2. c. 22)) so far as the same relates to the Rates and Duties on Offices and Pensions. (Repealed by Statute Law Revision Act 1948 (11 & 12 Geo. 6. c. 62) (Note: Incorrectly cited as "SLR 1958" in the Chronological Table of the Statutes.)))
Importation (No. 4) Act 1758 (repealed)	32 Geo. 2. c. 34	2 June 1759
An Act for the better preventing the Importation of the Woollen Manufactures of France into any of the Ports in The Levant Sea, by or on the Behalf of any of His Majesty's Subjects; and for the more effectual preventing the illegal Importation of Raw Silk and Mohair Yarn into this Kingdom. (Repealed by Statute Law Revision Act 1867 (30 & 31 Vict. c. 59))
Salaries of Judges Act 1758 (repealed)	32 Geo. 2. c. 35	2 June 1759
An Act for augmenting the Salaries of the Puisne Judges in the Court of King's Bench, the Judges in the Court of Common Pleas, the Barons of the Coif in the Court of Exchequer at Westminster, the Judges in the Courts of Session and Exchequer in Scotland, and Justices of Chester and the Great Sessions for the Counties in Wales. (Repealed by Statute Law Revision Act 1867 (30 & 31 Vict. c. 59))
Supply, etc. (No. 2) Act 1758 (repealed)	32 Geo. 2. c. 36	2 June 1759
An Act for enabling His Majesty to raise the Sum of One Million, for the Uses and Purposes therein mentioned; and for further appropriating the Supplies granted in this Session of Parliament. (Repealed by Statute Law Revision Act 1867 (30 & 31 Vict. c. 59))
Mansfield and Chesterfield Road Act 1758 (repealed)	32 Geo. 2. c. 37	23 March 1759
An Act for repairing and widening the High Road leading from the Town of Mansfield in the County of Nottingham, through the Towns of Pleasley, Glapwell, Heath, and Normenton, and the Liberty of Hasland, to the Turnpike Road leading from the Town of Derby to the Town of Chesterfield in the County of Derby. (Repealed by Mansfield and Chesterfield Road Act 1815 (55 Geo. 3. c. xvi) and Annual Turnpike Acts Continuance Act 1876 (39 & 40 Vict. c. 39))
Notts and Derby Roads Act 1758 (repealed)	32 Geo. 2. c. 38	23 March 1759
An Act for repairing and widening the Roads from Chappel Bar near the West End of the Town of Nottingham, to Newhaven, and from the Four Lane Ends near Oakerthorpe to Ashborne, and from the Cross Post on Wirksworth Moor, to join the Road leading from Chesterfield to Chappel-en-le-Frith, at or near Longston in the County of Derby, and from Selston to Annesley Woodhouse in the County of Nottingham. (Repealed by Nottingham and Derby Road Act 1799 (39 Geo. 3. c. xii) and Nottingham and Newhaven Turnpike Road Act 1855 (18 & 19 Vict. c. xcii))
Somerset Roads Act 1758 (repealed)	32 Geo. 2. c. 39	23 March 1759
An Act for repairing and widening the Roads from the East End of the Town of Chard to the South End of West Moor, and from the West End of the Yeovil Turnpike Road, through Ilminster, to Kenny Gate, and from the West End of Pease Marsh Lane to Horton, and from Saint Rane Hill to Ilminster, and from White Cross to Chillington Down, and from a Place called Three Oaks over Ilford Bridges, to Bridge Cross in the County of Somerset. (Repealed by Somerset Roads Act 1781 (21 Geo. 3. c. 104))
Somerset and Gloucester Roads Act 1758 (repealed)	32 Geo. 2. c. 40	23 March 1759
An Act for repairing several Roads leading to the Town of Bridgewater, in the County of Somerset; and for amending and rendering more effectual several Acts, for amending several Roads from the Cities of Gloucester and Bristol, and several other Roads in the said Acts mentioned, in the Counties of Somerset and Gloucester. (Repealed by Bridgwater (Somerset) Roads Act 1822 (3 Geo. 4. c. lxv))
Macclesfield and Buxton Road Act 1758 (repealed)	32 Geo. 2. c. 41	23 March 1759
An Act for repairing and widening the Road from the Cross at Broken Cross in Macclesfield in the County of Chester, through Macclesfield Forest, to the present Turnpike Road at the South End of the Township of Buxton in the County of Derby. (Repealed by Road from Macclesfield to the Buxton Turnpike Road Act 1821 (1 & 2 Geo. 4. c. xxxvi))
Stort Navigation Act 1758	32 Geo. 2. c. 42	23 March 1759
An Act for making the River Stort navigable, in the Counties of Hertford and Essex, from the new Bridge in the Town of Bishop Stortford, into the River Lee, near a Place called The Rye, in the County of Hertford.
Derbyshire Roads Act 1758 (repealed)	32 Geo. 2. c. 43	23 March 1759
An Act for repairing and widening the Road from Chesterfield to the Turnpike Road at Hernstone Lane Head, and also the Road branching from the said Road upon The East Moor, through Baslow and Wardlow, to the Joining of the said Roads again near Wardlow Mires, and also the Road leading between the said Road and Branch from Calver Bridge to Baslow Bridge, and also the Road from the Turnpike Road near Newhaven House to the Turnpike Road near Grindleford Bridge in the County of Derby. (Repealed by Chesterfield and Hernstone Lane Head Turnpike Roads Act 1864 (27 & 28 Vict. c. lxxiv))
Lincoln Roads Act 1758 (repealed)	32 Geo. 2. c. 44	23 March 1759
An Act to continue, amend, and make effectual, an Act passed in the Twelfth Year of the Reign of His present Majesty, intituled, "An Act for repairing the Roads from the North West Parts of the County of Lincoln through Nettlam Fields, Wragby Lane, and Baumber Fields, to The Wolds, or North East Part of the said County;" (Note: Lincoln (City) Roads Act 1738 (12 Geo. 2. c. 10)) and also for repairing and widening the Roads from the Well in East Gate in the City of Lincoln, and from the North West End of Horncastle, and from the Guide Post at the East End of Hainton, through Barkwith, to the Roads directed to be repaired by the said Act. (Repealed by Roads in Lincoln Act 1806 (46 Geo. 3. c. lxx))
South Molton Roads Act 1758 (repealed)	32 Geo. 2. c. 45	5 April 1759
An Act for repairing, widening, and rendering safe and commodious, several Roads leading from the Town of Southmolton, in the County of Devon. (Repealed by Southmolton Roads (Devon) Act 1839 (2 & 3 Vict. c. xlix))
Windsor Forest Road Act 1758 (repealed)	32 Geo. 2. c. 46	5 April 1759
An Act for repairing and widening the Road from a Place called The Old Gallows in the Parish of Sunning, in the County of Berks, through Wokingham, New Bracknowl, and Sunning Hill, to Virginia Water in the Parish of Egham in the County of Surrey. (Repealed by Sonning and Egham Road Act 1822 (3 Geo. 4. c. lxxxviii))
Stroudwater Navigation Act 1758	32 Geo. 2. c. 47	5 April 1759
An Act to amend and explain an Act made in the Third Year of His present Majesty's Reign, intituled, "An Act for making navigable the River Stroudwater, in the County of Gloucester, from the River Severn, at or near Famiload, to Wallbridge near the Town of Stroud in the same County." (Note: Stroudwater Navigation Act 1729 (3 Geo. 2. c. 13))
Wakefield to Austerlands Road Act 1758 (repealed)	32 Geo. 2. c. 48	5 April 1759
An Act for repairing the Road from Wakefield to Austerlands, in The West Riding of the County of York. (Repealed by Wakefield and Austerlands Road Act 1820 (1 Geo. 4. c. lxviii))
Norton Folgate, Middlesex (Lighting, etc.) Act 1758 (repealed)	32 Geo. 2. c. 49	5 April 1759
An Act for the better enlightening and cleansing the Open Places, Streets, Squares, Lanes, Courts, and other Passages, within the Part of the Manor and Liberty of Norton Folgate; otherwise Norton Folley, in the County of Middlesex, which is extra-parochial; and regulating the Nightly Watch and Beadles therein. (Repealed by Norton Folgate Improvement Act 1810 (50 Geo. 3. c. v))
Dorset Roads Act 1758 (repealed)	32 Geo. 2. c. 50	5 April 1759
An Act for repairing and widening the Roads from Oxdown Gate in Popham Lane to the City of Winchester, and from the said City, through Hursley, to Chandlers Ford, and from Hursley aforesaid to the Turnpike Road at Romsey, and from the said Turnpike Road, through Ringwood in the County of Southampton, to Longham Bridge and Winborne Minster in the County of Dorset. (Repealed by Winchester Roads Act 1823 (4 Geo. 4. c. cxx))
Bath Roads Act 1758 (repealed)	32 Geo. 2. c. 51	5 April 1759
An Act to explain, amend, and render more effectual, the Powers granted by several Acts of Parliament, for repairing several Roads leading to the City of Bath; and for amending several other Roads near the said City. (Repealed by Bath Roads Act 1793 (33 Geo. 3. c. 144))
Devon Roads Act 1758 (repealed)	32 Geo. 2. c. 52	5 April 1759
An Act for amending, widening, and keeping in Repair, the Road from the Hollow Way on the West Side of Lord Clifford's Park Gate, where the Exeter Turnpike ends, to a Place called Biddaford, in the County of Devon. (Repealed by Devon Roads Act 1780 (20 Geo. 3. c. 79))
Lincoln and Nottingham Roads Act 1758 (repealed)	32 Geo. 2. c. 53	5 April 1759
An Act for repairing and widening the Roads from Grantham in the County of Lincoln, through Bottesford and Bingham, to Nottingham Trent Bridge, and from Chappel Bar near to the West End of the Town of Nottingham to Saint Mary's Bridge in the Town of Derby, and from the Guide Post in the Parish of Lenton to Sawley Ferrey. (Repealed by Road from Grantham to Nottingham Trent Bridge Act 1825 (6 Geo. 4. c. xxiv) and Nottingham and Derby, and Lenton and Sawley Ferry Roads Act 1827 (7 & 8 Geo. 4. c. xxvii))
Dewsbury to Elland Road Act 1758 (repealed)	32 Geo. 2. c. 54	5 April 1759
An Act for repairing and widening the Road from Dewsbury to England, in the County of York. (Repealed by Road from Dewsbury to Ealand Act 1836 (6 & 7 Will. 4. c. cxviii))
Denbigh, Flint and Carnarvon Roads Act 1758 (repealed)	32 Geo. 2. c. 55	2 June 1759
An Act for repairing and widening the Roads from the Town of Mold to the Town of Denbigh, and from thence to Tal-y-Cafn and Conway; and from the Town of Wrexham to the Towns of Ruthin, Denbigh, and the Town and Port of Ruthland, in the Counties of Denbigh, Flint, and Carnarvon. (Repealed by Wrexham to Denbigh and Ruthin to Cerniogemawr Roads Act 1822 (3 Geo. 4. c. xliii) and Annual Turnpike Acts Continuance Act 1872 (35 & 36 Vict. c. 85))
Kelso Beer Duties Act 1758 (repealed)	32 Geo. 2. c. 56	2 June 1759
An Act for laying a Duty of Two Pennies Scots, or One Sixth Part of a Penny Sterling, upon every Scots Pint of Ale, Porter, and Beer, which shall be brewed for Sale, brought into, tapped, or sold, within the Town of Kelso in the Shire of Roxburgh, for finishing a Bridge cross the River Tweed; and for other Purposes therein mentioned. (Repealed by Statute Law Revision Act 1948 (11 & 12 Geo. 6. c. 62))
Lincoln and Notts Roads Act 1758 (repealed)	32 Geo. 2. c. 57	2 June 1759
An Act for repairing and widening the Roads from a Place called Littlegate at the Top of Leadenham Hill in the County of Lincoln, to the West End of Barnby Gate in Newark upon Trent, and from the Guide Post at the Division of Kelham and Muskham Lanes to Mansfield, and from Southwell to Oxton in the County of Nottingham. (Repealed by Road from Grantham to Nottingham Trent Bridge Act 1825 (6 Geo. 4. c. xxiv) (Note: Cited without a regnal year, as "G 4 c xxiv", in the Chronological Table of the Statutes.))
Guildford Streets Act 1758 (repealed)	32 Geo. 2. c. 58	2 June 1759
An Act for establishing, regulating, and maintaining, a Nightly Watch, and for enlightening the open Places and Streets, within the Town of Guilford in the County of Surrey. (Repealed by Local Government Board's Provisional Orders Confirmation (Bath, etc.) Act 1876 (39 & 40 Vict. c. cci))
Plymouth (Poor Relief) Act 1758 (repealed)	32 Geo. 2. c. 59	2 June 1759
An Act to explain, amend, and render more effectual, an Act passed in the Sixth Year of the Reign of Her late Majesty Queen Anne, intituled, "An Act for erecting a Workhouse in the Town and Borough of Plymouth, in the County of Devon; and for setting the Poor on Work, and maintaining them there;" (Note: Plymouth Workhouse Act 1707 (6 Ann. c. 46)) and for obliging the Mayor and Commonalty of Plymouth to contribute towards the County Rates of Devon; and for applying, for the Relief of the Poor in the said Workhouse, certain Surplus Monies, which have formerly arisen by the Assessments for raising the Land Tax in the said Town. (Repealed by Statute Law (Repeals) Act 2008 (c. 12))
Derby to Newcastle-under-Lyne Road Act 1758 (repealed)	32 Geo. 2. c. 60	2 June 1759
An Act for repairing and widening the Road from the Town of Derby to the Town of Newcastle under Lyne, in the County of Stafford. (Repealed by Newcastle-under-Lyme Roads Act 1823 (4 Geo. 4. c. li), Uttoxeter District of Roads Act 1823 (4 Geo. 4. c. lix) and Road from Derby to Uttoxeter Act 1825 (6 Geo. 4. c. i))
Manchester (School Mills) Act 1758 (repealed)	32 Geo. 2. c. 61	2 June 1759
An Act for discharging the Inhabitants of the Town of Manchester, in the County Palatine of Lancaster, from the Custom of grinding their Corn and Grain, except Malt, at certain Water Corn-Mills in the said Town, called The School Mills; and for making a proper Recompense to the Feoffees of such Mills. (Repealed by Statute Law (Repeals) Act 1978 (c. 45))
Clyde Bridge Act 1758 (repealed)	32 Geo. 2. c. 62	2 June 1759
An Act for improving the Navigation of the River Clyde to the City of Glasgow; and for building a Bridge cross the said River, from the said City, to the Village of Gorbells. (Repealed by Glasgow Bridges Act 1845 (8 & 9 Vict. c. cxxxiii) and Clyde Navigation Consolidation Act 1858 (21 & 22 Vict. c. cxlix))
Wilts Roads Act 1758 (repealed)	32 Geo. 2. c. 63	2 June 1759
An Act to continue and amend Two Acts, One made in the Thirteenth Year of the Reign of His late Majesty King George the First, (Note: Chippenham Roads Act 1726 (13 Geo. 1. c. 13)) and the other in the Seventeenth Year of His present Majesty, (Note: Wiltshire Roads (No. 2) Act 1743 (17 Geo. 2. c. 27)) for repairing certain Roads leading from Chippenham, and for repairing several Roads leading from Chippenham Bridge; (Note: The town bridge in Chippenham, Wiltshire. 51°27′33″N 2°07′01″W) and to repeal so much of an Act, made in the Twenty-ninth Year of His present Majesty, (Note: Berkshire Roads Act 1756 (29 Geo. 2. c. 77)) as relates to the Road between the said Bridge and Lower Stanton in the County of Wilts. (Repealed by Roads from Studley Bridge and from Chippenham Act 1818 (58 Geo. 3. c. xliii))
Wear Navigation Act 1758	32 Geo. 2. c. 64	2 June 1759
An Act for making and completing the Navigation of the River Wear, from and including South Biddick, or Biddickford, in the County of Durham, to the City of Durham; and for repealing so much of an Act, made in the Twentieth Year of His present Majesty's Reign, intituled, "An Act for the better Preservation and Improvement of the River Wear, and Port and Haven of Sunderland in the County of Durham," (Note: River Wear Navigation Act 1746 (20 Geo. 2. c. 18)) as relates to making the said River navigable between the said Two Places, called South Biddick or Biddickford and New Bridge in the County of Durham.
Wear Navigation (No. 2) Act 1758 (repealed)	32 Geo. 2. c. 65	2 June 1759
An Act for continuing, amending, and rendering more effectual, so much of an Act made in the Twentieth Year of His present Majesty's Reign, intituled, "An Act for the better Preservation and Improvement of the River Wear, and Port and Haven of Sunderland, in the County of Durham," as relates to the Port and Haven of Sunderland, and the River Wear, between South Biddick or Biddickford and the said Port and Haven. (Repealed by River Wear and Sunderland Harbour Improvement Act 1809 (49 Geo. 3. c. xli))
Hereford and Salop Roads Act 1758 (repealed)	32 Geo. 2. c. 66	2 June 1759
An Act for amending and widening the Roads leading from Stretford's Bridge in the County of Hereford, to The New Inn in the Parish of Winstanstow, in the County of Salop; and also the Road from Blue Mantle Hall, near Mortimer's Cross, to Aymstrey in the said County of Hereford; and for repealing so much of an Act made in the Twenty-second Year of the Reign of His present Majesty, (Note: Leominster Roads Act 1748 (22 Geo. 2. c. 15)) as relates to the Road from Mortimer's Cross to Aymstrey Bridge. (Repealed by Stretford's Bridge and Cross Moor Roads (Herefordshire and Salop.) Act 1824 (5 Geo. 4. c. cxlii) (Note: Incorrectly cited as "5 Geo. 4. c. clxii" in the Chronological Table of the Statutes.))
Lewes and Eastbourne Road Act 1758 (repealed)	32 Geo. 2. c. 67	2 June 1759
An Act for repairing the Road from the South End of the South Street in the Parish of South Malling, near the Town of Lewes, to Glynd Bridge, and from thence, through Firle Street under the Hill, to Longbridge in the Parish of Alfriston in the County of Sussex. (Repealed by Lewes and Eastbourne, and Polegate and Hailsham Roads Act 1819 (59 Geo. 3. c. x) (Note: Incorrectly cited as "59 Geo. 4. c. clxii" in the Chronological Table of the Statutes.))
Devon Roads (No. 2) Act 1758 (repealed)	32 Geo. 2. c. 68	2 June 1759
An Act for repairing and widening the Road from Modbury, through the Town of Plympton, to the North End of Lincotta Lane in the County of Devon. (Repealed by Roads from Modbury through Plymouth Act 1823 (4 Geo. 4. c. cix))
Westmorland Roads Act 1758 (repealed)	32 Geo. 2. c. 69	2 June 1759
An Act for repairing, amending, and widening, the Roads from the South West End of Nether Bridge (Note: Nether Bridge, Kendal, Cumbria, where the A6 road meets the A65 road. 54°19′15″N 2°44′42″W) in the County of Westmorland, by Sizerghfellside, (Note: Sizergh Fell, Cumbria.) to Leven's Bridge; (Note: Levens Bridge, which takes the A6 road across the River Kent, north of Levens Hall, Cumbria. 54°15′37″N 2°46′30″W) and from thence, through the Town of Millthrop, (Note: Milnthorpe, Cumbria.) to Dixes; and from the Town of Millthrop aforesaid to Hangbridge; (Note: Hang Bridge, on the B6384 road between Milnthorpe and Holme, Cumbria. 54°12′53″N 2°44′59″W) and from thence to join the Heron Syke Turnpike Road at the Guide Post near Clawthrop Hall (Note: A former junction on the A6070 road north of Clawthorpe Hall, Clawthorpe, Cumbria. The former road from Milnthorpe was removed when the M6 motorway was built. 54°11′38″N 2°43′21″W) in the County aforesaid. (Repealed by Road from Nether Bridge and from Millthrop (Westmorland) Act 1822 (3 Geo. 4. c. xii))
Yorkshire Roads Act 1758 (repealed)	32 Geo. 2. c. 70	2 June 1759
An Act for repairing and widening the Road leading from the East Side of Barnsley Common, in the County of York, to the Middle of Grange Moor, and from thence to White Cross; and also the Road from the Guide Post in Barugh to a Rivulet called Barugh Brook; and from thence, for Two Hundred Yards over and beyond the same Rivulet or Brook, into the Township of Cawthorne in the said County. (Repealed by Roads from Barnsley Common and from Barugh (Yorkshire) Act 1823 (4 Geo. 4. c. lxvi))
Wetherby to Grassington Road Act 1758 (repealed)	32 Geo. 2. c. 71	2 June 1759
An Act for repairing and widening the High Road from Wetherby to Grassington, in the County of York. (Repealed by Ripon and Pateley Bridge Road Act 1821 (1 & 2 Geo. 4. c. xi), Road from Knaresborough to Ripon and Pateley Bridge Act 1826 (7 Geo. 4. c. xiv) and Annual Turnpike Acts Continuance Act 1871 (34 & 35 Vict. c. 115))

=== Private acts ===
Short title	Citation	Royal assent
Long title
Ecton Inclosure Act 1758 (repealed)	32 Geo. 2. c. 1 Pr.	14 December 1758
An Act for dividing and enclosing the Common Fields, Common Pastures, Common Meadows, Common Grounds, and Waste Grounds, in the Parish of Ecton, in the County of Northampton. (Repealed by Northampton Act 1988 (c. xxix))
Bridgewater Canal Act 1758	32 Geo. 2. c. 2 Pr.	23 March 1759
An Act to enable the most Noble Francis Duke of Bridgewater to make a Navigable Cut, or Canal, from a certain Place in the Township of Salford, to or near Worsley Mill and Middlewood in the Manor of Worsley, and to or near a Place called Hollin Ferry in the County Palatine of Lancaster.
Honington Inclosure Act 1758	32 Geo. 2. c. 3 Pr.	23 March 1759
An Act for dividing and enclosing the Open, Arable, Meadow, Pasture, and Waste Grounds, in the Parish of Honington, in the County of Warwick.
Establishing and rendering more effectual an agreement concerning Bentley and Arksey (Yorkshire) inclosures.	32 Geo. 2. c. 4 Pr.	23 March 1759
An Act for establishing and rendering effectual certain Articles of Agreement, for enclosing and dividing the Commons and Waste Grounds, in the Townships of Bentley and Arksey, and Parish of Arksey, in the County of York.
Staunton Inclosure Act 1758	32 Geo. 2. c. 5 Pr.	23 March 1759
An Act for dividing and enclosing the Open Fields and Meadows, Common Pasture, and Waste Grounds, in the Manor and Parish of Staunton, in the County of Nottingham.
Preston upon Stower Inclosure Act 1758	32 Geo. 2. c. 6 Pr.	23 March 1759
An Act for dividing and enclosing the Open Arable, Meadow, Pasture, and Waste Grounds, in the Parish of Preston upon Stower, in the County of Gloucester.
Great Glen (Leicestershire) inclosure (nether and south end fields).	32 Geo. 2. c. 7 Pr.	23 March 1759
An Act for dividing and enclosing certain Open and Common Fields in Great Glen, in the County of Leicester, called The Nether or South End Fields, and all the Lands and Grounds within the same Fields.
Fillingham Inclosure Act 1758	32 Geo. 2. c. 8 Pr.	23 March 1759
An Act for dividing and enclosing several Common Fields and Grounds, within the Manor of Fillingham, in the County of Lincoln.
Willoughby Inclosure Act 1758	32 Geo. 2. c. 9 Pr.	23 March 1759
An Act for dividing and enclosing the Common Fields, Common Pastures, Common Meadows, and Common Ground, within the Manor and Parish of Willoughby, in the County of Warwick.
John Cooke divorce from Susannah Cooper.	32 Geo. 2. c. 10 Pr.	23 March 1759
An Act to dissolve the Marriage of John Cooke Esquire with Susanna Cooper his now Wife; and to enable him to marry again; and for other Purposes therein mentioned.
Christopher Codrington's name.	32 Geo. 2. c. 11 Pr.	23 March 1759
An Act to enable Christopher Codrington Esquire, now called Christopher Bethell, and his Heirs Male, to take and use the Surname and Arms of Bethell, pursuant to the Will of Slingsby Bethell Esquire, deceased.
Confirming, establishing and continuing Richard Wilbraham's name.	32 Geo. 2. c. 12 Pr.	23 March 1759
An Act for continuing, establishing, and confirming, the Surname and Arms of Bootle unto Richard Wilbraham Bootle Esquire, formerly called Richard Wilbraham, and Mary Wilbraham Bootle his Wife, and their Issue, pursuant to the Will of Sir Thomas Bootle Knight, deceased.
Thomas Peckham's name.	32 Geo. 2. c. 13 Pr.	23 March 1759
An Act to enable Thomas Peckham Esquire, and his Issue, to take and use the Surname of Fowle.
John Coant's name.	32 Geo. 2. c. 14 Pr.	23 March 1759
An Act to enable John Coant Gentleman and his Issue to take and use the Surname of Wakelin.
Naturalization of Casper Schombart, John Spitta, Gisbert Van Voorst, Frederick de Chevrigny, Conrad Harksen, Christopher Strothoff, and Jasper Richter.	32 Geo. 2. c. 15 Pr.	23 March 1759
An Act for naturalizing Caspar Schombart, John Spitta, Gysbert Van Voorst, Frederick de Chevrigny, Conrad Harksen, Christopher Strothoff, and Jasper Lawrence Richter.
Naturalization of Thomas Pecholier, Peter Harrison and Samuel Graff.	32 Geo. 2. c. 16 Pr.	23 March 1759
An Act for naturalizing Thomas Pecholier, Peter Harisson, and Samuel Bernard Graff.
Naturalization of Phillippis Willem Cassimir Van Stranbenzee.	32 Geo. 2. c. 17 Pr.	23 March 1759
An Act for naturalizing Philippus Willem Casimir Van Straubenzee Esquire.
Exemplifying or enrolling an indenture of settlement and Earl of Arran's will and codicil and making them evidence in all British and Irish courts.	32 Geo. 2. c. 18 Pr.	5 April 1759
An Act for exemplifying or enrolling an Indenture of Settlement, and the Will and Codicils, of the late Earl of Arran, deceased; and making the same Evidence as well in Ireland as Great Britain.
Neithorp and Wickham Inclosure Act 1758	32 Geo. 2. c. 19 Pr.	5 April 1759
An Act for dividing and enclosing One Open and Common Field called Neithrop Field, and several Parcels of Land called Bull's Close, The Hooks Common, Balkes Leys, White Post, Cow Layer Paddock, Great March Causeways, and Ley, within the Township and Liberties of Neithrop and Wickham, and in the Parish of Banbury, in the County of Oxford.
Redness and Swinefleet Pastures (Yorkshire) Inclosure Act 1758	32 Geo. 2. c. 20 Pr.	5 April 1759
An Act for establishing and rendering effectual certain Articles of Agreement, for the enclosing and dividing certain Commons or Waste Grounds, called Redness and Swinefleet Pastures, in the County of York.
Vesting lands in Buckinghamshire, Northamptonshire, Salop. and Staffordshire, devised by Evelyn Duke of Kingston's will, in the present Duke of Kingston, in fee simple and for settling other lands and manors in Nottinghamshire in lieu thereof.	32 Geo. 2. c. 21 Pr.	2 June 1759
An Act for vesting divers Manors, Lands, and Hereditaments, in the Counties of Bucks, Northampton, Salop, and Stafford, devised by the Will of Evelyn late Duke of Kingston, in the present Duke of Kingston, in Fee Simple; and for settling other Manors, Lands, and Hereditaments, in the County of Nottingham, of greater Value, in Lieu thereof, to the like Uses.
Confirming and establishing John Duke of Bedford's and Ambrose, Judy and Elizabeth Reddall's estates exchange.	32 Geo. 2. c. 22 Pr.	2 June 1759
An Act for confirming and establishing an Exchange, agreed to be made between the most Noble John Duke of Bedford and Ambrose Reddall Gentleman, Judy his Wife, and Elizabeth their only Child.
Duke of Beaufort's Estate Act 1758	32 Geo. 2. c. 23 Pr.	2 June 1759
An Act for vesting Part of the Estates entailed by the Will of the most Noble Charles Noel Duke of Beaufort deceased, in Trustees, to be sold; and for purchasing other Estates, to be settled to the like Uses; and for empowering the Guardian and Trustees named in the said Will to make Leases of the said Duke's Estates, in the Counties of Gloucester, Wilts, Hants, Devon, Dorset, Glamorgan, and Brecon, during the Minority of his Children.
Margaret Brydges Marchioness of Caernarvon's and Margaret Nicoll's real and leasehold estates: settling for benefit of Marquis and Marchioness of Caernarvon and their issue and applying part of the Marchioness' personal estate to purposes therein mentioned.	32 Geo. 2. c. 24 Pr.	2 June 1759
An Act for settling the Real and Leasehold Estates of the most Honourable Margaret Brydges, (commonly called Marchioness of Carnarvan, Wife of the most Honourable James Brydges Esquire, commonly called Marquis of Carnarvan, and late Margaret Nicoll Spinster, an Infant), for the Benefit of the said Marquis and Marchioness and their Issue; and for applying Part of the Personal Estate of the said Marchioness for the Purposes therein mentioned.
William late Marquis of Powis' estate in Montgomeryshire: empowering Henry Arthur Earl and Barbara Countess of Powis to make leases for 21 years or 3 lives at the improved rent.	32 Geo. 2. c. 25 Pr.	2 June 1759
An Act for empowering Henry Arthur Earl of Powis and Barbara Countess of Powis to make Leases of the Estate late of William Marquis of Powis, deceased, in the County of Montgomery, for Twenty-one Years, or Three Lives, at the improved Rent.
Making a partition and division of lands and hereditaments in Surrey, agreed to be purchased by Thomas Lord Onslow and settling and limiting them for the benefit of those claiming under his marriage settlement and will and also for selling timber growing on his estate.	32 Geo. 2. c. 26 Pr.	2 June 1759
An Act for making a Partition and Division of certain Lands and Hereditaments, in the County of Surrey, agreed to be purchased by Thomas late Lord Onslow; and for settling and limiting the same, for the Benefit of the several Persons claiming under his Marriage Settlement and Will, respectively; and also for selling and disposing of Timber, growing on the Estate devised by his Will, for the Purposes therein mentioned.
Duchess of Buckinghamshire and Normanby's personal estate: raising money to renew a lease of manors and estates in Yorkshire.	32 Geo. 2. c. 27 Pr.	2 June 1759
An Act for raising Money, out of the Personal Estate of the late Dutchess of Buckinghamshire and Normanby, deceased, to renew a Lease of certain Manors and Estates, in the County of York, in the Manner, and for the Purposes, therein mentioned.
Enabling William Walley to sell three undivided fourth parts of a messuage and other lands in Hayes (Kent) to William Pitt in fee simple and for purchasing and settling other lands with proceeds. Also to enable the named trustees in William Cleaver's will to convey certain lands in Hayes to said William Pitt, in fee simple, in exchange for part of the first mentioned lands.	32 Geo. 2. c. 28 Pr.	2 June 1759
An Act to enable William Walley and others to sell and convey Three undivided Fourth Parts of a Messuage or Farm, and several Pieces or Parcels of Land and Hereditaments, lying in or near the Parish of Hayes, in the County of Kent, unto the Right Honourable William Pitt, in Fee Simple; and for investing the Purchase-money in other Lands and Hereditaments, to be settled to the same Uses and Estates as the said Three undivided Fourth Parts are now subject to; and to enable the Trustees named in the Will of William Cleaver the Elder, deceased, to convey certain Pieces or Parcels of Land, in the Parish of Hayes aforesaid, Part of the Estate devised by the Will and Codicil of the said William Cleaver, unto the said William Pitt, in Fee Simple, in Exchange for Part of the said first-mentioned Lands.
Repeal of an Act concerning Charles Bagot's name and for explaining, altering and better carrying into execution the agreement therein mentioned. (31 Geo. 2. c. 17)	32 Geo. 2. c. 29 Pr.	2 June 1759
An Act to repeal an Act made in the last Session of Parliament, intituled, "An Act to enable Charles Bagot, now called Charles Chester, and his Sons, to take the Surname of Chester; and for carrying an Agreement therein mentioned into Execution; and for explaining and altering that Agreement, and giving better Directions for carrying the same, so explained and altered, into Execution.
Executing Sir Edward Blackett's marriage settlement by a settlement with variations and provisions more beneficial to the issue of the marriage.	32 Geo. 2. c. 30 Pr.	2 June 1759
An Act for carrying into Execution the Articles made on the Marriage of Sir Edward Blackett Baronet with Dame Ann his Wife, by a Settlement to be made, with and under certain Variations and Provisions, more beneficial for the Issue of the said Marriage.
Empowering Edward and William Bouverie to make leases of Chester's Key and other buildings in London, devised by Bartholomew Clarke's and Hitch Younge's will.	32 Geo. 2. c. 31 Pr.	2 June 1759
An Act to empower the Honourable Edward Bouverie and William Bouverie, respectively, to make Leases of Chester's Key and Brewer's Key, and other Tenements and Buildings in the City of London, devised by the Wills of Bartholomew Clarke and Hitch Younge Esquires, deceased.
Catherine Widrington's estates: empowering certain persons to enfranchise customary lands and hereditaments, parcel of Nicol Forest, Solport and Bewcastle manors (Cumberland) directed to be settled to certain uses.	32 Geo. 2. c. 32 Pr.	2 June 1759
An Act to empower certain Persons to enfranchise several Customary Lands and Hereditaments, Parcel of the several Manors of Nicol Forest, Solport, and Bewcastle, in the County of Cumberland, late the Estates of the Honourable Catherine Widdrington Widow, deceased, directed to be settled to certain Uses by the Will and Codicil of the said Catherine Widdrington; and for other Purposes therein mentioned.
Charles William Molyneux's estate: transferring to his guardians a power of leasing contained in the marriage settlement of Richard Viscount Molyneux.	32 Geo. 2. c. 33 Pr.	2 June 1759
An Act for transferring to the Guardians of Charles William Molyneux, an Infant, a certain Power of Leasing, contained in the Marriage Settlement of Richard late Lord Viscount Molyneux, deceased, during the Minority, and for the Benefit, of the said Infant.
Exchange of lands between Samuel Wegg and St. Paul's Catheral.	32 Geo. 2. c. 34 Pr.	2 June 1759
An Act to exchange Lands, between Samuel Wegg Esquire and the Dean and Chapter of the Cathedral Church of Saint Paul in the City of London.
Denys' Rolle's estate in Cornwall and Devon: vesting in him in fee simple and settling of other lands in Devon.	32 Geo. 2. c. 35 Pr.	2 June 1759
An Act for vesting divers Lands and Hereditaments, in the Counties of Cornwall and Devon, settled and entailed on Denys Rolle Esquire and his Issue, in him, in Fee Simple; and for settling other Lands and Hereditaments, in the said County of Devon, of greater Value, to the same Uses.
James and Elizabeth Barry's estates: vesting the manor of Duxford (Cambridgeshire) in trustees, to be conveyed to Richard Crop and settling other estates in Yorkshire to uses of marriage articles.	32 Geo. 2. c. 36 Pr.	2 June 1759
An Act for vesting the Manor of Duxford, and divers Lands and Hereditaments, in the County of Cambridge, Part of the settled Estates of James Barry Esquire and Elizabeth his Wife, in Trustees, to be conveyed to Richard Crop Esquire, pursuant to Articles; and for settling other Estates, in the County of York, of greater Value, in Lieu thereof, to the Uses of their Marriage Articles.
John Caryll's Estate Act 1758	32 Geo. 2. c. 37 Pr.	2 June 1759
An Act for Sale of the Inheritance of Part of the settled Estate of John Caryll Esquire, in the County of Sussex, to discharge Encumbrances affecting the same.
William Warburton's Estate Act 1758	32 Geo. 2. c. 38 Pr.	2 June 1759
An Act to empower William Warburton Esquire to make Leases of Part of his settled Estate in Malvern Chace, for Ninety-nine Years, in order for the cultivating and improving of the same.
Thomas Buckley's Estate Act 1758	32 Geo. 2. c. 39 Pr.	2 June 1759
An Act for Sale of Part of the settled Estates of Thomas Buckley Esquire, in the County of Lancaster, for discharging an Encumbrance affecting the same prior to his Marriage Settlement.
Plunkett's Estate Act 1758	32 Geo. 2. c. 40 Pr.	2 June 1759
An Act for giving further Time to Trustees, therein named, to execute certain Trusts vested in them in and by an Act of Parliament made in the Sixteenth Year of the Reign of his present Majesty, intituled, "An Act for vesting the Remainder in Fee of several Lands in Ireland in Trustees, in order to sell the same to Protestant Purchasers." (Note: Plunkett's Estate Act 1742 (16 Geo. 2. c. 21 Pr.))
Loughborough Inclosure Act 1758	32 Geo. 2. c. 41 Pr.	2 June 1759
An Act for dividing and enclosing several Open Fields, Meadows, and Commons, within the Lordship and Liberty of Loughborough, in the County of Leicester.
Little Barrington Inclosure Act 1758	32 Geo. 2. c. 42 Pr.	2 June 1759
An Act for dividing and enclosing certain Open and Common Fields called Little Barrington Common Fields, and a Common or Waste called The Downs, within the Manor of Little Barrington in the County of Gloucester.
Hoton Inclosure Act 1758	32 Geo. 2. c. 43 Pr.	2 June 1759
An Act for dividing and enclosing the Open and Common Fields of Hoton, in the County of Leicester, and all the Lands and Grounds within the same Fields.
Sileby Inclosure Act 1758	32 Geo. 2. c. 44 Pr.	2 June 1759
An Act for dividing and enclosing the Open Arable Fields, Open Meadows, and Common Pasture Grounds, in the Parish of Sileby, in the County of Leicester.
Harmston Inclosure Act 1758	32 Geo. 2. c. 45 Pr.	2 June 1759
An Act for enclosing and dividing the Common Fields and Common Grounds of and in the Manor and Parish of Harmston, in the County of Lincoln.
Everton Inclosure Act 1758	32 Geo. 2. c. 46 Pr.	2 June 1759
An Act for dividing and enclosing several Fields, Meadows, Pastures, Common and Waste Grounds, in the Parish of Everton, in the County of Nottingham.
Breedon, Tonge, and Wilson (Leicestershire) Inclosure Act 1758	32 Geo. 2. c. 47 Pr.	2 June 1759
An Act for dividing and enclosing the Open and Common Fields of Breedon, Tonge, and Wilson, in the Manor of Breedon and County of Leicester, and certain Commonable and Waste Grounds within the respective Liberties thereof.
East Cotham (Yorkshire) inclosures and extinguishing the lord of the manor's right of warren in grounds called Sea Batts or Coney Warren in East Cotham.	32 Geo. 2. c. 48 Pr.	2 June 1759
An Act for enclosing and dividing the Common Fields in the Manor of East Cotham, in the County of York; and extinguishing the Right of Warren of the Lord of the said Manor in Part of a Tract of Ground called The Sea Batts, or Coney Warren, in East Cotham aforesaid.
Thistleton Inclosure Act 1758	32 Geo. 2. c. 49 Pr.	2 June 1759
An Act for dividing and enclosing the Open Fields and Meadows, Common Pasture and Waste Grounds, in the Manor of Thistleton, in the County of Rutland.
Slapton Inclosure Act 1758	32 Geo. 2. c. 50 Pr.	2 June 1759
An Act for dividing and enclosing the Common Fields, Common Pastures, Common Meadows, Common Grounds, and Waste Grounds, in the Manor and Parish of Slapton, in the County of Northampton.
Oadby Inclosure Act 1758	32 Geo. 2. c. 51 Pr.	2 June 1759
An Act for dividing and enclosing the Open and Common Fields of Oadby, in the County of Leicester, and all the Lands and Grounds within the same Fields.
Burstall Inclosure Act 1758	32 Geo. 2. c. 52 Pr.	2 June 1759
An Act for dividing and enclosing certain Open, Common, and Arable Fields, Meadows, Pastures, and Waste Grounds, within the Manor of Burstall, in the Parish of Belgrave, in the County of Leicester.
Coleby Inclosure Act 1758	32 Geo. 2. c. 53 Pr.	2 June 1759
An Act for dividing and enclosing several Open Fields and Commonable Lands, within the Manor and Parish of Coleby, in the County of Lincoln.
Desford and Peckleton (Leicestershire) inclosures.	32 Geo. 2. c. 54 Pr.	2 June 1759
An Act for dividing and enclosing the Open and Common Fields of Desford, in the County of Leicester, and the Lands and Grounds therein; and also such Lands in the Lordship of Peckleton, in the said County, as lie open to the said Fields.
Barton or Barton in Fabis (Nottinghamshire) Inclosure Act 1758	32 Geo. 2. c. 55 Pr.	2 June 1759
An Act for dividing and enclosing several Open and Common Fields, Common Meadows, Common Pastures, and Common Grounds, in the Manor and Lordship of Barton, otherwise Barton in Fabis, in the several Parishes of Barton and Clifton, in the County of Nottingham.
Bolton upon Dearne Inclosure Act 1758	32 Geo. 2. c. 56 Pr.	2 June 1759
An Act for dividing and enclosing certain Open and Common Fields, Meadows, Common Pastures, and Waste Grounds, in the Parish or Township of Bolton upon Dearne, in the County of York.
Bishop's Waltham Inclosure Act 1758	32 Geo. 2. c. 57 Pr.	2 June 1759
An Act for dividing and enclosing certain Open Arable Fields, in the Manor of Bishop's Waltham, in the County of Southampton.
Trevor Name and Arms Act 1758	32 Geo. 2. c. 58 Pr.	2 June 1759
An Act to enable Arthur Hill Esquire and Arthur his Son, and their Issue Male, to take the Name and Arms of Trevor.
Robert Dobyns' name.	32 Geo. 2. c. 59 Pr.	2 June 1759
An Act to enable Robert Dobyns Esquire, now called Robert Yate, and his First and other Sons, and their Heirs Male, to take and use the Surname of Yate, in Pursuance of the Will of Walter Yate Esquire, deceased.
Naturalization of John Christian and John Henry Suhring.	32 Geo. 2. c. 60 Pr.	2 June 1759
An Act for naturalizing John Christian Suhring and John Henry Suhring.

=== Sources ===
- Pickering, Danby, ed. (1766). "Anno tricesimo secundo Georgii II". The Statutes at Large. Vol. 22: From the 30th to the 33d Year of King George II. Cambridge: Joseph Bentham. pp. 399–538 – via Internet Archive.
- Pickering, Danby, ed. (1766). "Anno tricesimo secundo Georgii II". The Statutes at Large. Vol. 22: From the 30th to the 33d Year of King George II. Cambridge: Joseph Bentham. pp. 399–538 – via Google Books.
- Pickering, Danby, ed. (1766). "Anno tricesimo secundo Georgii II". The Statutes at Large. Vol. 22: From the 30th to the 33d Year of King George II. Cambridge: Joseph Bentham. pp. 399–538 – via Internet Archive.
- Journals of the House of Commons. Vol. 28. London: His Majesty's Stationery Office. 1803. pp. 317–626 – via Google Books.
- Chronological Table of and Index to the Statutes. Vol. 1: To the End of the Session 59 Vict. Sess. 2 (1895) (13th ed.). London: Her Majesty's Stationery Office. 1896. p. 119 – via Google Books.

== See also ==
- List of acts of the Parliament of Great Britain
