= Habeas Corpus Suspension Act 1776 =

Act of the Parliament of Great Britain

- Act of Parliament
- Parliament of Great Britain
- Long title: An act to empower his Majesty to secure and detain persons charged with, or suspected of, the crime of high treason, committed in any of his Majesty's colonies or plantations in America, or on the high seas, or the crime of piracy.
- Citation: 17 Geo. 3. c. 9
- Territorial extent: England and Wales; Scotland

Dates
- Royal assent: 3 March 1776
- Commencement: 31 October 1776 (Note: Start of session.)
- Expired: 1 January 1778 (Note: Section 1.)
- Repealed: 21 August 1871
Other legislation
Amended by	Habeas Corpus Suspension Act 1778; Habeas Corpus Suspension Act 1779; Habeas Corpus Suspension Act 1780; Habeas Corpus Suspension Act 1781; Habeas Corpus Suspension Act 1782
Repealed by	Statute Law Revision Act 1871

Status: Repealed

Text of statute as originally enacted

The Habeas Corpus Suspension Act 1776 (17 Geo. 3. c. 9), also known as the Habeas Corpus Suspension Act 1777 or the Treason Act 1777, was an act of the Parliament of Great Britain passed during the American Revolution. It required that anyone who was charged with or suspected of high treason or piracy in America or on the high seas be held in custody without bail or trial until 1 January 1778. Bail could only be granted by an order of the Privy Council, signed by six members of the council.

== Subsequent developments ==
Habeas Corpus Suspension Act 1778
- Act of Parliament
- Parliament of Great Britain
- Long title: An Act for continuing an Act made in the last Session of Parliament, intituled, "An Act to empower His Majesty to secure and detain Persons charged with or suspected of the Crime of High Treason, committed in any of His Majesty's Colonies or Plantations in America, or on the High Seas, or the Crime of Piracy."
- Citation: 18 Geo. 3. c. 1
- Territorial extent: Great Britain; British America

Dates
- Royal assent: 10 December 1777
- Commencement: 20 November 1777
- Expired: 1 January 1779
- Repealed: 21 August 1871
Other legislation
Amends	Habeas Corpus Suspension Act 1776
Repealed by	Statute Law Revision Act 1871
Relates to	Habeas Corpus Suspension Act 1779; Habeas Corpus Suspension Act 1780; Habeas Corpus Suspension Act 1781; Habeas Corpus Suspension Act 1782

Status: Repealed

Text of statute as originally enacted

Habeas Corpus Suspension Act 1779
- Act of Parliament
- Parliament of Great Britain
- Long title: An Act for further continuing an Act, made in the Seventeenth Year of the Reign of His present Majesty, intituled, "An Act to empower His Majesty to secure and detain Persons charged with, or suspected of, the Crime of High Treason, committed in any of His Majesty's Colonies or Plantations in America, or on the High Seas, or the Crime of Piracy."
- Citation: 19 Geo. 3. c. 1
- Territorial extent: Great Britain; British America

Dates
- Royal assent: 16 December 1778
- Commencement: 26 November 1778
- Expired: 1 January 1780
- Repealed: 21 August 1871
Other legislation
Amends	Habeas Corpus Suspension Act 1776
Repealed by	Statute Law Revision Act 1871
Relates to	Habeas Corpus Suspension Act 1778; Habeas Corpus Suspension Act 1780; Habeas Corpus Suspension Act 1781; Habeas Corpus Suspension Act 1782

Status: Repealed

Text of statute as originally enacted

Habeas Corpus Suspension Act 1780
- Act of Parliament
- Parliament of Great Britain
- Long title: An Act for further continuing an Act made in the Seventeenth Year of the Reign of His present Majesty, intituled, "An Act to empower His Majesty to secure and detain Persons charged with, or suspected of, the Crime of High Treason, committed in any of His Majesty's Colonies or Plantations in America, or on the High Seas, or the Crime of Piracy."
- Citation: 20 Geo. 3. c. 5
- Territorial extent: Great Britain; British America

Dates
- Royal assent: 15 December 1779
- Commencement: 25 November 1779
- Expired: 1 January 1781
- Repealed: 21 August 1871
Other legislation
Amends	Habeas Corpus Suspension Act 1776
Repealed by	Statute Law Revision Act 1871
Relates to	Habeas Corpus Suspension Act 1778; Habeas Corpus Suspension Act 1779; Habeas Corpus Suspension Act 1781; Habeas Corpus Suspension Act 1782

Status: Repealed

Text of statute as originally enacted

Habeas Corpus Suspension Act 1781
- Act of Parliament
- Parliament of Great Britain
- Long title: An Act for further continuing an Act made in the Seventeenth Year of the Reign of His present Majesty, intituled, "An Act to empower His Majesty to secure and detain Persons charged with, or suspected of, the Crime of High Treason, committed in any of His Majesty's Colonies or Plantations in America, or on the High Seas, or the Crime of Piracy."
- Citation: 21 Geo. 3. c. 2
- Territorial extent: Great Britain; British America

Dates
- Royal assent: 27 November 1780
- Commencement: 31 October 1780
- Expired: 1 January 1782
- Repealed: 21 August 1871
Other legislation
Amends	Habeas Corpus Suspension Act 1776
Repealed by	Statute Law Revision Act 1871
Relates to	Habeas Corpus Suspension Act 1778; Habeas Corpus Suspension Act 1779; Habeas Corpus Suspension Act 1780; Habeas Corpus Suspension Act 1782

Status: Repealed

Text of statute as originally enacted

Habeas Corpus Suspension Act 1782
- Act of Parliament
- Parliament of Great Britain
- Long title: An Act for further continuing an Act made in the Seventeenth Year of the Reign of His present Majesty, intituled, "An Act to empower His Majesty to secure and detain Persons charged with, or suspected of the Crime of High Treason, committed in any of His Majesty's Colonies or Plantations in America, or on the High Seas, or the Crime of Piracy."
- Citation: 22 Geo. 3. c. 1
- Territorial extent: Great Britain; British America

Dates
- Royal assent: 20 December 1781
- Commencement: 27 November 1781
- Expired: 1 January 1783
- Repealed: 21 August 1871
Other legislation
Amends	Habeas Corpus Suspension Act 1776
Repealed by	Statute Law Revision Act 1871
Relates to	Habeas Corpus Suspension Act 1778; Habeas Corpus Suspension Act 1779; Habeas Corpus Suspension Act 1780; Habeas Corpus Suspension Act 1781

Status: Repealed

Text of statute as originally enacted

The act was due to expire on 1 January 1778, but this was extended annually to 1 January of each successive year until 1 January 1783 by the Habeas Corpus Suspension Act 1778 (18 Geo. 3. c. 1), the Habeas Corpus Suspension Act 1779 (19 Geo. 3. c. 1), the Habeas Corpus Suspension Act 1780 (20 Geo. 3. c. 5), the Habeas Corpus Suspension Act 1781 (21 Geo. 3. c. 2) and the Habeas Corpus Suspension Act 1782 (20 Geo. 3. c. 1), when it was finally allowed to expire.

The whole act was repealed by section 1 of, and the schedule to, the Statute Law Revision Act 1871 (34 & 35 Vict. c. 116), which came into force on 21 August 1871.

== See also ==
- Treason Act
- Habeas Corpus Suspension Act (disambiguation)
