= List of acts of the Parliament of Great Britain from 1780 =

This is a complete list of acts of the Parliament of Great Britain for the year 1780.

For acts passed until 1707, see the list of acts of the Parliament of England and the list of acts of the Parliament of Scotland. See also the list of acts of the Parliament of Ireland.

For acts passed from 1801 onwards, see the list of acts of the Parliament of the United Kingdom. For acts of the devolved parliaments and assemblies in the United Kingdom, see the list of acts of the Scottish Parliament, the list of acts of the Northern Ireland Assembly, and the list of acts and measures of Senedd Cymru; see also the list of acts of the Parliament of Northern Ireland.

The number shown after each act's title is its chapter number. Acts are cited using this number, preceded by the year(s) of the reign during which the relevant parliamentary session was held; thus the Union with Ireland Act 1800 is cited as "39 & 40 Geo. 3 c. 67", meaning the 67th act passed during the session that started in the 39th year of the reign of George III and which finished in the 40th year of that reign. Note that the modern convention is to use Arabic numerals in citations (thus "41 Geo. 3" rather than "41 Geo. III"). Acts of the last session of the Parliament of Great Britain and the first session of the Parliament of the United Kingdom are both cited as "41 Geo. 3".

Acts passed by the Parliament of Great Britain did not have a short title; however, some of these acts have subsequently been given a short title by acts of the Parliament of the United Kingdom (such as the Short Titles Act 1896).

Before the Acts of Parliament (Commencement) Act 1793 came into force on 8 April 1793, acts passed by the Parliament of Great Britain were deemed to have come into effect on the first day of the session in which they were passed. Because of this, the years given in the list below may in fact be the year before a particular act was passed.

== 20 Geo. 3 ==
The sixth session of the 14th Parliament of Great Britain, which met from 25 November 1779 until 8 July 1780.

This session was also traditionally cited as 20 G. 3.

=== Public acts ===
Short title	Citation	Royal assent
Long title
Parliament Act 1780 (repealed)	20 Geo. 3. c. 1	7 December 1779
An Act for holding the ensuing Election of a Knight of the Shire for the County of Southampton, at the Town of New Alresford, in the said County. (Repealed by Statute Law Revision Act 1871 (34 & 35 Vict. c. 116))
Land Tax Act 1780 (repealed)	20 Geo. 3. c. 2	15 December 1779
An Act for granting an Aid to His Majesty, by a Land Tax to be raised in Great Britain, for the Service of the Year One thousand seven hundred and eighty. (Repealed by Statute Law Revision Act 1871 (34 & 35 Vict. c. 116))
Malt Duties Act 1780 (repealed)	20 Geo. 3. c. 3	15 December 1779
An Act for continuing and granting to His Majesty certain Duties upon Malt, Mum, Cyder and Perry, for the Service of the Year One thousand seven hundred and eighty. (Repealed by Statute Law Revision Act 1871 (34 & 35 Vict. c. 116))
Continuance of Laws Act 1780 (repealed)	20 Geo. 3. c. 4	15 December 1779
An Act for continuing an Act made in the last Session of Parliament, (Note: Importation of Silk Act 1779 (19 Geo. 3. c. 9)) for allowing the Importation of fine organzined Italian thrown Silk, in any Ships or Vessels, for a limited Time. (Repealed by Statute Law Revision Act 1871 (34 & 35 Vict. c. 116))
Habeas Corpus Suspension Act 1780 (repealed)	20 Geo. 3. c. 5	15 December 1779
An Act for further continuing an Act made in the Seventeenth Year of the Reign of His present Majesty, intituled, "An Act to empower His Majesty to secure and detain Persons charged with, or suspected of, the Crime of High Treason, committed in any of His Majesty's Colonies or Plantations in America, or on the High Seas, or the Crime of Piracy." (Note: Habeas Corpus Suspension Act 1776 (17 Geo. 3. c. 9)) (Repealed by Statute Law Revision Act 1871 (34 & 35 Vict. c. 116))
Trade Act 1780 (repealed)	20 Geo. 3. c. 6	23 December 1779
An Act to repeal certain Acts made in Great Britain, which restrain the Trade and Commerce of Ireland with foreign Parts. (Repealed by Statute Law Revision Act 1871 (34 & 35 Vict. c. 116))
Customs Act 1780 (repealed)	20 Geo. 3. c. 7	23 December 1779
An Act to amend an Act made in the Eighteenth Year of the Reign of His present Majesty, intituled, "An Act to explain and amend so much of an Act made in the Fourth Year of the Reign of His present Majesty, as relates to the preventing the clandestine Conveyance of Sugar and Paneles from the British Colonies and Plantations in America, into Great Britain." (Note: Customs Act 1778 (18 Geo. 3. c. 58)) (Repealed by Customs Law Repeal Act 1825 (6 Geo. 4. c. 105))
Militia Act 1780 (repealed)	20 Geo. 3. c. 8	23 December 1779
An Act to indemnify such Officers of the Militia as have not transmitted to the Clerks of the Peace Descriptions of their Qualifications, and Certificates of their having taken the Oaths as required; and for allowing further Time for the Delivery of Descriptions of Qualifications by such Officers of the Militia; and for obliging the Captain Lieutenant to deliver in a Description of his Qualification. (Repealed by Statute Law Revision Act 1861 (24 & 25 Vict. c. 101))
Prize Act 1780 (repealed)	20 Geo. 3. c. 9	24 February 1780
An Act for extending the Provisions of Two Acts made in the Eighteenth Year of His present Majesty's Reign, (Note: Prize Act 1778 (18 Geo. 3. c. 15)) and in the last Session of Parliament, (Note: Prize Act 1779 (19 Geo. 3. c. 5)) with respect to bringing Prize Goods into this Kingdom, to Spanish Prize Goods; and for repealing so much of the said last-mentioned Act as relates to the Certificates for Prize Tea and East India Goods exported from this Kingdom to Ireland; for the Removal of East India Goods condemned as Prize at any Out Port to London for Sale, and of Prize Goods for Exportation; and for reducing the Duty on Foreign Prize Tobacco. (Repealed by Naval Prize Acts Repeal Act 1864 (27 & 28 Vict. c. 23))
Trade (No. 2) Act 1780 (repealed)	20 Geo. 3. c. 10	24 February 1780
An Act to allow the Trade between Ireland and the British Colonies and Plantations in America and the West Indies, and the British Settlements on the Coast of Africa, to be carried on in like Manner as it is now carried on between Great Britain and the said Colonies and Settlements. (Repealed by Customs Law Repeal Act 1825 (6 Geo. 4. c. 105))
Kelso Beer Duties Act 1780 (repealed)	20 Geo. 3. c. 11	21 March 1780
An Act for continuing the Term and Powers of an Act, made in the Thirty-second Year of the Reign of His late Majesty King George the Second, intituled, "An Act for laying a Duty of Two Pennies Scots, or One Sixth Part of a Penny Sterling, upon every Scots Pint of Ale, Porter and Beer, which shall be brewed for Sale, brought into, tapped or sold, within the Town of Kelso, in the Shire of Roxburgh, for finishing a Bridge cross the River Tweed; and for other Purposes therein mentioned." (Note: Kelso Beer Duties Act 1758 (32 Geo. 2. c. 56)) (Repealed by Statute Law Revision Act 1948 (11 & 12 Geo. 6. c. 62))
Mutiny Act 1780 (repealed)	20 Geo. 3. c. 12	21 March 1780
An Act for punishing Mutiny and Desertion; and for the better Payment of the Army and their Quarters. (Repealed by Statute Law Revision Act 1871 (34 & 35 Vict. c. 116))
Marine Mutiny Act 1780 (repealed)	20 Geo. 3. c. 13	21 March 1780
An Act for the Regulation of His Majesty's Marine Forces while on Shore. (Repealed by Statute Law Revision Act 1871 (34 & 35 Vict. c. 116))
Militia Pay Act 1780 (repealed)	20 Geo. 3. c. 14	21 March 1780
An Act for defraying the Charge of the Pay and Cloathing of the Militia in that Part of Great Britain called England, for One Year, beginning the Twenty-fifth Day of March One thousand seven hundred and Eighty. (Repealed by Statute Law Revision Act 1871 (34 & 35 Vict. c. 116))
Saint Mary-le-Bone Church Act 1780 (repealed)	20 Geo. 3. c. 15	21 March 1780
An Act for repealing so much of an Act, made in the Twelfth Year of His present Majesty, (Note: Saint Marylebone Church Act 1772 (12 Geo. 3. c. 40)) intituled, "An Act for amending and rendering more effectual an Act made in the Tenth Year of His Majesty's Reign, (Note: Parish Church of St. Marylebone Act 1770 (10 Geo. 3. c. 112)) intituled, 'An Act for building a new Parish Church, and declaring the present Parish Church a Chapel; for making a Cœmetery or Church Yard, and for building an House for the Use of the Minister of the Parish of Saint Mary-le bone, in the County of Middlesex," as empowers the Vestrymen of the said Parish to build a Church upon a certain Parcel of Ground in the said Parish, belonging to Henry William Portman Esquire, heretofore Parcel of a certain Close called The Fifteen Acres.'" (Repealed by St. Marylebone Parish Church and Chapels Act 1811 (51 Geo. 3. c. cli))
National Debt Act 1780 (repealed)	20 Geo. 3. c. 16	21 March 1780
An Act for raising a certain Sum of Money by way of Annuities; and for establishing a Lottery. (Repealed by Statute Law Revision Act 1870 (33 & 34 Vict. c. 69))
Parliamentary Elections Act 1780 (repealed)	20 Geo. 3. c. 17	21 March 1780
An Act to remove certain Difficulties relative to Voters at County Elections. (Repealed by Statute Law Revision Act 1871 (34 & 35 Vict. c. 116) and Representation of the People Act 1918 (7 & 8 Geo. 5. c. 64))
Trade with Ireland Act 1780 (repealed)	20 Geo. 3. c. 18	21 March 1780
An Act to repeal so much of an Act made in the Nineteenth Year of the Reign of Henry the Seventh, (Note: Coin Act 1503 (19 Hen. 7 c. 5)) or of any other Acts which prohibit the exporting, carrying or conveying Coin out of this Realm into Ireland; and so much of certain Acts made in Great Britain, which prohibit the Importation of Foreign Hops into Ireland, and which take off the Drawback upon Hops exported from Great Britain to Ireland; and to allow the Importation into, and Exportation from Ireland, of such Goods as may be imported into, or exported from Great Britain, by the Merchants of England trading to the Levant Seas. (Repealed by Statute Law Revision Act 1871 (34 & 35 Vict. c. 116))
Continuance of Laws (No. 2) Act 1780 (repealed)	20 Geo. 3. c. 19	21 March 1780
An Act to continue several Laws relating to the better securing the lawful Trade of His Majesty's Subjects to and from the East Indies, and for the more effectual preventing all His Majesty's Subjects trading thither under Foreign Commissions; to the importing Salt from Europe into the Province of Quebec in America; to the permitting the free Importation of Raw Goat Skins into this Kingdom; to the allowing the Exportation of certain Quantities of Wheat and other Articles, to His Majesty's Sugar Colonies in America; and to the permitting the Exportation of Tobacco Pipe Clay from this Kingdom to the British Sugar Colonies or Plantations in the West Indies. (Repealed by Statute Law Revision Act 1871 (34 & 35 Vict. c. 116))
Supply of Seamen Act 1780 (repealed)	20 Geo. 3. c. 20	21 March 1780
An Act for the better Supply of Mariners and Seamen to serve in His Majesty's Ships of War, and on board Merchant Ships, and other trading Ships and Vessels. (Repealed by Statute Law Revision Act 1871 (34 & 35 Vict. c. 116))
Worcester (Streets) Act 1780 (repealed)	20 Geo. 3. c. 21	4 May 1780
An Act for amending and rendering more effectual Two Acts, passed in the Tenth (Note: Worcester (Improvement) Act 1770 (10 Geo. 3. c. 22)) and Eleventh (Note: Worcester (Water Supply, etc.) Act 1771 (11 Geo. 3. c. 13)) Years of His present Majesty's Reign, for better supplying the City of Worcester and the Liberties thereof with Water; and for the better paving and lighting the said City; and for removing and preventing all Obstructions and Annoyances therein. (Repealed by Worcester Water Act 1823 (4 Geo. 4. c. lxix))
Maidstone (Poor Relief) Act 1780 (repealed)	20 Geo. 3. c. 22	4 May 1780
An Act for the better Government and Regulation of the Poor in the Town and Parish of Maidstone, in the County of Kent. (Repealed by Statute Law Revision Act 1948 (11 & 12 Geo. 6. c. 62))
Navy Act 1780 (repealed)	20 Geo. 3. c. 23	4 May 1780
An Act to amend an Act, made in the last Session of Parliament, intituled, "An Act for the Encouragement of Seamen, and the more speedy and effectual Manning His Majesty's Navy;" (Note: Navy Act 1779 (19 Geo. 3. c. 67)) and for making further Provisions for those Purposes. (Repealed by Naval Prize Acts Repeal Act 1864 (27 & 28 Vict. c. 23))
Kirkcudbright Roads Act 1780 (repealed)	20 Geo. 3. c. 24	4 May 1780
An Act for converting into Money the Statute Labour in the Stewartry of Kirkcudbright, for the Purpose of repairing the Highways, Bridges and Ferries, within the said Stewartry. (Repealed by Kirkcudbright Roads, Statute Labour, Bridges and Ferries Act 1818 (58 Geo. 3. c. lxxi))
Customs (No. 2) Act 1780 (repealed)	20 Geo. 3. c. 25	4 May 1780
An Act for repealing the Duties payable upon Pot and Pearl Ashes, Wood and Weed Ashes, imported into Great Britain, and for granting other Duties in lieu thereof, for a limited Time. (Repealed by Statute Law Revision Act 1871 (34 & 35 Vict. c. 116))
Aberystwyth Harbour Act 1780 (repealed)	20 Geo. 3. c. 26	4 May 1780
An Act for repairing, enlarging and preserving the Harbour of Aberystwith, in the County of Cardigan. (Repealed by Aberystwyth Harbour Act 1836 (6 & 7 Will. 4. c. xli) and Aberystwyth Harbour Act 1987 (c. xiv))
Whitney Bridge Act 1780	20 Geo. 3. c. 27	4 May 1780
An Act for building a Bridge across the River Wye, between Whitney and Clifford, in the County of Hereford.
Stamp Duties Act 1780 (repealed)	20 Geo. 3. c. 28	4 May 1780
An Act for granting to His Majesty several additional Duties on Advertisements, and certain Duties on Receipts for Legacies, or for any Share of a Personal Estate divided by Force of the Statute of Distributions, or the Custom of any Province or Place. (Repealed by Statute Law Revision Act 1871 (34 & 35 Vict. c. 116))
Trade (No. 3) Act 1780 (repealed)	20 Geo. 3. c. 29	4 May 1780
An Act to protect Goods or Merchandize of the Growth, produce or Manufacture of the Islands of Grenada and the Grenadines, on board Neutral Vessels bound to Neutral Ports, during the present Hostilities. (Repealed by Statute Law Revision Act 1871 (34 & 35 Vict. c. 116))
Customs (No. 3) Act 1780 (repealed)	20 Geo. 3. c. 30	4 May 1780
An Act for granting to His Majesty several additional Duties upon Wines and Vinegar imported into this Kingdom. (Repealed by Statute Law Revision Act 1871 (34 & 35 Vict. c. 116))
Bounty on Corn Act 1780 (repealed)	20 Geo. 3. c. 31	4 May 1780
An Act for allowing a Bounty on the Exportation of British Corn and Grain, in Ships, the Property of Persons of any Kingdom or State in Amity with His Majesty. (Repealed by Statute Law Revision Act 1871 (34 & 35 Vict. c. 116))
Walton-Shepperton Bridge (Rebuilding and Tolls) Act 1780 (repealed)	20 Geo. 3. c. 32	4 May 1780
An Act for enlarging the Powers of an Act, made in the Twentieth Year of His late Majesty King George the Second, (Note: Walton-Shepperton Bridge (Building and Tolls) Act 1746 (20 Geo. 2. c. 22)) for building a Bridge cross the River Thames, from the Parish of Walton upon Thames, in the County of Surrey, to Shepperton, in the County of Middlesex. (Repealed by Statute Law Revision Act 1948 (11 & 12 Geo. 6. c. 62))
Rolls Estate Act 1780 (repealed)	20 Geo. 3. c. 33	4 May 1780
An Act to explain and amend an Act, (Note: Rolls Estate Act 1777 (17 Geo. 3. c. 59)) made in the Seventeenth Year of the Reign of His present Majesty, intituled, "An Act to repeal an Act, (Note: Rolls Estate Act 1660 (12 Cha. 2. c. 36)) made in the Twelfth Year of the Reign of King Charles the Second, intituled, 'The Master of the Rolls empowered to make Leases for Years, in order to new build the old Houses belonging to the Rolls;' and for the better regulating the Method of granting Leases of the said Rolls Estate for the future; and for making Compensation to the Earl of Macclesfield and Sir Thomas Sewell, for their beneficial Rights and Interests in certain Leases made of the Rolls Estate; and for regulating the Method of making Leases of the said Estate for the future." (Repealed by Statute Law Revision Act 1871 (34 & 35 Vict. c. 116))
Salt Duties Act 1780 (repealed)	20 Geo. 3. c. 34	8 May 1780
An Act for granting to His Majesty additional Duties upon Salt; and for regulating the Exportation of Salt to the Isle of Man. (Repealed by Statute Law Revision Act 1861 (24 & 25 Vict. c. 101))
Duties on Malt, etc. Act 1780 (repealed)	20 Geo. 3. c. 35	26 May 1780
An Act for granting to His Majesty additional Duties upon Malt and upon Low Wines and Spirits made for Home Consumption, and upon Foreign Spirits imported into Great Britain, and upon the Produce of the said several Duties; and for granting a Duty on Licences to be taken out by all Persons trading in, vending or selling of Coffee, Tea or Chocolate. (Repealed by Statute Law Revision Act 1861 (24 & 25 Vict. c. 101))
Poor Apprentices Act 1780 (repealed)	20 Geo. 3. c. 36	26 May 1780
An Act for obviating Doubts touching the binding and receiving of Poor Children Apprentices, in pursuance of several Acts of Parliament made for the Relief of the Poor within particular incorporated Hundreds or Districts; and for ascertaining the Settlement of Bastard Children born in the Houses of Industry within such Hundreds or Districts. (Repealed by Statute Law Revision Act 1871 (34 & 35 Vict. c. 116))
Volunteers Act 1780 (repealed)	20 Geo. 3. c. 37	26 May 1780
An Act to continue for a limited Time, so much of an Act made in the last Session of Parliament, (Note: Recruiting Act 1779 (19 Geo. 3. c. 10)) for the more easy and better recruiting His Majesty's Land Forces and Marines, as relates to the Encouragement of Volunteers. (Repealed by Recruiting Act 1783 (23 Geo. 3. c. 37))
Plymouth, Sheerness, Gravesend, Tilbury (Fortifications) Act 1780	20 Geo. 3. c. 38	26 May 1780
An Act to vest certain Messuages, Lands, Tenements and Hereditaments in Trustees, for the better securing His Majesty's Docks, Ships and Stores at Plymouth and Sheerness; and for better defending the Passage of the River Thames at Gravesend and Tilbury Fort.
Tobacco Act 1780 (repealed)	20 Geo. 3. c. 39	19 June 1780
An Act to admit to an Entry in this Kingdom under certain Restrictions, Tobacco imported not directly from the Place of its Growth or Produce; and for granting an additional Duty on such Tobacco, during the present Hostilities. (Repealed by Statute Law Revision Act 1871 (34 & 35 Vict. c. 116))
Completion of Somerset House Act 1780 (repealed)	20 Geo. 3. c. 40	19 June 1780
An Act to repeal so much of an Act, made in the Fifteenth Year of His Majesty's Reign (Note: Crown Lands Act 1775 (15 Geo. 3. c. 33)) (for settling Buckingham House upon the Queen, in lieu of Somerset House, and for other Purposes), as enables the Commissioners of His Majesty's Treasury to apply the Sums necessary for completing Somerset House out of the Aids granted for Naval Services, or out of any of the Revenues arising from the Receipt of the several Offices to be erected and established by virtue of the said Act. (Repealed by Statute Law Revision Act 1871 (34 & 35 Vict. c. 116))
Payment of Creditors (Scotland) Act 1780 (repealed)	20 Geo. 3. c. 41	19 June 1780
An Act to continue an Act, made in the Twelfth Year of the Reign of His present Majesty, intituled, "An Act for rendering the Payment of the Creditors of Insolvent Debtors more equal and expeditious; and for regulating the Diligence of the Law by Arrestment and Poinding; and for extending the Privilege of Bills to Promissory Notes, and for limiting Actions upon Bills and Promissory Notes, in that Part of Great Britain called Scotland." (Note: Bills of Exchange (Scotland) Act 1772 (12 Geo. 3. c. 72)) (Repealed by Statute Law Revision Act 1871 (34 & 35 Vict. c. 116))
Isle of Man Act 1780 (repealed)	20 Geo. 3. c. 42	19 June 1780
An Act for granting to His Majesty several additional Duties upon certain Goods imported into the Isle of Man; and for better regulating the Trade, and securing the Revenues of the said Island. (Repealed by Customs Law Repeal Act 1825 (6 Geo. 4. c. 105))
Loans or Exchequer Bills Act 1780 (repealed)	20 Geo. 3. c. 43	19 June 1780
An Act for raising a certain Sum of Money by Loans or Exchequer Bills, for the Service of the Year One thousand seven hundred and eighty. (Repealed by Statute Law Revision Act 1871 (34 & 35 Vict. c. 116))
Militia (No. 2) Act 1780 (repealed)	20 Geo. 3. c. 44	19 June 1780
An Act to explain an Act of the last Session of Parliament, intituled, "An Act for augmenting the Militia;" (Note: Militia Act 1779 (19 Geo. 3. c. 76)) and to declare valid and effectual the swearing in and Enrolment of Militia Men, Substitutes and Volunteers in Cases where all the Provisions of the several Acts now in being relative thereto have not been observed; and to indemnify Deputy Lieutenants, Chief Magistrates and Justices of the Peace, for their Proceedings therein respectively; to declare valid and effectual the Commissions granted by Deputy Lieutenants in the Absence of the Lieutenant of any County out of the Kingdom, to Officers commanding Volunteer Companies; and to indemnify Deputy Lieutenants and Officers who have granted or acted under such Commissions; and to enlarge the Powers of Deputy Lieutenants in certain Cases. (Repealed by Statute Law Revision Act 1861 (24 & 25 Vict. c. 101))
Importation, etc. Act 1780 (repealed)	20 Geo. 3. c. 45	23 June 1780
An Act to permit Goods, the Product or Manufacture of certain Places within the Levant or Mediterranean Seas, to be imported into Great Britain or Ireland, in British or Foreign Vessels, from any Place whatsoever; and for laying a Duty on Cotton and Cotton Wool imported into this Kingdom, in Foreign Ships or Vessels, for a limited Time. (Repealed by Statute Law Revision Act 1871 (34 & 35 Vict. c. 116))
Exportation Act 1780 (repealed)	20 Geo. 3. c. 46	23 June 1780
An Act to allow the Exportation of Provisions, Goods, Wares and Merchandize from Great Britain to certain Towns, Ports or Places in North America, which are or may be under the Protection of His Majesty's Arms, and from such Towns, Ports or Places to Great Britain, and other Parts of His Majesty's Dominions. (Repealed by Statute Law Revision Act 1871 (34 & 35 Vict. c. 116))
Indemnity Act 1780 (repealed)	20 Geo. 3. c. 47	23 June 1780
An Act to indemnify such Persons as have omitted to qualify themselves for Offices and Employments; and to indemnify Justices of the Peace or others, who have omitted to register or deliver in their Qualifications within the Time limited by Law, and for giving further Time for those Purposes; and to indemnify Members and Officers in Cities, Corporations and Borough Towns, whose Admissions have been omitted to be stamped according to Law, or having been stamped have been lost or mislaid, and for allowing them Time to provide Admissions duly stamped; and to give further Time to such Persons as have omitted to make and file Affidavits of the Execution of Indentures of Clerks to Attornies and Solicitors. (Repealed by Promissory Oaths Act 1871 (34 & 35 Vict. c. 48))
Goswell Street, Middlesex Act 1780 (repealed)	20 Geo. 3. c. 48	4 May 1780
An Act for repairing, lighting, watching and cleansing the High Street or Road called Goswell Street, leading from Aldersgate Bars, without Aldersgate, London, to the House of Woodhouse Coker Gentleman, near the Turnpike at the End of the said Street or Road, in the County of Middlesex; and also Bull Yard, Glasshouse Yard, the North Side of Fan's Alley, Mount Mill and Willow Court, contiguous to the said Street or Road, on the East and West Sides thereof; and for removing Nuisances therefrom, and preventing the like for the future. (Repealed by London Government (Borough of Finsbury) Order in Council 1901 (SR&O 1901/266))
Chatham Fortifications Act 1780	20 Geo. 3. c. 49	3 July 1780
An Act to vest certain Messuages, Lands, Tenements and Hereditaments in Trustees, for the better securing His Majesty's Dock, Ships and Stores at Chatham.
Parliament (No. 2) Act 1780 (repealed)	20 Geo. 3. c. 50	23 June 1780
An Act for exempting the City of Winchester, the County of Southampton, the Town of Shrewsbury, and the County of Salop, out of the Provisions of an Act, made in the Eighth Year of the Reign of His late Majesty King George the Second, intituled, "An Act for regulating the Quartering of Soldiers during the Time of the Elections of Members to serve in Parliament," (Note: Parliamentary Elections Act 1734 (8 Geo. 2. c. 30)) so far as the same relates to the Removal of Troops during the Elections of Members to serve in Parliament, for a limited Time. (Repealed by Statute Law Revision Act 1871 (34 & 35 Vict. c. 116))
Taxation Act 1780 (repealed)	20 Geo. 3. c. 51	3 July 1780
An Act for repealing an Act made in the Nineteenth Year of the Reign of His present Majesty, intituled, "An Act for granting to His Majesty certain Duties on Licences to be taken out by all Persons letting Horses to hire for travelling in the Manner therein mentioned, and certain Duties on all Horses let to hire for the Purposes of travelling Post, and by Time, and upon certain Carriages therein mentioned;" (Note: Taxation (No. 2) Act 1779 (19 Geo. 3. c. 51)) and for granting other Duties in lieu thereof. (Repealed by Statute Law Revision Act 1861 (24 & 25 Vict. c. 101))
Taxation (No. 2) Act 1780 (repealed)	20 Geo. 3. c. 52	3 July 1780
An Act for granting to His Majesty additional Duties upon Starch and Hair Powder imported, and upon Starch made in Great Britain, and upon Sweets. (Repealed by Statute Law Revision Act 1861 (24 & 25 Vict. c. 101))
Loans or Exchequer Bills (No. 2) Act 1780 (repealed)	20 Geo. 3. c. 53	3 July 1780
An Act for raising a further Sum of Money by Loans or Exchequer Bills, for the Service of the Year One thousand seven hundred and eighty. (Repealed by Statute Law Revision Act 1871 (34 & 35 Vict. c. 116))
Audit of Public Accounts Act 1780 (repealed)	20 Geo. 3. c. 54	5 July 1780
An Act for appointing and enabling Commissioners to examine, take and state the Publick Accounts of the Kingdom, and to report what Balances are in the Hands of Accountants, which may be applied to the Publick Service; and what Defects there are in the present Mode of receiving, collecting, issuing and accounting for Publick Money; and in what more expeditious and effectual and less expensive Manner the said Services can in future be regulated and carried on for the Benefit of the Public. (Repealed by Statute Law Revision Act 1871 (34 & 35 Vict. c. 116))
Wool Act 1780 (repealed)	20 Geo. 3. c. 55	3 July 1780
An Act to repeal so much of an Act made in the Thirteenth and Fourteenth Years of the Reign of King Charles the Second, (Note: Wool Act 1662 (14 Cha. 2 c. 18)) as restrains the Removal of Wool, and other Articles, to certain Times and Hours therein mentioned. (Repealed by Statute Law Revision Act 1871 (34 & 35 Vict. c. 116))
East India Company (No. 1) Act 1780 (repealed)	20 Geo. 3. c. 56	3 July 1780
An Act for continuing in the Possession of the United Company of Merchants of England trading to the East Indies, for a further Time, and under certain Conditions, the Territorial Acquisitions and Revenues lately obtained in the East Indies; and for reviving and continuing for a further Time, so much of an Act made in the Thirteenth Year of the Reign of His present Majesty, intituled, "An Act for establishing certain Regulations for the better Management of the Affairs of the East India Company, as well in India as in Europe," (Note: East India Company Act 1772 (13 Geo. 3. c. 63)) as hath expired in the Course of the present Year, and for indemnifying the said Company for any Money they have paid or may pay, in or about the Building of Three Ships of the Line, for the Service of the Publick. (Repealed by Statute Law Revision Act 1871 (34 & 35 Vict. c. 116))
Loans or Exchequer Bills (No. 3) Act 1780 (repealed)	20 Geo. 3. c. 57	5 July 1780
An Act for enabling His Majesty to raise the Sum of One Million for the Uses and Purposes therein mentioned. (Repealed by Statute Law Revision Act 1871 (34 & 35 Vict. c. 116))
East India Company (No. 2) Act 1780 (repealed)	20 Geo. 3. c. 58	3 July 1780
An Act for granting further Time for allowing the Drawback on the Exportation of Coffee imported by the East India Company in the Ship Europa, in the Year One thousand seven hundred and seventy-five. (Repealed by Statute Law Revision Act 1871 (34 & 35 Vict. c. 116))
Exportations, etc. Act 1780 (repealed)	20 Geo. 3. c. 59	3 July 1780
An Act to empower His Majesty to prohibit the Exportation, and to restrain the carrying Coastwise of Copper in Bars or Copper in Sheets, for a limited Time. (Repealed by Statute Law Revision Act 1871 (34 & 35 Vict. c. 116))
Fisheries Act 1780 (repealed)	20 Geo. 3. c. 60	3 July 1780
An Act to explain and amend Two Acts made in the Fifteenth (Note: Newfoundland Fisheries Act 1775 (15 Geo. 3. c. 31)) and Sixteenth (Note: Whale Fishery, etc. Act 1776 (16 Geo. 3. c. 47)) Years of the Reign of His present Majesty, with respect to the Limits of the Greenland Seas and Davis's Streights, and the Seas adjacent thereto, and to enlarge the Time for the Return of the Vessels employed in the Whale Fisheries. (Repealed by Statute Law Revision Act 1861 (24 & 25 Vict. c. 101))
Finding of the Longitude at Sea Act 1780 (repealed)	20 Geo. 3. c. 61	3 July 1780
An Act for continuing the Encouragement and Reward of Persons making certain Discoveries for finding the Longitude at Sea, or making other useful Discoveries and Improvements in Navigation, and for making Experiments relating thereto.. (Repealed by Statute Law Revision Act 1871 (34 & 35 Vict. c. 116))
Appropriation Act 1780 (repealed)	20 Geo. 3. c. 62	5 July 1780
An Act for granting to His Majesty a certain Sum of Money out of the Sinking Fund; and for applying certain Monies therein mentioned for the Service of the Year One thousand seven hundred and eighty; and for further appropriating the Supplies granted in this Session of Parliament. (Repealed by Statute Law Revision Act 1871 (34 & 35 Vict. c. 116))
Indemnity, Suppression of Riots Act 1780 (repealed)	20 Geo. 3. c. 63	5 July 1780
An Act to indemnify such Persons as have acted in the Suppression of the late Riots and Tumults in and about the Cities of London and Westminster, and Borough of Southwark; and for the Preservation of the Public Peace. (Repealed by Statute Law Revision Act 1871 (34 & 35 Vict. c. 116))
Release of Prisoners by Rioters Act 1780 (repealed)	20 Geo. 3. c. 64	8 July 1780
An Act to prevent any Mischief or Inconvenience which may arise to Sheriffs, Gaolers, Suitors, Prisoners or others, by the Prisoners in several Gaols in the Counties of Middlesex and Surrey, and the City of London, having been set at Liberty during the late Tumults and Insurrections. (Repealed by Statute Law Revision Act 1871 (34 & 35 Vict. c. 116))
West Riding (Small Debts) Act 1780 (repealed)	20 Geo. 3. c. 65	3 July 1780
An Act to repeal so much of an Act made in the Seventeenth Year of His present Majesty's Reign, (Note: Yorkshire (Small Debts) Act 1776 (17 Geo. 3. c. 15)) as relates to the more easy and speedy Recovery of Small Debts within the Parishes of Halifax, Bradford, Kighley, Bingley, Guiseley, Calverley, Batley, Birstal, Mirfield, Hartishead cum Clifton, Almondbury, Kirkheaton, Kirkburton and Huddersfield, and the Lordship or Liberty of Tong, in the West Riding of the County of York; and for granting other Powers for those Purposes; and for extending the Jurisdiction of the Court Baron of the Manor of Kighley, in the said County. (Repealed by West Riding Small Debts Act 1793 (33 Geo. 3. c. 84))
Stepney (Poor Relief, etc.) Act 1780 (repealed)	20 Geo. 3. c. 66	19 June 1780
An Act for the better Relief and Employment of the Poor of the Hamlet of Mile End New Town, in the Parish of Stepney, in the County of Middlesex; for paving, cleansing, lighting and watching the Streets and other Open Passages and Places within the said Hamlet, and removing Nuisances and Annoyances therefrom, and for preventing the like for the future; for consolidating the Highway Rates with other Rates within the said Hamlet; and for paving and regulating Great Garden Street, in the Parish of Saint Mary Matfellon otherwise Whitechapel, in the said County, and removing a Bar now standing across the same, and other Nuisances and Annoyances therefrom, and preventing the like for the future. (Repealed by Mile End New Town Poor Relief Act 1813 (53 Geo. 3. c. xxxvii) and London Government (Borough of Stepney) Order in Council 1901 (SR&O 1901/276))
Banbury Road Act 1780 (repealed)	20 Geo. 3. c. 67	24 February 1780
An Act for enlarging the Term and Powers of an Act, made in the Twenty-sixth Year of the Reign of His late Majesty, intituled, "An Act to widen and repair the Road from the Guide Post near the End of Drayton Lane, near Banbury, in the County of Oxford, to the House called The Sun Rising, at the Top of Edgehill, in the County of Warwick." (Note: Drayton and Edgehill Road Act 1753 (26 Geo. 2. c. 78)) (Repealed by Road from Banbury to Edgehill Act 1822 (3 Geo. 4. c. xc))
Hockliffe, Woburn and Newport Pagnell Roads Act 1780 (repealed)	20 Geo. 3. c. 68	24 February 1780
An Act for enlarging the Term and Powers granted by Two Acts, made in the First (Note: Hockliffe, Woburn and Newport Pagnell Roads Act 1727 (1 Geo. 2. St. 2. c. 10)) and Sixteenth (Note: Hockliffe, Woburn and Newport Pagnell Roads Act 1742 (16 Geo. 2. c. 4)) Years of the Reign of His late Majesty King George the Second, for the more effectual amending the Highway between Hockliffe and Woburn, in the County of Bedford; and for repairing the Road leading through Woburn to Tickford Bridge in Newport Pagnell, in the County of Bucks. (Repealed by Hockliffe, Woburn and Newport Pagnell Roads Act 1821 (1 & 2 Geo. 4. c. lxxxv))
Warwick and Oxford Roads Act 1780 (repealed)	20 Geo. 3. c. 69	24 February 1780
An Act for continuing the Term, and altering and enlarging the Powers of an Act, passed in the Twenty-eighth Year of the Reign of His late Majesty King George the Second, (Note: Warwick and Oxford Roads Act 1755 (28 Geo. 2. c. 46)) for repairing and widening the Roads leading from the Cross of Hand, near Finford Bridge, in the County of Warwick, through the Town of Southam in the same County, to the Borough of Banbury, in the County of Oxford, and from the Guide Post in the Village of Adderbury, in the same County, through Kidlington, to the Mile Way leading towards the City of Oxford; and also the Road leading from a Place called The Two Mile Tree near the City of Oxford, over Gosford otherwise Gossard Bridge, to a certain Gate entering upon Weston on the Green, in the said County, so far as the same relates to the Road leading from the Cross of Hand near Finford Bridge, in the County of Warwick, through the Town of Southam, in the same County, to the Borough of Banbury, in the County of Oxford. (Repealed by Road from Finford Bridge to Banbury Act 1822 (3 Geo. 4. c. xcv))
Gloucester Roads Act 1780 (repealed)	20 Geo. 3. c. 70	21 March 1780
An Act to enlarge the Term and Powers of an Act, passed in the Thirty-first Year of the Reign of His late Majesty, (Note: Gloucestershire Roads (No. 3) Act 1757 (31 Geo. 2. c. 65)) for repairing and widening the Roads from Tetbury to the Gates on the West of Simond's Hall Down, and other Roads in the said Act mentioned, so far as the same relates to the Road from the Market House in Tetbury, to the Turnpike Road on Minchinhampton Common; and from the said Road in Minchinhampton Field, unto the Turnpike Road from Cirencester to Stroud near Burnt Ash; and from the said Turnpike Road to Tayloe's Mill Pond, in Chalford Bottom; and through Hide to the Bottom of the Bourn Hill, in the County of Gloucester. (Repealed by Tetbury Roads Act 1822 (3 Geo. 4. c. lxiii), Annual Turnpike Acts Continuance Act 1877 (40 & 41 Vict. c. 64) and Statute Law (Repeals) Act 2013 (c. 2))
Warwick and Worcester Roads Act 1780 (repealed)	20 Geo. 3. c. 71	21 March 1780
An Act for more effectually repairing the Roads from Warwick to Paddle Brook, and from Warwick to Stratford upon Avon, in the Counties of Warwick and Worcester; and for repealing the Laws now in Force relating to the said Roads. (Repealed by Warwick and Paddle Brook and Stratford-upon-Avon Roads Act 1827 (7 & 8 Geo. 4. c. xxvi))
Mansfield and Chesterfield Road Act 1780 (repealed)	20 Geo. 3. c. 72	21 March 1780
An Act for enlarging the Term and Powers of an Act, made in the Thirty-second Year of the Reign of His Majesty King George the Second, intituled, "An Act for repairing and widening the High Road leading from the Town of Mansfield, in the County of Nottingham, through the Towns of Pleasley, Glapwell, Heath and Normenton, and the Liberty of Hasland, to the Turnpike Road leading from the Town of Derby to the Town of Chesterfield, in the County of Derby." (Note: Mansfield and Chesterfield Road Act 1758 (32 Geo. 2. c. 37)) (Repealed by Mansfield and Chesterfield Road Act 1815 (55 Geo. 3. c. xvi) and Annual Turnpike Acts Continuance Act 1876 (39 & 40 Vict. c. 39))
Lincoln and Nottinghamshire Roads Act 1780 (repealed)	20 Geo. 3. c. 73	21 March 1780
An Act for enlarging the Term and Powers of so much of an Act made in the Thirty-second Year of the Reign of His late Majesty King George the Second, intituled, "An Act for repairing and widening the Roads from Grantham, in the County of Lincoln, through Bottesford and Bingham, to Nottingham Trent Bridge; and from Chappel Bar, near the West End of the Town of Nottingham, to Saint Mary's Bridge, in the Town of Derby; and from the Guide Post in the Parish of Lenton, to Sawley Ferry," (Note: Lincoln and Nottingham Roads Act 1758 (32 Geo. 2. c. 53)) as relates to the Road leading from Chappel Bar near the West End of the Town of Nottingham, to Saint Mary's Bridge, in the Town of Derby, and from the Guide Post in the Parish of Lenton to Sawley Ferry. (Repealed by Nottingham and Derby, and Lenton and Sawley Ferry Roads Act 1827 (7 & 8 Geo. 4. c. xxvii))
Derby and Nottinghamshire Roads Act 1780 (repealed)	20 Geo. 3. c. 74	21 March 1780
An Act for enlarging the Term and Powers of an Act, made in the Thirty-second Year of the Reign of His Majesty King George the Second, intituled, "An Act for repairing and widening the Roads from Chappel Bar near the West End of the Town of Nottingham to New Haven, and from the four Lane Ends near Oakerthorpe, to Ashborne, and from the Cross Post on Wirksworth Moor, to join the Road leading from Chesterfield to Chapel-en-le-Frith, at or near Longston, in the County of Derby, and from Selston to Annesley Woodhouse, in the County of Nottingham." (Note: Notts and Derby Roads Act 1758 (32 Geo. 2. c. 38)) (Repealed by Nottingham and Derby Road Act 1799 (39 Geo. 3. c. xii) and Nottingham and Newhaven Turnpike Road Act 1855 (18 & 19 Vict. c. xcii))
Lincoln Roads Act 1780 (repealed)	20 Geo. 3. c. 75	21 March 1780
An Act to enlarge the Term and Power of an Act, passed in the Thirty-second Year of the Reign of His late Majesty King George the Second, (Note: Lincoln Roads Act 1758 (32 Geo. 2. c. 44)) intituled, "An Act to continue, amend and make effectual, an Act passed in the Twelfth Year of the Reign of His present Majesty, (Note: Lincoln (City) Roads Act 1738 (12 Geo. 2. c. 10)) intituled, 'An Act for repairing the Roads from the North West Parts of the County of Lincoln through Nettlam Fields, Wragby Lane and Baumber Fields, to the Wolds or North East Part of the said County;' and also for repairing and widening the Roads from the Well in East Gate in the City of Lincoln, and from the North West End of Horncastle, and from the Guide Post at the East End of Hainton, through Barkwith, to the Roads directed to be repaired by the said Act." (Repealed by Roads in Lincoln Act 1806 (46 Geo. 3. c. lxx))
Burford to Preston Road Act 1780 (repealed)	20 Geo. 3. c. 76	21 March 1780
An Act to enlarge the Term and Powers of an Act, passed in the Twenty-sixth Year of the Reign of His late Majesty, intituled, "An Act for repairing and widening the Road from the Hand and Post in Upton Field, in the Parish of Burford, in the County of Oxford, through the several Parishes within mentioned, to a Place in the Parish of Preston, in the County of Gloucester, called Dancy's Fancy." (Note: Oxford and Gloucester Roads Act 1753 (26 Geo. 2. c. 70)) (Repealed by Burford and Dancy's Fancy Road Act 1822 (3 Geo. 4. c. xlvii), Annual Turnpike Acts Continuance Act 1867 (30 & 31 Vict. c. 121) and Statute Law (Repeals) Act 2013 (c. 2))
Southampton Roads Act 1780 (repealed)	20 Geo. 3. c. 77	21 March 1780
An Act for repairing and widening the Roads from Gosport, in the County of Southampton, through Fareham and Wickham, to the Town of Bishop's Waltham; and from Wickham aforesaid, through Droxford, Exton, Warnford, Westmoon and Rumsdean Bottom to Chawton Pond, in the Parish of Chawton, in the said County. (Repealed by Gosport and Bishop's Waltham, and Wickham and Chawton Road Act 1828 (9 Geo. 4. c. xlix))
Highgate and Hampstead Roads Act 1780 (repealed)	20 Geo. 3. c. 78	21 March 1780
An Act to explain and amend so much of an Act, passed in the Sixteenth Year of His present Majesty's Reign, (Note: Highgate and Hampstead Roads Act 1776 (16 Geo. 3. c. 76)) to continue and render more effectual several Acts of Parliament for repairing the Highways leading to Highgate Gatehouse and Hampstead, and for several other Purposes in the said first-mentioned Act contained, as gives Power to erect or remove Turnpikes or Toll-Gates, so far as relates to erecting or continuing any Turnpike or Toll-Gate in Gray's Inn Lane, or between the said Lane and the New Road leading from Islington to Paddington. (Repealed by Roads to Highgate House and Hampstead Act 1821 (1 & 2 Geo. 4. c. cx))
Devon Roads Act 1780 (repealed)	20 Geo. 3. c. 79	21 March 1780
An Act for more effectually repairing the Road leading from the End of the Exeter Turnpike Road on the West Side of Lord Clifford's Park Gate to Biddaford, and also several Roads leading from Bridgetown Pomeroy, and from Teign Bridge, in the County of Devon; and for repealing Two Acts, of the Thirty-second of His late Majesty, (Note: Devon Roads Act 1758 (32 Geo. 2. c. 52)) and the Second of His present Majesty, (Note: Devon Roads (No. 2) Act 1762 (2 Geo. 3. c. 64)) made for repairing the said Roads. (Repealed by Road from the end of the Exeter Turnpike Road, and Totnes Bridge Act 1824 (5 Geo. 4. c. xii))
Birmingham to Edgehill Road Act 1780 (repealed)	20 Geo. 3. c. 80	21 March 1780
An Act to continue, enlarge and render more effectual, the Term and Powers in Three several Acts, made in the Twelfth Year of the Reign of King George the First, (Note: Birmingham to Edgehill Road Act 1725 (12 Geo. 1. c. 6)) and in the Eighteenth (Note: Birmingham to Edgehill Road Act 1744 (18 Geo. 2. c. 32)) and Thirty-first (Note: Birmingham to Edgehill Road Act 1757 (31 Geo. 2. c. 58)) Years of the Reign of His late Majesty, for repairing the Roads from Birmingham through Warwick, to Warmington, and from Birmingham through Stratford upon Avon to Edgehill, in the County of Warwick, so far as the same relate to the Road from Birmingham through Warwick to Warmington aforesaid, and so on to the utmost Limits of the said County on Edgehill aforesaid. (Repealed by Birmingham and Edgehill Road Act 1830 (11 Geo. 4 & 1 Will. 4. c. xciv))
Bridgeford Lane, Nottinghamshire to Kettering Road Act 1780 (repealed)	20 Geo. 3. c. 81	21 March 1780
An Act to enlarge the Term and Powers of an Act, passed in the Twenty-seventh Year of the Reign of His late Majesty King George the Second, (Note: Bridgeford Lane, Nottinghamshire to Kettering Road Act 1754 (27 Geo. 2. c. 39)) for repairing and widening the Road from the North End of Bridgeford Lane, in the County of Nottingham, to and through several Towns and Places in the Counties of Nottingham, Leicester and Rutland, and through Rockingham, to the Bowling Green at Kettering, in the County of Northampton. (Repealed by Road from Bridgford to Kettering Act 1801 (41 Geo. 3 (U.K.) c. cxvii))
Wiltshire Roads Act 1780 (repealed)	20 Geo. 3. c. 82	21 March 1780
An Act for enlarging the Term and Powers of Two Acts of the First (Note: Wilts Roads Act 1760 (1 Geo. 3. c. 37)) and Second (Note: Wilts Roads (No. 2) Act 1762 (2 Geo. 3. c. 51)) Years of His present Majesty, for amending, widening and keeping in Repair, the Road leading from Fisherton Bridge (Note: Fisherton Bridge, carrying Fisherton Street across the River Avon, Salisbury, Wiltshire. 51°04′08″N 1°47′54″W) to the Turnpike Road at Willoughby Hedge, (Note: Willoughby Hedge is at the junction of the A303 and B3089 roads, north of West Knoyle, Wiltshire. 51°06′04″N 2°11′15″W) in West Knoyle; and from Wilton Bridge (Note: Burden's Ball Bridge, Wilton, Wiltshire. 51°04′59″N 1°51′36″W) to the Turnpike Road at the West End of Heytesbury; (Note: The junction of the A36 and B390 roads west of Heytesbury, Wiltshire. 51°10′52″N 2°05′37″W) and also the Road from the Turnpike Road at the Top of Red Hone Hill, (Note: Redhorn Hill, south of Urchfont, Wiltshire. 51°18′09″N 1°54′59″W) in the Parish of Urshfont, to the Mile Stone at the Western End of Fisherton Street, (Note: Junction of Fisherton Street, Devizes Street and Wilton Street, Salisbury, Wiltshire. 51°04′19″N 1°48′18″W) in the County of Wilts. (Repealed by Roads from Fisherton, Wilton and Heytesbury Act 1815 (55 Geo. 3. c. lxii) and Annual Turnpike Acts Continuance Act 1869 (32 & 33 Vict. c. 90))
Sussex Roads Act 1780 (repealed)	20 Geo. 3. c. 83	21 March 1780
An Act to continue the Term and enlarge the Powers of an Act, made in the Thirty-second Year of the Reign of His late Majesty King George the Second, (Note: Lewes and Eastbourne Road Act 1758 (32 Geo. 2. c. 67)) for repairing the Road from the South End of the South Street, in the Parish of South Malling, near the Town of Lewes, to Glyndbridge; and from thence through Firle Street under the Hill to Longbridge, in the Parish of Alfriston, in the County of Sussex. (Repealed by Lewes and Eastbourne, and Polegate and Hailsham Roads Act 1819 (59 Geo. 3. c. x))
Gloucester Roads (No. 2) Act 1780 (repealed)	20 Geo. 3. c. 84	21 March 1780
An Act for making and maintaining a Road from Tiltup's Inn, in the Parish of Horsley, to join the Turnpike Road leading from Cirencester to Dudbridge, at or near Dudbridge, in the Parish of Rodborough; and from the Bridge at Nailsworth, in the Parish of Avening to Minchinhampton Common; and several other Roads therein mentioned, all in the County of Gloucester. (Repealed by Gloucestershire Roads Act 1822 (3 Geo. 4. c. lxi))
Somerset Roads Act 1780	20 Geo. 3. c. 85	21 March 1780
An Act for enlarging the Term and Powers of Two Acts, of the Twenty-sixth of His late Majesty, (Note: Somerset Roads (No. 2) Act 1753 (26 Geo. 2. c. 71)) and the Fifth of His present Majesty, (Note: Somerset Roads Act 1765 (5 Geo. 3. c. 104)) for repairing several Roads therein mentioned, leading to and from the Town of Shepton Mallet, in the County of Somerset; and for repairing the Road from Steen Bow Bridge, to the Turnpike Road leading from Glastonbury to Piper's Inn, and from Chilkwell to Glastonbury, and from Shepton Mallet to a Place called The White Post, in the Turnpike Road leading from Bath to Wells, in the said County.
Yorkshire Roads Act 1780 (repealed)	20 Geo. 3. c. 86	21 March 1780
An Act for reviving and continuing the Term, and varying some of the Powers of an Act, made in the Twenty-ninth Year of the Reign of His late Majesty King George the Second, intituled, "An Act for repairing and widening the High Road from the Borough of Ripon by Ingram Bank, to the Town of Pateley Bridge, in the County of York;" (Note: Ripon and Pateley Bridge Road Act 1756 (29 Geo. 2. c. 83)) and for making Compensation to the Trustees and Mortgagees, under Two Acts made in the Thirty-second Year of His late Majesty King George the Second, (Note: Wetherby to Grassington Road Act 1758 (32 Geo. 2. c. 71)) and in the Fourteenth Year of His present Majesty, (Note: Wetherby to Grassington Road Act 1774 (14 Geo. 3. c. 98)) for repairing and widening the High Road from Wetherby to Grassington, in the County of York. (Repealed by Ripon and Pateley Bridge Road Act 1821 (1 & 2 Geo. 4. c. xi), Road from Knaresborough to Ripon and Pateley Bridge Act 1826 (7 Geo. 4. c. xiv) and Annual Turnpike Acts Continuance Act 1871 (34 & 35 Vict. c. 115))
Trent Bridge to Cotes Bridge Road Act 1780 (repealed)	20 Geo. 3. c. 87	21 March 1780
An Act for repealing Two Acts, made in the Eleventh (Note: Nottinghamshire and Leicester Roads Act 1737 (11 Geo. 2. c. 3)) and Twenty-seventh (Note: Nottinghamshire and Leicester Roads Act 1754 (27 Geo. 2. c. 22)) Years of the Reign of King George the Second, for repairing the Road from the Trent Bridge, (Note: Trent Bridge in Nottingham. 52°56′18″N 1°08′11″W) in the County of the Town of Nottingham, through Costock otherwise Cortlingstock Lane, (Note: Costock in Nottinghamshire. 52°49′55″N 1°08′43″W) to Cotes Bridge, (Note: Cotes Bridge takes the A60 across the River Soar near Cotes in Leicestershire. 52°46′49″N 1°10′49″W) in the County of Leicester; and for making more effectual Provision for the Repair of the said Road. (Repealed by Road from Trent Bridge to Cotes Bridge Act 1824 (5 Geo. 4. c. xlvi))
Westmorland Roads Act 1780 (repealed)	20 Geo. 3. c. 88	21 March 1780
An Act for enlarging the Term and Powers of an Act, made in the Thirty-second Year of the Reign of His Majesty King George the Second, intituled, "An Act for repairing, amending and widening the Roads from the South West End of Netherbridge, (Note: Nether Bridge, Kendal, Cumbria, where the A6 road meets the A65 road. 54°19′15″N 2°44′42″W) in the County of Westmorland, by Sizerghfellside (Note: Sizergh Fell, Cumbria.) to Leven's Bridge, (Note: Levens Bridge, which takes the A6 road across the River Kent, north of Levens Hall, Cumbria. 54°15′37″N 2°46′30″W) and from thence through the Town of Millthrop (Note: Milnthorpe, Cumbria.) to Dixes; and from the Town of Millthrop aforesaid to Hangbridge, (Note: Hang Bridge, on the B6384 road between Milnthorpe and Holme, Cumbria. 54°12′53″N 2°44′59″W) and from thence to join the Heron Syke Turnpike Road, at the Guide Post near Clawthrop Hall, (Note: A former junction on the A6070 road north of Clawthorpe Hall, Clawthorpe, Cumbria. The former road from Milnthorpe was removed when the M6 motorway was built. 54°11′38″N 2°43′21″W) in the County aforesaid." (Note: Westmorland Roads Act 1758 (32 Geo. 2. c. 69)) (Repealed by Road from Nether Bridge and from Millthrop (Westmorland) Act 1822 (3 Geo. 4. c. xii))
Sacred Gate and Patrington Creek Road Act 1780 (repealed)	20 Geo. 3. c. 89	21 March 1780
An Act to enlarge the Term and Powers of an Act, made in the First Year of the Reign of His present Majesty, intituled, "An Act for amending the Road from Sacred Gate in the Parish of Thorngumbald to Pattrington Creek or Haven, and from the Guide Post in Winestead to Frodingham Gate, in or near Widow Branton's Farm, in the County of York; and for scouring and cleansing the said Creek or Haven." (Note: Sacred Gate and Patrington Creek Road Act 1760 (1 Geo. 3. c. 35)) (Repealed by Road from Sacred Gate to Patrington Creek (Yorkshire) Act 1824 (5 Geo. 4. c. lxxxvi) (Note: Incorrectly cited as "5 Geo. 4. c. lxxvi" in the Chronological Table of the Statutes.))
Stockbridge and Winchester Roads Act 1780 (repealed)	20 Geo. 3. c. 90	4 May 1780
An Act to continue the Term, and alter and enlarge the Powers of an Act, made in the Thirty-first Year of the Reign of His late Majesty King George the Second, (Note: Stockbridge and Winchester Roads Act 1757 (31 Geo. 2. c. 75)) for repairing and widening the Roads from the Town of Stockbridge, in the County of Southampton, to the City of Winchester; and from the said City, through Bellmour Lane, to the Top of Stephen's Castle Down, near the Town of Bishop's Waltham, in the said County; and from the said City of Winchester, through Otterborne, to Bargate, in the Town, and County of the Town of Southampton. (Repealed by Stockbridge, Winchester and Southampton Roads Act 1823 (4 Geo. 4. c. xv))
Macclesfield to Buxton Road Act 1780 (repealed)	20 Geo. 3. c. 91	4 May 1780
An Act to enlarge the Term and Powers of an Act, passed in the Thirty-second Year of King George the Second, (Note: Macclesfield and Buxton Road Act 1758 (32 Geo. 3. c. 41)) for repairing and widening the Road from the Cross at Brokencross in Macclesfield, in the County of Chester, to the Turnpike Road at Buxton, in the County of Derby; and for making and keeping in Repair certain Branches of Road, to communicate with the said Macclesfield Road. (Repealed by Road from Macclesfield to the Buxton Turnpike Road Act 1821 (1 & 2 Geo. 4. c. xxxvi))
Hamptonshire and Dorset Roads Act 1780	20 Geo. 3. c. 92	4 May 1780
An Act to enlarge the Term and Powers of Two Acts, one made in the Thirty-second Year of the Reign of His late Majesty, (Note: Dorset Roads Act 1758 (32 Geo. 2. c. 50)) for repairing and widening several Roads therein mentioned, in the Counties of Southampton and Dorset, and the other made in the Second Year of the Reign of His present Majesty, (Note: Hants and Dorset Roads Act 1762 (2 Geo. 3. c. 57)) to amend the said former Act; and for amending and widening the Road between Ringwood Gate, in the County of Southampton, to Woolsbridge, and from thence to the Great Western Road, between a Place called Thickthorn and Cashmore Inn, so far as the said Two Acts relate to the Fifth Division of Road directed to be repaired and widened by the said last mentioned Act.
Gloucester Roads (No. 3) Act 1780 (repealed)	20 Geo. 3. c. 93	4 May 1780
An Act for enlarging the Term and Powers of an Act, passed in the Thirty-first Year of the Reign of His late Majesty King George the Second, (Note: Gloucestershire Roads (No. 3) Act 1757 (31 Geo. 2. c. 65)) for repairing and widening several Roads from Tetbury, and other Places in the County of Gloucester, so far as the same relates to the Road from Tetbury to the Gates on the West of Symond's Hall Down, and from the House at the Top of Frocester Hill, where the Turnpike Gate lately stood, to the Turnpike Road from Cirencester towards Bath; and from the Field called Bouldown Sleight to the End of a Lane adjoining to the Road from Horsley to Tetbury, near Tiltup's Inn; and for amending and keeping in Repair the Road from the said Turnpike Road, near Howell's Down, across Owlpen Down, to a Lane leading to Lampern Hill; and from another Part of the said Turnpike Road, near the Latterwood Turnpike, across Owlpen Down aforesaid, all in the said County of Gloucester. (Repealed by Roads from Tetbury, Frocester Hill and from Latterwood Act 1821 (1 & 2 Geo. 4. c. lxxxiii))
Louth Roads Act 1780 (repealed)	20 Geo. 3. c. 94	4 May 1780
An Act for enlarging the Term and Powers of an Act, made in the Tenth Year of the Reign of His present Majesty, intituled, "An Act for repairing and widening several Roads leading from the Town of Louth, in the County of Lincoln." (Note: Louth Roads Act 1770 (10 Geo. 3. c. 109)) (Repealed by Roads from Saltfleet to Lincoln Act 1830 (11 Geo. 4 & 1 Will. 4. c. ciii))
Melton Mowbray to Grantham Road Act 1780 (repealed)	20 Geo. 3. c. 95	4 May 1780
An Act for making and maintaining a Road from Sage Cross, in the Town of Melton Mowbray, in the County of Leicester, to the Town of Grantham, in the County of Lincoln. (Repealed by Melton Mowbray and Grantham Road Act 1823 (4 Geo. 4. c. l))
Guildford to Farnham Road Act 1780 (repealed)	20 Geo. 3. c. 96	4 May 1780
An Act for enlarging the Term and Powers of an Act, made in the Thirty-first Year of the Reign of His Majesty King George the Second, intituled, "An Act for repairing and widening the Road from the Town of Guldeford to the directing Post near the Town of Farnham, in the County of Surrey." (Note: Guildford to Farnham Road Act 1757 (31 Geo. 2. c. 78)) (Repealed by Guildford to Farnham Road Act 1822 (3 Geo. 4. c. lxvii), Annual Turnpike Acts Continuance Act 1876 (39 & 40 Vict. c. 39) and Statute Law (Repeals) Act 2013 (c. 2))
Denbigh Flint and Carnarvon Roads Act 1780 (repealed)	20 Geo. 3. c. 97	4 May 1780
An Act for continuing the Term and Powers of so much of an Act, made in the Thirty-second Year of the Reign of His late Majesty, (Note: Denbigh, Flint and Carnarvon Roads Act 1758 (32 Geo. 2. c. 55)) for repairing the Roads from Mold to Denbigh, and from thence to Tal-y-Cafn and Conway, and from Wrexham to Ruthin, Denbigh and Rhyddlan, in the Counties of Denbigh, Flint and Carnarvon, as relates to the Road from Wrexham to Denbigh. (Repealed by Wrexham to Denbigh and Ruthin to Cerniogemawr Roads Act 1822 (3 Geo. 4. c. xliii) and Annual Turnpike Acts Continuance Act 1872 (35 & 36 Vict. c. 85))
Wiltshire Roads (No. 2) Act 1780 (repealed)	20 Geo. 3. c. 98	4 May 1780
An Act for amending the Road from the West End of Seend Street to the Horse and Jockey, in the Parish of Box, in the County of Wilts, and certain other Roads leading out of the said Road; and for making an additional Road from the said Road in the Chapelry of Seend, to communicate with the Devizes Turnpike Road at or near Somerham Brook, in the same Chapelry, all in the said County. (Repealed by Somerham Brook and Box (Wiltshire) Road Act 1823 (4 Geo. 4. c. xxix))
Sunning to Egham Road Act 1780 (repealed)	20 Geo. 3. c. 99	4 May 1780
An Act to enlarge the Term and Powers of an Act, passed in the Thirty-second Year of King George the Second, (Note: Windsor Forest Road Act 1758 (32 Geo. 2. c. 46)) for repairing and widening the Road from a Place called The Old Gallows, in the Parish of Sunning, in the County of Berks, through Workingham, New Bracknowl and Sunning Hill, to Virginia Water, in the Parish of Egham, in the County of Surrey. (Repealed by Sonning and Egham Road Act 1822 (3 Geo. 4. c. lxxxviii))
Surrey Roads Act 1780 (repealed)	20 Geo. 3. c. 100	26 May 1780
An Act for enlarging the Term and Powers of an Act, made in the Twenty-eighth Year of the Reign of His late Majesty King George the Second, intituled, "An Act for amending, widening and keeping in Repair, the Roads from Epsom through Ewell, to Tooting, and from Ewell to Kingston upon Thames and Thames Ditton, in the County of Surrey;" (Note: Surrey Roads Act 1755 (28 Geo. 2. c. 57)) and for amending, widening and keeping in Repair, the Road from the Turnpike Road at Ewell, across Ewell Common Fields, to the Ryegate Turnpike Road on Borough Heath, in the said County. (Repealed by Road from Epsom to Tooting Act 1839 (2 & 3 Vict. c. iv))

=== Private acts ===
Short title	Citation	Royal assent
Long title
Scarrington and Aslacton (Nottinghamshire) Inclosure Act 1780	20 Geo. 3. c. 1 Pr.	23 December 1779
An Act for dividing and enclosing the Open fields, Meadows, Common Pastures and Waste Grounds, in the Townships of Scarrington and Aslacton, in the County of Nottingham.
Stonesby Inclosure Act 1780	20 Geo. 3. c. 2 Pr.	23 December 1779
An Act for dividing and enclosing the Open and Common Fields, Common Meadows, Common Pastures and other Commonable Lands, in Stonesby, in the County of Leicester.
Ruck's Estate Act 1780	20 Geo. 3. c. 3 Pr.	24 February 1780
An Act to enable Mary Ruck, Spinster, notwithstanding her Minority, to convey, assign and settle her Real and Personal Estate on her intended Marriage with Benjamin Keene Esquire.
Leckford Inclosure Act 1780	20 Geo. 3. c. 4 Pr.	24 February 1780
An Act for dividing and enclosing the Open Common Fields, Common Downs, Common Meadows, Common Pastures, Waste Lands and Commonable Places, within the Parish of Leckford Abbotts and Abbess, in the County of Southampton.
Bourne's Name Act 1780	20 Geo. 3. c. 5 Pr.	24 February 1780
An Act to enable Richard Bourne Esquire, his first and other Sons, and their Issue Male, and his and their respective Children, to assume and use the Name and bear the Arms of Charlett, pursuant to the Will of Arthur Charlett Esquire, deceased.
Sontag's Naturalization Act 1780	20 Geo. 3. c. 6 Pr.	24 February 1780
An Act for naturalizing John Salomon Balthasar Sontag.
Barham Inclosure Act 1780	20 Geo. 3. c. 7 Pr.	21 March 1780
An Act for enclosing the Open and Common Fields, Meadows, Commonable Lands and Commons, within the Parish and Liberties of Barham, in the County of Huntingdon.
Staveley Inclosure Act 1780	20 Geo. 3. c. 8 Pr.	21 March 1780
An Act for dividing and enclosing the several Commons and Waste Grounds, within the Manor and Parish of Staveley, in the County of Derby.
Heacham Inclosure Act 1780	20 Geo. 3. c. 9 Pr.	21 March 1780
An Act for dividing, allotting and enclosing the Lands and Grounds called Whole Year Lands, Half Year Enclosures, Open Field Lands, Brecks, Commons and Wastes, within the Parish of Heacham, in the County of Norfolk.
Tottenhill with West Briggs (Norfolk) Inclosure Act 1780	20 Geo. 3. c. 10 Pr.	21 March 1780
An Act for dividing, allotting and enclosing the Lands and Grounds called Whole Year Lands, Half Year Enclosures, Open Field Lands, Shack Meadows, and also certain Commons, Severals and Wastes, within the Parish of Tottenhill with West Briggs, in the County of Norfolk.
Legburn Inclosure Act 1780	20 Geo. 3. c. 11 Pr.	21 March 1780
An Act for dividing and enclosing certain Open Fields, Lands and Grounds, in the Parish of Legburn, in the County of Lincoln.
Kighley, Thwaites, and Newsholme (Yorkshire) Inclosures Act 1780	20 Geo. 3. c. 12 Pr.	21 March 1780
An Act for dividing and enclosing the several Open Fields, Arable Lands, Meadows, Commons and Waste Grounds, within the Manors of Kighley, Thwaites and Newsholme, in the Parish of Kighley and County of York.
Matlock Inclosure Act 1780	20 Geo. 3. c. 13 Pr.	21 March 1780
An Act for dividing and enclosing the several Commons and Waste Grounds, within the Manor of Matlock, in the County of Derby.
Charlton Inclosure Act 1780	20 Geo. 3. c. 14 Pr.	21 March 1780
An Act for dividing and allotting the Open Common Fields, Common Downs, Common Meadows, Common Pastures, Waste Lands and Commonable Places, in the Parish of Charlton, in the County of Wilts.
Heaton Inclosure Act 1780	20 Geo. 3. c. 15 Pr.	21 March 1780
An Act for dividing and enclosing all and every the Commons, Moors and Waste Grounds, within the Township of Heaton, in the Parish of Bradford, in the West Riding of the County of York.
Salperton Inclosure Act 1780	20 Geo. 3. c. 16 Pr.	21 March 1780
An Act for dividing, allotting and exchanging the Lands in the Common Fields and Common Pastures, and other Lands, within the Manor and Parish of Salperton, in the County of Gloucester.
Naturalization of Cazenove and Duval Act 1780	20 Geo. 3. c. 17 Pr.	21 March 1780
An Act for naturalizing Charles Henry Cazenove and David Duval.
Huber's Naturalization Act 1780	20 Geo. 3. c. 18 Pr.	21 March 1780
An Act for naturalizing Bartholomew Huber.
Effecting an exchange of lands between Sir James Peachy and other trustees for an almshouse in Petworth (Sussex) and George Obrien Earl of Egremont.	20 Geo. 3. c. 19 Pr.	4 May 1780
An Act to effect an Exchange between Sir James Peachy Baronet and others, Trustees of an Alms-house or House of Charity at Petworth, in the County of Sussex, and George Obrien Earl of Egremont, of certain Lands and Tenements belonging to the said Charity, for other Lands and Tenements belonging to the said Earl of Egremont.
Establishing and confirming an agreement for an exchange of estates in Norfolk between the Bishop of Norwich and Robert Fellows.	20 Geo. 3. c. 20 Pr.	4 May 1780
An Act for establishing and confirming an Agreement made between the Lord Bishop of Norwich and Robert Fellowes Esquire, for the Exchange of certain Estates in the County of Norfolk.
Sale to Samuel Bosanquet of lands and buildings in Layton or Low Layton (Essex), devised by John Smith's will for benefit of the poor of St Swithin and St Peter in Eastgate parishes in Lincoln and purchase and settling other lands to the benefit of the poor.	20 Geo. 3. c. 21 Pr.	4 May 1780
An Act for vesting absolutely One third Part of Three Crosts of Land, and the Erections and Buildings thereon, with the Appurtenances, in the Parish of Layton, otherwise Low Layton, in the County of Essex (devised by the Will of John Smith deceased, for the Benefit of the Poor of the Parishes of Saint Swithin and Saint Peter in Eastgate, in the City of Lincoln) in Trustees, to be sold to Samuel Bosanquet Esquire; and for laying out the Money thereby arising, in the Purchase of other Estates, to be settled and assured for the Benefit of the Poor aforesaid, pursuant to the Directions of the said Will.
Norris' Estate Act 1780	20 Geo. 3. c. 22 Pr.	4 May 1780
An Act for vesting Part of the Freehold Estates, late of John Norris Esquire, deceased, in Trustees, for raising Money to discharge the Legacies given by his Will, and the Codicils thereto remaining unsatisfied; and for other Purposes.
Swinford Inclosure Act 1780	20 Geo. 3. c. 23 Pr.	4 May 1780
An Act for dividing and enclosing the Open and Common Fields, Common Meadows, Common Pastures and other Commonable Grounds, within the Manor and Parish of Swinford, in the County of Leicester.
East Farndon Inclosure Act 1780	20 Geo. 3. c. 24 Pr.	4 May 1780
An Act for dividing and enclosing the Open and Common Fields, Common Pastures, Common Meadows and other Commonable Lands, within the Parish and Liberties of East Farndon, in the County of Northampton.
Grendon Inclosure Act 1780	20 Geo. 3. c. 25 Pr.	4 May 1780
An Act for dividing and enclosing the Open and Common Fields, Common Pastures, Common Meadows and other Commonable Lands, within the Manor, Parish and Liberties of Grendon, in the County of Northampton.
Thornton Inclosure Act 1780	20 Geo. 3. c. 26 Pr.	4 May 1780
An Act for dividing and enclosing the several Open Fields, Commons, Carrs and Waste Grounds, within the Lordship or Manor of Thornton, in the North Riding of the County of York.
Tiffield Inclosure Act 1780	20 Geo. 3. c. 27 Pr.	4 May 1780
An Act for dividing and enclosing the Open and Common Fields, Common Pastures, Common Meadows and other Commonable Lands and Grounds, of and within the Manor and Parish of Tiffield, in the County of Northampton.
Salthouse and Kelling (Norfolk) Inclosure etc. Act 1780	20 Geo. 3. c. 28 Pr.	4 May 1780
An Act for extinguishing all Rights of Sheepwalk, Common and Shackage, in and over the Common Fields and Half Year Lands, lying within the Parishes of Salthouse and Kelling, in the County of Norfolk; and for dividing and allotting certain Warrens, Heaths, Commons, Waste Lands and Commonable Grounds, within the said Parishes; and for other Purposes therein mentioned.
Northill and Sandy (Bedfordshire) Inclosure Act 1780	20 Geo. 3. c. 29 Pr.	4 May 1780
An Act for dividing and enclosing several Open and Common Fields, Meadows, Commonable Lands and Commons, in the Parishes of Northill and Sandy, in the County of Bedford.
Northwood Common in Noke (Herefordshire) Inclosure Act 1780	20 Geo. 3. c. 30 Pr.	4 May 1780
An Act for dividing and enclosing a certain Common called Northwood or Northwood Common, in the Township of Noke, in the Parish of Pembridge and County of Hereford.
Teirtriff and Hopton (Montgomeryshire) Inclosure Act 1780	20 Geo. 3. c. 31 Pr.	4 May 1780
An Act for dividing and enclosing a certain Open, Common and Waste Lands, within the Manor of Teirtriff, and also a certain Parcel of Open, Common and Waste Lands called Gwern-y-mynydd, within the Manor of Hopton, in the County of Montgomery.
Ickenham Inclosure Act 1780	20 Geo. 3. c. 32 Pr.	4 May 1780
An Act for dividing and enclosing the Open Common Fields, within the Parish of Ickenham, in the County of Middlesex.
Godin's Name Act 1780	20 Geo. 3. c. 33 Pr.	4 May 1780
An Act to enable James Bigot Esquire, an Infant, (lately called James Godin), and the Heirs Male of his Body, and all other Persons who shall become entitled to the Estates late of Peter Bigot Esquire, deceased, under the Limitations contained in his Will, to take and use the Surname of Bigot, pursuant to his said Will.
Haldimand's Naturalization Act 1780	20 Geo. 3. c. 34 Pr.	4 May 1780
An Act for naturalizing Anthony Henry Haldimand.
Findern (Derbyshire) in Mickleover Inclosure Act 1780	20 Geo. 3. c. 35 Pr.	8 May 1780
An Act for dividing, allotting and enclosing the Commons, Open Fields and Common Pastures, in the Liberty of Findern, in the Parish of Mickleover, and County of Derby.
Warminster and Corsley (Wiltshire) Inclosure Act 1780	20 Geo. 3. c. 36 Pr.	8 May 1780
An Act for dividing, allotting and laying in Severalty, the Open and Common Fields and Open Downs, within the Parishes of Warminster and Corsley, in the County of Wilts; and for dividing, allotting and enclosing the Common Meadows, Common Pastures and Waste Lands, within the said Parishes.
Oldswinford Inclosure Act 1780	20 Geo. 3. c. 37 Pr.	8 May 1780
An Act for dividing and enclosing several Commons and Waste Lands in the Parish of Oldswinford, in the County of Worcester.
Hilton Inclosure Act 1780	20 Geo. 3. c. 38 Pr.	8 May 1780
An Act for dividing and enclosing several Open Common Fields, Common Meadows, Common Pastures, Commons and Waste Grounds, within the Manor and Hamlet of Hilton, in the Parish of Marston upon Dove, in the County of Derby.
Lochée's Naturalization Act 1780	20 Geo. 3. c. 39 Pr.	8 May 1780
An Act for naturalizing Lewis Locheé.
Duke of Ancaster and Kesteven's Estate Act 1780	20 Geo. 3. c. 40 Pr.	26 May 1780
An Act for vesting the Fee-Simple of Part of the Estates settled by the Will of the Most Noble Robert late Duke of Ancaster and Kesteven deceased, in Trustees, to be sold, for paying off Debts and Incumbrances affecting the said Estates; and for other Purposes therein mentioned.
Onslow's Estate Act 1780	20 Geo. 3. c. 41 Pr.	26 May 1780
An Act to enable John Ord Esquire, and John Tyton Esquire, Trustees named in the Settlement made previous to the Marriage of the Honourable Thomas Onslow with Arabella his now Wife, to sell the Rents, Services, Duties, Reliefs, Herriots and other Dues and Payments payable, or to be performed or rendered by the Tenants of the several Manors or Lordships comprized in the said Settlement, and to enfranchise the Copyhold Tenements held of such Manors or Lordships; and for laying out the Money which shall arise by such Sale and Enfranchisement, in the Purchase of other Lands, to be settled to the Uses to which the said Manors or Lordships do now stand settled.
Confirming and establishing an exchange agreement between Horatio Lord Walpole and Thomas William Coke of lands in Norfolk comprised in said Lord Walpole's marriage settlement and devised by Thomas Earl of Leicester's will.	20 Geo. 3. c. 42 Pr.	26 May 1780
An Act for confirming and establishing an Exchange agreed to be made between the Right Honourable Horatio Lord Walpole and Thomas William Coke Esquire, of divers Lands in the County of Norfolk, comprized in the Marriage Settlement of the said Horatio Lord Walpole, and devised by the Will of Thomas Earl of Leicester deceased; and for settling the Lands given in Exchange to each Party, to such and the same Uses as the Lands for which the same are exchanged, stood settled and limited.
Viscount Irwin's Estate Act 1780	20 Geo. 3. c. 43 Pr.	26 May 1780
An Act for vesting certain Messuages in the City of London, Part, of the Estates late of Charles Lord Viscount Irwin deceased, in Trustees to be sold, and for purchasing other Estates, to be settled to the same Uses.
Gee's Estate Act 1780	20 Geo. 3. c. 44 Pr.	26 May 1780
An Act for vesting the Real Estates late of Roger Gee of Bishop Burton, in the County of York, Esquire, deceased, in Trustees, to raise Money by Sale or Mortgage thereof, for discharging Incumbrances thereon, and the Debts and Legacies of the said Roger Gee; and for other Purposes therein mentioned.
Molyneux's Estate Act 1780	20 Geo. 3. c. 45 Pr.	26 May 1780
An Act for vesting Part of the Real Estates of Thomas More Molyneux Esquire, deceased, in Trustees, to be sold, for Payment of such of his Debts and Legacies as now remain unsatisfied.
Raine's Charities Act 1780	20 Geo. 3. c. 46 Pr.	26 May 1780
An Act for incorporating the Trustees of the Charities established by the Settlements and Will of Henry Raine Esquire, deceased; and to enable them to take the Freehold and Leasehold Estates, Monies and Funds, granted, assigned, settled and given, for and towards the Support and Maintenance of the said Charities, to them and their Successors, in Perpetuity, for the Charitable Uses and Purposes in the said Settlements and Will expressed; and for the better Regulation and Management of the said Charities.
Copley's Estate Act 1780	20 Geo. 3. c. 47 Pr.	26 May 1780
An Act for vesting Part of the Freehold Estates of Thomas Copley Esquire, in Trustees, for a Term of One thousand Years, in Trust to raise by way of Mortgage thereof, a Sum of Money, for the Purposes therein mentioned.
Welbourn-cum-Sapperton Inclosure Act 1780	20 Geo. 3. c. 48 Pr.	26 May 1780
An Act for dividing and enclosing certain Heath Lands called The South Heaths and The North Heath, in the Parish of Welbourn cum Sapperton, in the County of Lincoln.
Shenington Inclosure Act 1780	20 Geo. 3. c. 49 Pr.	26 May 1780
An Act for dividing and enclosing the Open and Common Field, and other Commonable Lands and Grounds, lying within the Parish and Liberties of Shennington, in the County of Gloucester.
Stratton Audley and Caversfield Inclosure Act 1780	20 Geo. 3. c. 50 Pr.	26 May 1780
An Act for dividing and enclosing the Open and Common Fields, Common Pastures, Common Meadows and other Commonable Lands and Grounds, of and within the Manors and Parishes of Stratton Audley, in the County of Oxford, and Caversfield, in the County of Bucks.
Wright's Name Act 1780	20 Geo. 3. c. 51 Pr.	26 May 1780
An Act to enable John Ingilby Esquire (lately called John Wright) to take, use and bear the Surname and Arms of Ingilby, pursuant to the Will of Sir John Ingilby Baronet, deceased.
Gee's Name Act 1780	20 Geo. 3. c. 52 Pr.	26 May 1780
An Act to enable Richard Gee the Younger, Esquire, and his Issue Male, to take and use the Surname and bear the Arms of Carew, pursuant to the Will of Sir Nicholas Hackett Carew, Baronet, deceased.
Whittington Inclosure Act 1780	20 Geo. 3. c. 53 Pr.	19 June 1780
An Act for rendering effectual an Act, made in the Seventeenth Year of His present Majesty, (Note: Whittington Inclosure Act 1777 (17 Geo. 3 c. 63 Pr.)) for dividing and enclosing the Commons or Waste Lands within the Manor of Whittington, in the County of Salop.
Foulden Inclosure Act 1780	20 Geo. 3. c. 54 Pr.	19 June 1780
An Act for dividing and enclosing the Common Fields, Half Year Lands, Fen Lands, Lammas Meadows, Heaths, Commons and Waste Lands, within the Parish of Foulden, in the County of Norfolk.
Pontefract Park Dividing Act 1780	20 Geo. 3. c. 55 Pr.	19 June 1780
An Act for dividing the Park of Pontefract, in the County of York; and for other Purposes therein mentioned.
Moss and Kirk Bramwith (Yorkshire, West Riding) Inclosures Act 1780	20 Geo. 3. c. 56 Pr.	19 June 1780
An Act for dividing and enclosing the Commons and Waste Grounds, within the Township of Moss otherwise Moseley, in the Parish of Campsall; and also the Open Arable Fields, Meadows, Pastures, Commons and Waste Grounds, within the Parish of Kirk Bramwith, in the West Riding of the County of York.
Croydon Palace Act 1780	20 Geo. 3. c. 57 Pr.	23 June 1780
An Act for vesting in Trustees the Capital Messuage, with the Appurtenances, at Croydon, in the County of Surrey, known by the Name of The Palace of the Archbishop of Canterbury, and Two Closes near thereto adjoining, in Trust to sell the same; and for disposing of, and applying the Money to arise thereby, and received on account of the Dilapidations thereof, and other Money in the Manner and for the Purposes therein mentioned.
Humberston's Estate Act 1780	20 Geo. 3. c. 58 Pr.	3 July 1780
An Act for vesting certain Manors and Hereditaments situate in the County of Lincoln, (which by the Will of Thomas Humberston Esquire, deceased, were devised to Thomas Frederick Mackenzie Humberston Esquire, for his Life, with several Remainders over, in strict Settlement), in Trustees, for the Purpose of selling the same, and laying out the Monies to arise from such Sale, in the Purchase of certain other Hereditaments, Part of the Estates of the Right Honourable Kenneth Mackenzie Earl of Seaforth, in the Kingdom of Ireland, to be settled to the Uses to which the Estates intended to be sold now stand limited.
Thrapston Inclosure Act 1780	20 Geo. 3. c. 59 Pr.	3 July 1780
An Act for dividing and enclosing the Open and Common Fields, Common Pastures, Common Meadows and other Commonable Lands and Grounds of and within the Manor and Parish of Thrapston, in the County of Northampton.
Brixworth Inclosure Act 1780	20 Geo. 3. c. 60 Pr.	3 July 1780
An Act for dividing, allotting and enclosing the Open and Common Fields, Common Pastures, Common Meadows and other Commonable Lands and Grounds of and within the Parish of Brixworth otherwise Bricklesworth, in the County of Northampton.
Grewelthorpe Inclosure Act 1780	20 Geo. 3. c. 61 Pr.	3 July 1780
An Act for dividing and enclosing certain Moors, Commons, or Waste Grounds in the Manor or Township of Grewelthorp, in the West Riding of the County of York.
Little Catworth Inclosure Act 1780	20 Geo. 3. c. 62 Pr.	3 July 1780
An Act for dividing and enclosing the Common and Open Fields, Meadows, Commonable Lands and Waste Grounds in Little Catworth, in the County of Huntingdon.

=== Sources ===
- Pickering, Danby, ed. (1780). "Anno vicesimo Georgii III". The Statutes at Large. Vol. 33. Cambridge: Charles Bathurst. pp. 1–178 – via Internet Archive.
- Pickering, Danby, ed. (1780). "Anno vicesimo Georgii III". The Statutes at Large. Vol. 33. Cambridge: Charles Bathurst. pp. 1–178 – via Google Books.
- Journals of the House of Commons. Vol. 37. London: His Majesty's Stationery Office. 1803. pp. 461–939 – via Google Books.
- Chronological Table of and Index to the Statutes. Vol. 1: To the End of the Session 59 Vict. Sess. 2 (1895) (13th ed.). London: Her Majesty's Stationery Office. 1896. pp. 137–138 – via Google Books.
- "Acts of the Parliament of Great Britain from 1780". legislation.gov.uk. The National Archives.

== See also ==
- List of acts of the Parliament of Great Britain
