= Continuance of Laws Act 1780 =

Act of the Parliament of Great Britain

- Act of Parliament
- Parliament of Great Britain
- Long title: An Act for continuing an Act made in the last Session of Parliament, for allowing the Importation of fine organzined Italian thrown Silk, in any Ships or Vessels, for a limited Time.
- Citation: 20 Geo. 3. c. 4
- Territorial extent: Great Britain

Dates
- Royal assent: 15 December 1779
- Commencement: 25 November 1779 (Note: Start of session.)
- Repealed: 21 August 1871

Other legislation
- Amends: See § Continued enactments
- Repealed by: Statute Law Revision Act 1871
- Relates to: See Expiring laws continuance acts

Status: Repealed

Text of statute as originally enacted

The Continuance of Laws Act 1780 (20 Geo. 3. c. 4) was an act of the Parliament of Great Britain that continued various older acts.

== Background ==
In the United Kingdom, acts of Parliament remain in force until expressly repealed. Many acts of parliament, however, contained time-limited sunset clauses, requiring legislation to revive enactments that had expired or to continue enactments that would otherwise expire.

== Provisions ==
=== Continued enactments ===
Section 1 of the act continued the Importation of Silk Act 1779 (19 Geo. 3. c. 9) from the expiration of the act until the end of the next session of parliament after 25 March 1781.

== Subsequent developments ==
The Select Committee on Temporary Laws, Expired or Expiring, appointed in 1796, inspected and considered all temporary laws, observing irregularities in the construction of expiring laws continuance acts, making recommendations and emphasising the importance of the Committee for Expired and Expiring Laws.

The whole act was repealed by section 1 of, and the schedule to, the Statute Law Revision Act 1871 (34 & 35 Vict. c. 116), which came into force on 21 August 1871.
