= Hoton =

Hoton may refer to:

- Hoton, Leicestershire
- Hoton, first name unknown, who founded the Independent Church within the LDS movement
