= Exportation (No. 2) Act 1788 =

Act of the Parliament of Great Britain

- Act of Parliament
- Parliament of Great Britain
- Long title: An Act to explain, amend, and reduce into one Act of Parliament, several Laws now in being for preventing the Exportation of live Sheep, Rams, and Lambs, Wool, Woolfels, Mortlings, Shortlings, Yarn, and Worsted, Cruels, Coverlids, Waddings, and other Manufactures, or pretended Manufactures, made of Wool slightly wrought up, or otherwise put together, so as the same may be reduced to and made use of as Wool again, Mattrasses or Beds stuffed with combed Wool, or Wool fit for combing, Fullers Earth, Fulling Clay, and Tobacco Pipe Clay, from this Kingdom, and from the Isles of Jersey, Guernsey, Alderney, Sark, and Man, into Foreign Parts; and for rendering more effectual an Act passed in the Twenty-third Year of the Reign of King Henry the Eighth, intituled, "An Act for the winding of Wool."
- Citation: 28 Geo. 3. c. 38
- Territorial extent: Great Britain; Jersey; Guernsey; Alderney; Sark; Isle of Man

Dates
- Royal assent: 25 June 1788
- Commencement: 27 November 1787 (Note: Start of session.)
- Repealed: 6 August 1861

Other legislation
- Amends: See § Repealed enactments
- Repeals/revokes: See § Repealed enactments
- Amended by: Removal of Wool Act 1814; Fullers Earth, etc. Act 1817; Registry of Wool Act 1821; Customs Law Repeal Act 1825
- Repealed by: Statute Law Revision Act 1861

Status: Repealed

Text of statute as originally enacted

The Exportation (No. 2) Act 1788 (28 Geo. 3. c. 38) was an act of the Parliament of Great Britain that consolidated acts relating to the exportation of wool in Great Britain, the Channel Islands and the Isle of Man.

== Background ==
The regulations and restrictions related to the exportation of wool from the Kingdom of Great Britain and the isles of Jersey, Guernsey, Sark, Alderney and Man had become numerous and disparate, leading to the desire for consolidation.

== Provisions ==
=== Repealed enactments ===
Section 1 of the act repealed all acts in force so much "as relate in any manner to the carrying coastwise, or to the said isles, or any of them, or to prevent the exportation of the following articles, goods or commodities; (that is to say) live sheep, rams and lambs, wool, woolsels, mortlings, shortlings, yarn or worsted made of wool woolflocks, cruels, coverlids, waddings, or other manufactures, or pretended manufactures, made of wool slightly wrought up, or otherwise put together, so as the same may be reduced to and made use as wool again, or mattrasses or beds stuffed with combed wool, or wool fit for combing or carding, or any fuller's earth, fulling clay, tobacco-pipe clay", except for so much of the Exportation Act 1697 (9 & 10 Will. 3 c. 40) "as relates to wool shorn, laid up or lodged within ten miles of the sea tide within the counties of Kent or Sussex, or either of them, or to any person or persons residing within fifteen miles of the sea of the said counties of Kent or Sussex".

== Subsequent developments ==
The Select Committee on Temporary Laws described this act as a Consolidation Act.

The act was amended by the Removal of Wool Act 1814 (54 Geo. 3. c. 78), which repealed so much of the act as respects the removal of wool, within a certain distance of the sea.

The act was amended by the Fullers Earth, etc. Act 1817 (57 Geo. 3. c. 88), which permitted fuller's earth, fulling clay and tobacco pipe clay to be carried by sea under certain restrictions.

The act was amended by the Registry of Wool Act 1821 (1 & 2 Geo. 4. c. 81), so far as the act required registry of wool sent by sea.

The whole act was repealed by the Customs Law Repeal Act 1825 (6 Geo. 4. c. 105), which contained savings for:

1. Any repeals of former acts contained within the act, which remain in effect.
2. Arrears of duties or drawbacks that had become due and payable prior to the act.
3. Any penalty or forfeiture which had been incurred under the acts.
4. Any parts of the act relating to Ireland that create or regulate jurisdiction for the trial of offenses committed there.

For the avoidance of doubt, given these savings, the whole act was repealed by section 1 of, and the schedule to, the Statute Law Revision Act 1871 (34 & 35 Vict. c. 116), which came into force on 21 August 1871.
