= Burton's Mill =

Factory in Middleton, Lancashire attacked in 1812

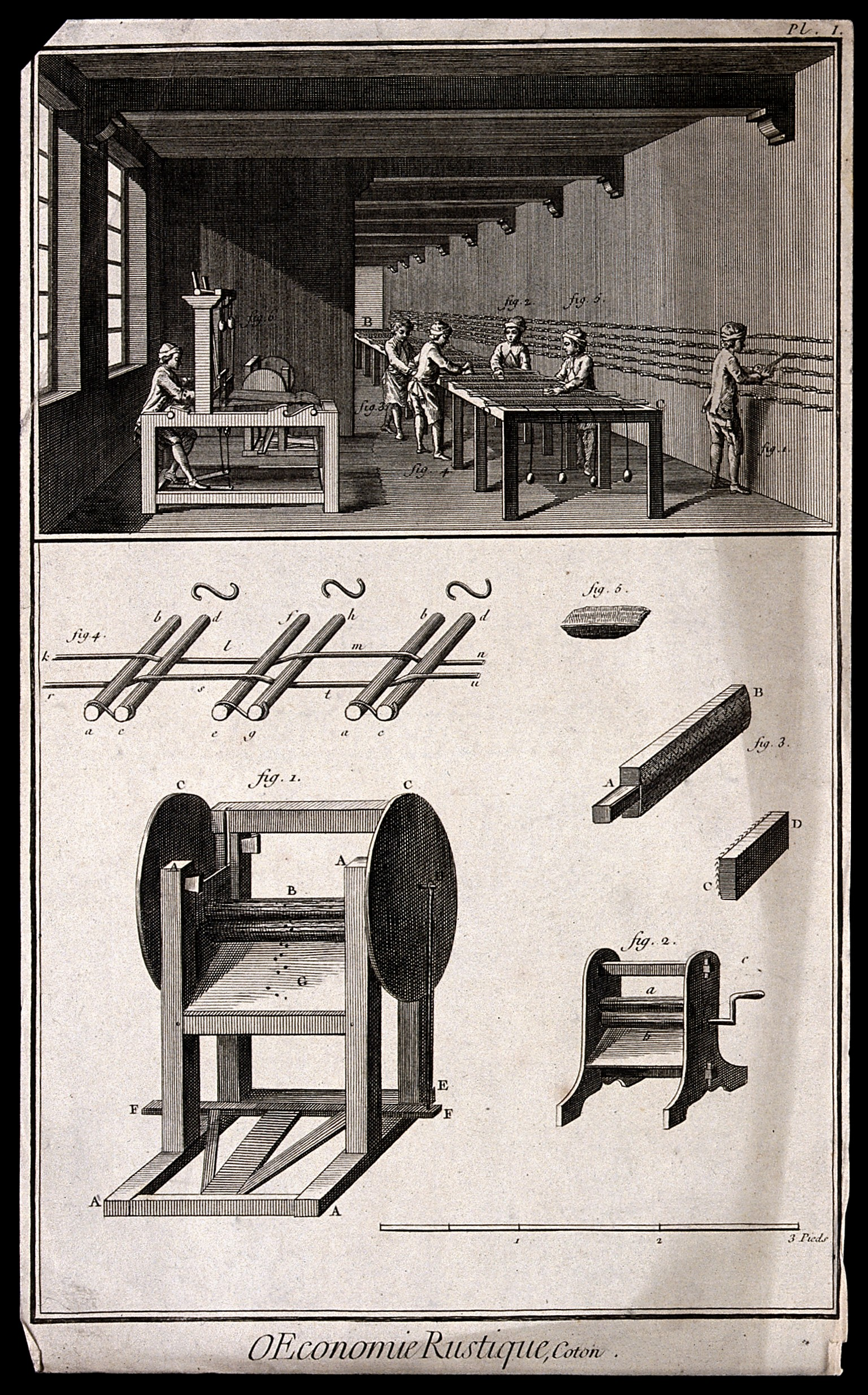
Carding and spinning cotton (engraving), typical processes in early nineteenth-century cotton mills.

Burton's Mill was a steam-powered cotton weaving factory in Middleton, Lancashire, now Greater Manchester. It was operated by the firm Daniel Burton and Sons. The mill is chiefly known as the target of a major attack during the Lancashire Luddite disturbances. The mill and the homes of members of the Burton family were attacked by a large crowd; defenders fired on the rioters, causing multiple deaths and injuries.

Local heritage material states that a water-powered cotton spinning mill at the bottom of Wood Street—later associated with the Burton firm and the 1812 disturbances—was built by John Jackson in c.1800.

== Background ==
Middleton experienced rapid industrial and commercial change in the late 18th and early 19th centuries. A market charter granted in 1791 established a weekly market and three annual fairs, and local authorities later commemorated the charter and the construction of associated market buildings and warehouses.

The disturbances of 1812 occurred amid severe economic and social tensions in the Lancashire cotton district. Contemporary accounts described food scarcity and food-riot conditions in Manchester in early 1812, alongside anger directed at machinery and those associated with mechanised production. Randall argues that a regional economy that had expanded during the early years of war was pushed into a deepening downturn by the cumulative effects of wartime trade policy, including the British Orders in Council (from 1807) and U.S. commercial retaliation (including the Non-Intercourse Act of 1809), which damaged export markets for Lancashire cotton goods and contributed to unemployment; these pressures were compounded by deficient harvests in 1810 and 1811 and rising food prices.

Lancashire's textile industry also depended on imported raw cotton shipped through Liverpool from Atlantic sources. Research on Liverpool's cotton trade finds that Brazilian cotton accounted for a substantial share of imports in the 1790s, alongside supplies from the West Indies. A cotton-trade timeline maintained by the International Cotton Association notes that imports of American cotton exceeded those from the West Indies by 1802, and provides import totals for 1810, reflecting the growing importance of U.S. supply to British manufacturers in the early nineteenth century. A museum overview similarly notes that much of the cotton used by Manchester-area manufacturers was grown on plantations in the Caribbean and South America, with increasing reliance on cotton produced in the United States as output expanded.

The Middleton disturbances (20–21 April 1812) occurred weeks before the United States formally declared war on Great Britain (18 June 1812).

== April 1812 attacks ==
=== 20 April ===
On 20 April 1812 a large crowd gathered near the mill in Wood Street. According to Samuel Bamford, the mill owners had advance warning and selected employees remained to defend the premises; Bamford wrote that weavers, dressers and overlookers had been drilled for some time for the mill's defence.

Bamford further recorded that early gunfire from the mill appeared not to injure anyone, leading some in the crowd to believe that the defenders "dare not shoot bullets"; he then described a change as shots were fired with ball, resulting in multiple casualties and deaths, after which the crowd dispersed and troops arrived. A separate contemporary narrative by Archibald Prentice similarly described an initial discharge intended to intimidate, followed by ball being fired and deaths and injuries among the crowd.

Modern historian Adrian Randall places the Middleton violence within the wider Lancashire Luddite disturbances, noting that the attack on the Burton factory was met by defensive fire that killed and wounded rioters.

=== 21 April ===
On 21 April 1812 further violence occurred in Middleton. Contemporary accounts described attacks on property associated with the Burton family and further armed confrontations as troops attempted to control the town and make arrests.

Randall describes the crowd carrying an effigy of “General Ludd” and a red flag, and reports that the mill's defences again held, but that “Burton’s house” was destroyed before the military could intervene effectively. The destruction of Burton property at Parkfield (commonly referred to as Park House) is also noted in later biographical writing on Emanuel Burton.

=== Casualties ===
Contemporary accounts agree that the exchange of fire at the mill on 20 April caused multiple deaths and injuries among the rioters, though reported totals vary by source. Bamford described several wounded and "three fell dead" during the firing at Wood Street, while Prentice also reported deaths and injuries during the confrontations and additional fatalities during subsequent pursuits and arrests. Randall likewise notes that rioters were killed and wounded by defensive fire during the attack on the Burton factory.

=== Related disturbances ===
The Middleton violence formed part of a wider cluster of Luddite and anti-machinery attacks in Lancashire and the surrounding district in 1812. Randall notes that disturbances in the Stockport area included attacks on Goodair's mill at Edgley, as well as disorder and food-related unrest in Manchester.

A contemporary-focused online project has also published transcriptions relating to Stockport solicitor John Lloyd's correspondence about local disturbances, including references to attacks on Goodair and other targets (as a transcription rather than a scholarly edition).

=== Aftermath ===
In the wake of the attacks, Randall reports that Daniel Burton and Sons issued a notice that they had “determined not to work their looms any more,” with contemporary claims that insurers would not cover the firm's losses. The Middleton episode was among the key turning points in Lancashire Luddism, after which overt daylight assaults on major factories became more difficult due to heavier military protection, and the pattern of disorder shifted toward other forms of resistance and repression.

=== Contemporary descriptions ===
Nineteenth-century writers left detailed descriptions of the April 1812 disturbances at Middleton, including radical memoirist Samuel Bamford and Manchester journalist Archibald Prentice.

Bamford described the ransacking of Emanuel Burton's residence at Parkfield, including children joining in the destruction: "the younger ones crunching lumps of loaf sugar ... nearly every article of furniture was irretrievably broken." In the same narrative, Bamford wrote that Burton's defenders had prepared in advance (including drilling with firearms) and that small pieces of ordnance were positioned within the mill-yard; he further stated that after an initial period of stone-throwing and gunfire that many in the crowd interpreted as non-lethal, live fire began and three men were killed.

Prentice, quoting the contemporary historian Edward Cowdroy, wrote that when the factory could not be carried, the insurgents turned to Burton's house: "they then flew to the house of Mr. Emanuel Burton, where they wreaked their vengeance by setting it on fire, the whole, with its valuable furniture, being soon in one state of conflagration." In the same passage, Prentice reported that firing with ball began after about fifteen minutes, killing three men that night; he also stated that on the following day five more were shot during renewed fighting as troops arrived from Manchester.

A later local history similarly summarized that after the initial repulse at the factory, "Mr. Burton's house was burnt before military assistance could be brought to the spot."

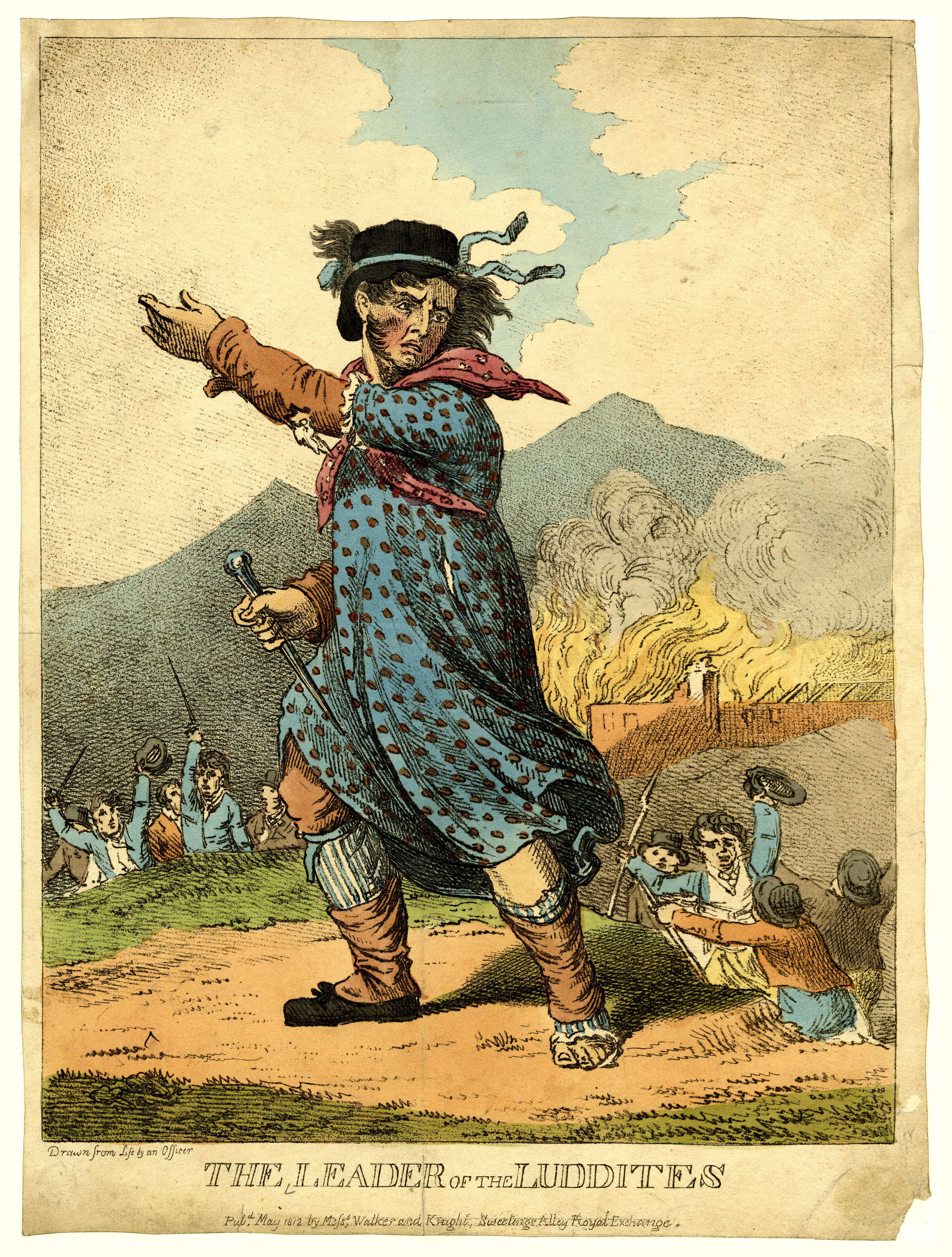
Contemporary depiction (1812) associated with the Luddite movement.

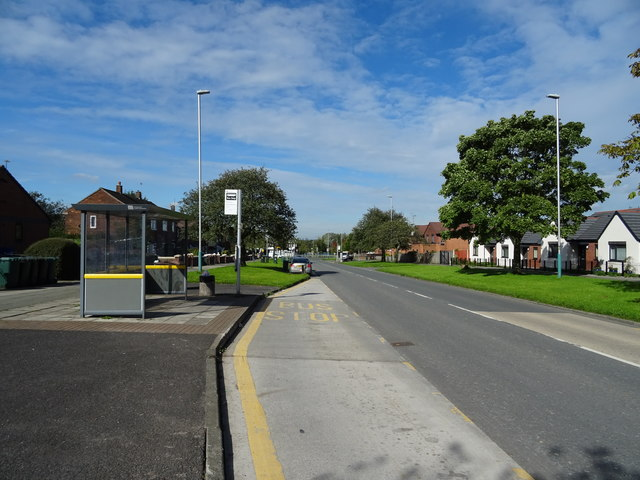
Wood Street, Middleton (some distance north-west of the reported site of Burton's Mill).

== See also ==
- Luddite
- Industrial Revolution
- Middleton, Greater Manchester
