= Destruction of Stocking Frames, etc. Act 1812 =

Act of the Parliament of the United Kingdom

- Act of Parliament
- Parliament of the United Kingdom
- Long title: An Act for the more exemplary Punishment of destroying or injuring any Stocking or Lace Frames Machines or Engines used in the Framework or any Articles or Goods in such Frames to continue in force until the First Day One thousand eight hundred and fourteen.
- Citation: 52 Geo. 3. c. 16
- Territorial extent: United Kingdom

Dates
- Royal assent: 20 March 1812
- Commencement: 20 March 1812 (Note: The Acts of Parliament (Commencement) Act 1793.)
- Repealed: 20 December 1813
Other legislation
Repealed by	Destruction of Stocking Frames, etc. Act 1813
Relates to	Protection of Stocking Frames, etc. Act 1788

Status: Repealed

Text of statute as originally enacted

Destruction of Stocking Frames, etc. Act 1813
- Act of Parliament
- Parliament of the United Kingdom
- Long title: An act to repeal an Act of the Fifty second Year of His present Majesty, for the Punishment of Persons destroying Stocking or Lace Frames, or any Articles in such Frames, and to make other Provisions instead thereof.
- Citation: 54 Geo. 3. c. 42
- Territorial extent: United Kingdom

Dates
- Royal assent: 20 December 1813
- Commencement: 20 December 1813
- Repealed: 11 July 1817
Other legislation
Repeals/revokes	Destruction of Stocking Frames, etc. Act 1812
Repealed by	Destroying Stocking Frames, etc. Act 1817
Relates to	Protection of Stocking Frames, etc. Act 1788

Status: Repealed

Text of statute as originally enacted

Destroying Stocking Frames, etc. Act 1817
- Act of Parliament
- Parliament of the United Kingdom
- Long title: An Act to repeal an Act, passed in the Fifty fourth Year of His present Majesty, for the Punishment of Persons destroying Stocking or Lace Frames, and Articles in such Frames; and to make, until the First Day of August One thousand eight hundred and twenty, other Provisions in lieu thereof.
- Citation: 57 Geo. 3. c. 126
- Territorial extent: United Kingdom

Dates
- Royal assent: 11 July 1817
- Commencement: 11 July 1817
- Repealed: 5 August 1873
Other legislation
Repeals/revokes	Destruction of Stocking Frames, etc. Act 1813
Repealed by	Statute Law Revision Act 1873

Status: Repealed

Text of statute as originally enacted

The Destruction of Stocking Frames, etc. Act 1812 (52 Geo. 3. c. 16), also known as the Frame-Breaking Act and before passage as the Frame Work Bill, was an act of the Parliament of the United Kingdom, passed by the British Government in 1812 aimed at increasing the penalties for Luddite behaviour in order to discourage it.

== Passage ==
The Frame Work Bill was introduced to Parliament on 14 February 1812 by the Home Secretary Richard Ryder, acting in concert with Spencer Perceval (who was at that time both Chancellor of the Exchequer and Prime Minister), the Attorney General Sir Vicary Gibbs, the Solicitor General Sir Thomas Plumer, and three Nottinghamshire MPs concerned about the Luddite Movement taking hold in their constituencies. Rushed through as an "emergency measure", the act was passed with an overwhelming majority and received royal assent on 20 March, despite opposition. Fundamentally, there was agreement between members of the government and the opposition that the measure was a last resort; but where supporters believed that all other avenues had been exhausted, opponents (seeing relative tranquillity over the winter period) did not. The newly created Lord Byron used his maiden speech in the House of Lords to oppose the bill.

== Provisions ==
The act, as passed, made the destruction of mechanised looms (stocking frames) a capital felony (and hence a crime punishable by death). Similarly raised to the level of capital felony were the associated crimes of damaging frames and entering a property with intent to damage a frame. In these respects the act was a stronger version of the Protection of Stocking Frames, etc. Act 1788, which had made similar acts punishable by 7–14 years in a penal colony. All measures included in the act were only to be applied temporarily, and were duly set to expire on 1 March 1814.

== Significance ==
Although approximately 60 to 70 Luddites were hanged in the period that the statute was in force, no death sentences seem to have been justified on its grounds, with judges preferring to use existing legislation. Due to come to an end on 1 March, the act was officially repealed in 1814 with the passage of the Destruction of Stocking Frames, etc. Act 1813 (54 Geo. 3. c. 42), which instituted a new maximum penalty for the destruction of stocking frames of life transportation; in 1817, that act would itself be repealed and the death penalty once again reinstated in the Destroying Stocking Frames, etc. Act 1817 (57 Geo. 3. c. 126). By that time, however, Luddism had largely subsided as a movement. The 1817 Act was repealed in 1873 as part of a general repeal of obsolete statute law.

== See also ==
- United Kingdom labour law
