= Stocking frame =

Mechanical knitting machine

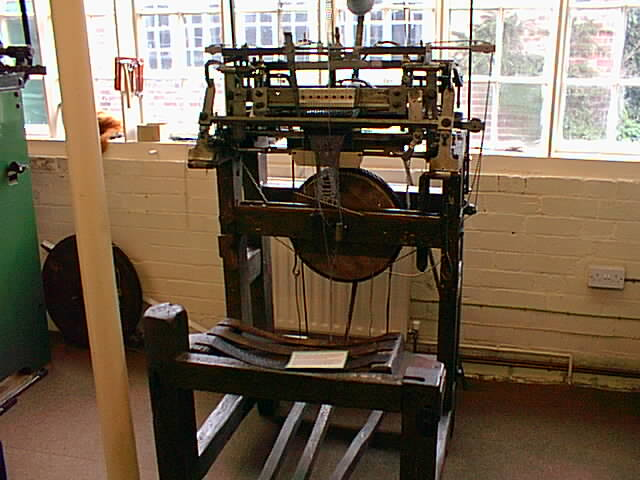
Stocking frame at Ruddington Framework Knitters' Museum

A stocking frame was a mechanical knitting machine used in the textiles industry. It was invented by William Lee of Calverton near Nottingham in 1589. Its use, known traditionally as framework knitting, was the first major stage in the mechanisation of the textile industry, and played an important part in the early history of the Industrial Revolution. It was adapted to knit cotton and to do ribbing, and by 1800 had been adapted as a lace making machine.

== Description ==
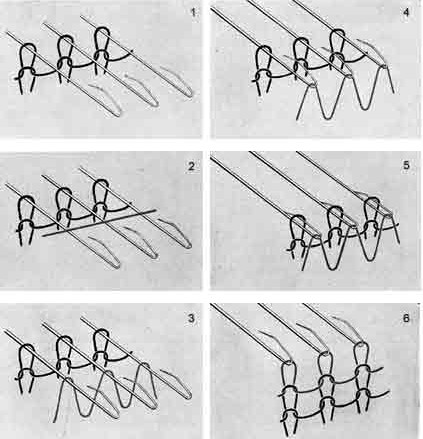
Six stages in the knitting machine cycle

Lee's machine consisted of a stout wooden frame. It did straight knitting, not tubular knitting. It had a separate needle for each loop – these were low carbon steel bearded needles where the tips were reflexed and could be depressed onto a hollow, closing the loop. The needles were supported on a needle bar that passed back and forth, to and from the operator. The beards were simultaneously depressed by a presser bar. The first machine had eight needles per inch and was suitable for worsted. The next version had 16 needles per inch and was suitable for silk.

The mechanical movements:

1. The needle bar goes forward; the open needles clear the web.
2. The weft thread is laid on the needles; the jack sinkers descend and form loops.
3. The weft thread is pushed down by the divider bar.
4. The jack sinkers come forward pulling the thread into the beard of the open needles.
5. The presser bar drops, the needle loops close and the old row of stitches is drawn off the needle.
6. The jack sinkers come down in front of the knitting and pull it up so the process can begin again.

== Early history ==
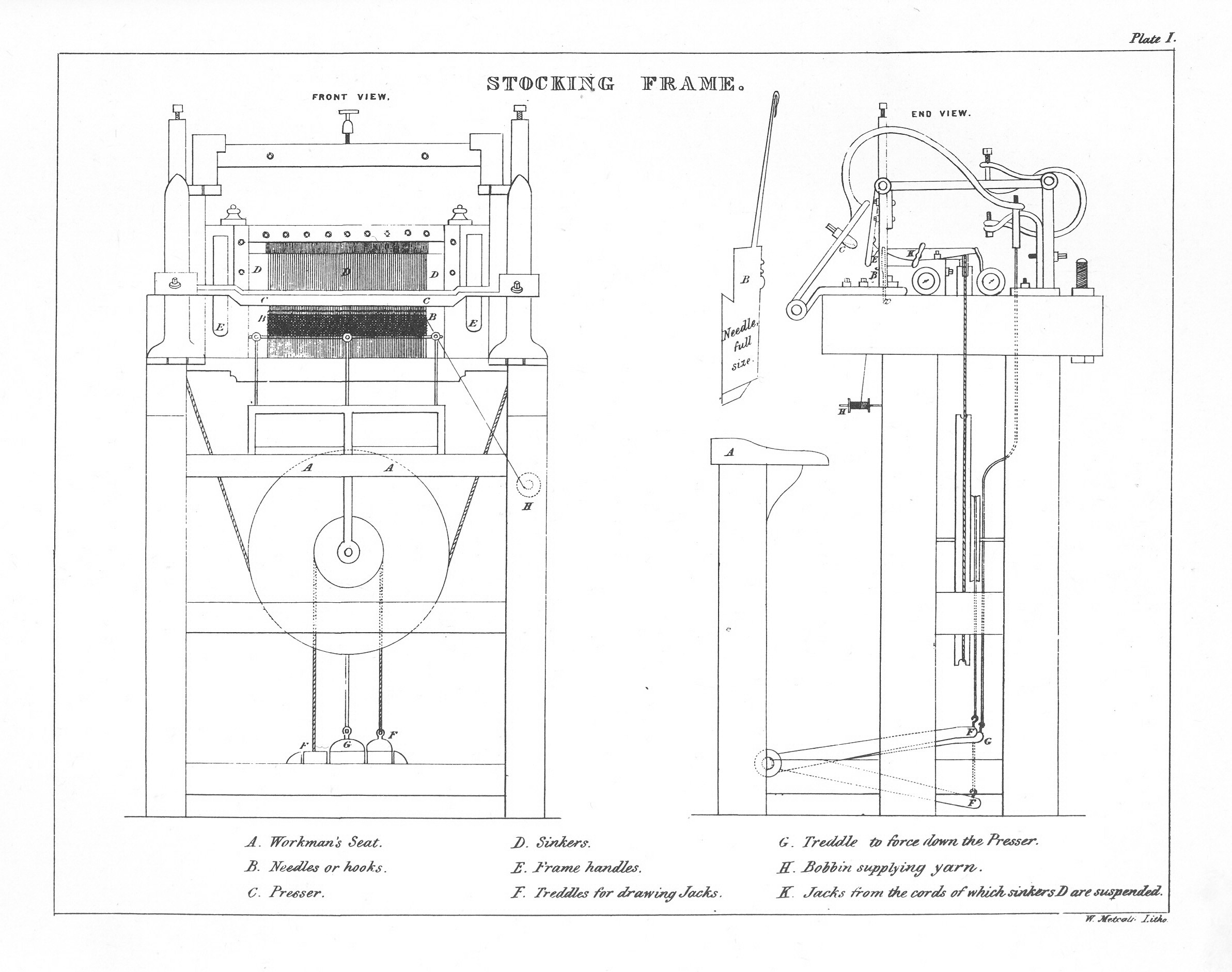
Stocking frame

The machine imitated the movements of hand knitters. Lee demonstrated the operation of the device at court and sought a patent. He later took machines and workmen to France and continued attempts to establish stocking manufacture there before his death in the early seventeenth century.

The original frame had eight needles to the inch, which produced only coarse fabric. Lee later improved the mechanism with 20 needles to the inch. By the late 1590s, he was able to knit stockings from silk, as well as wool.

The commercial outcome of Lee's early ventures did not immediately secure permanent patronage for him in England. Lee travelled and sought support abroad; records place him in France in the early 1600s and his death is usually given as about 1614.

The outcome of Lee's initial enterprise might have led to a dead-end for the knitting machine, but John Ashton, one of Lee's assistants, introduced a mechanism known as the "divider", which guided bearded needles as they were drawn forward and materially improved the practical operation of the frame.

== Development and spread ==
=== England ===
Following William Lee’s death around 1614, the stocking frame industry in England expanded at a gradually accelerating pace for well over a century. By 1644, London housed approximately 400 to 500 frames, while Nottinghamshire had about 150.

Around 1680, Nicholas Alsop introduced stocking frames to Leicester, where he initially worked in secret due to local resistance, employing his sons and relatives’ children as apprentices.

The organizational centre of the trade shifted as well. In 1728, Nottingham magistrates rejected the authority of the London-based Worshipful Company of Framework Knitters, marking a power shift northwards. Nottingham, already a centre for lace making, soon became a principal hub for framework knitting.

By 1750, England had approximately 14,000 stocking frames in use, with improvements increasing needle density to as many as 38 needles per inch, allowing finer fabric production.

A pivotal innovation came in 1758 when Jedediah Strutt introduced the "Derby rib" attachment, adding an extra set of bearded needles operating vertically. This enabled the production of ribbing—combining plain and purl stitches to create a tighter, more flexible fabric—expanding hosiery styles and demand.

During this period, Nottingham framework knitters increasingly faced shortages of raw materials. Although initially relying on thread spun in India, its high cost and the need for doubling prompted efforts to spin cotton domestically. Spinners used to long wool fibres struggled with cotton, while spinners in Gloucester—familiar with shorter wool fibres—adapted better and became competitors.

To apply mechanical power to a stocking frame, it would need to be adapted for rotary motion. In 1769, Samuel Wise, a clockmaker, took out a patent for changing the hand frame into a rotary. In Nottingham's case, steam coal was easily available from the Nottinghamshire coalfield.

The industrialisation and spread of stocking frames provoked social tensions. The British government passed the Protection of Stocking Frames, etc. Act 1788 in response to widespread Luddite unrest and the destruction of knitting machinery by displaced workers.

=== Continental Europe ===
Following William Lee’s move to France in the early 1600s, stocking frame technology was introduced to continental Europe and spread, though to a lesser extent than England.

In France, the stocking frame gained significant traction, particularly in textile centres such as Lyon and Paris. By the late 17th century and early 18th century, several thousand frames were in operation, primarily producing silk and cotton stockings as well as lace. By 1800, France had over 2,000 stocking frames.

The migration of skilled Huguenot refugees after the revocation of the Edict of Nantes in 1685 helped spread the technology further across France and into other parts of continental Europe.

Outside France, adoption was more limited. The Netherlands and German-speaking regions like Saxony, the Rhineland, and Prussia saw some framework knitting industries develop in the 18th century, but they generally lagged behind England in mechanisation and scale.

=== Scotland ===
The stocking frame was introduced into Scotland around 1771. By the late 18th century, an extensive trade in the manufacture of stockings had developed, particularly in the Lowlands. In 1844, Scotland counted 2,605 stocking frames, over half of which were located around Hawick or Dumfries.

=== United States ===
In the United States, the traditional stocking frame was adapted rather than directly imported in large numbers. Stocking frames first arrived to the Thirteen Colonies in 1723. The frames were brought by German settlers in Chester, Pennsylvania, circumventing strict English regulations against the exportation of stocking frames to the colonies.

In 1831, Timothy Baily of Albany, New York applied water power to an existing frame, marking the first powered knitwear production in America.

== Derby Rib machine ==
The Derby Rib machine was invented in 1757 by Strutt. It consisted of an extra set of bearded needles that operated vertically, taking the loop and reversing them. This allowed a plain and purl knit to be used, and led to ribbing and a tighter more flexible fabric. To do a 3:1 rib, there would be one vertical needle after every third horizontal needle.

== Lace making ==
Lacey knits can be achieved by slipping a stitch, picking up a stitch or knitting two together. On a frame, a tickler wire could release individual loops and create a run that would be picked up by hand. The frame was modified by adding a tickler bar and a tuck presser, to allow held and tuck stitches. Here the weft was held in the beard and carried up to the next course where two threads were passed together. Messrs Morris and Betts took a patent (807) in 1764 on a stitch transfer device where threads from one needle were passed to another. With tuck stitches, this created 'eyelet holes'. Partial stitch transfer produced a marker stitch.

In 1764, a profound change was made to the stocking frame that enabled it to produce weft-knitted nets. Hammond, the attributed inventor, used ticklers to stitch-transfer from one needle to the third one along crossing over two intermediate needles creating a cross stitch. He also used a tickler to move two stitches two to the right, and then two to the left in a double cross stitch, Valenciennes lace. To do this the tickler bar was detached from the frame and attached to 'dogs', that is, jointed arms. This allowed forward motion to scoop, and sideways motion to shog. New inventions were patented: Frost's tickler net of 1769, the two plain net of 1777 and the square net of 1781, and their patents were fiercely defended. Harvey changed the shape of the tickler wires to avoid one in his pin machine. This became popular in Lyon and Paris where 2000 frames were in use in 1800.

In 1803, cotton was used with silk, as Houldsworths were producing 300 count cotton.

== Decline ==
As the 19th century progressed, the stocking frame declined in prominence due to multiple factors. Changing fashion trends, such as the increased popularity of trousers over stockings, led to reduced demand for knitted hosiery. This downturn caused wages to fall and heightened competition among framework knitters, impacting their livelihoods.

Technological advancements also played a crucial role. The introduction of wider frames in the late 18th century allowed the production of larger fabric pieces, simplifying garment manufacturing but reducing the skill required from workers and driving wages down. Later, steam-powered knitting machines and fully mechanised factories in the mid-19th century displaced the manual stocking frames, enabling faster, cheaper production at scale.

== Folklore and legend ==
A number of popular stories grew up around William Lee and the origin of the stocking frame. One such later tradition, recorded in the nineteenth century, relates a royal audience with Queen Elizabeth I and attributes to her a remark commonly quoted in later retellings:

"Thou aimest high, Master Lee. Consider thou what the invention could do to my poor subjects. It would assuredly bring to them ruin by depriving them of employment, thus making them beggars."

Supposedly, this rebuke and a refusal to grant a patent demoralised Lee and led to his emigration to France. This formulation is recorded in a nineteenth-century narrative of framework knitters' memories collected by Gravener Henson (1831). As this quote and story are not found in the historical record prior to the 19th century, historians dismiss its veracity.

Another legend recounts that Lee had invented the first machine in order to get revenge on a lover who had preferred to concentrate on her knitting rather than attend to him. A painting illustrating this story was once displayed in the Stocking Framer's Guild hall in London. In 1846, the Victorian artist Alfred Elmore produced a variation on the story in his popular painting The Invention of the Stocking Loom, in which Lee is depicted pondering his idea as he watches his wife knitting (Nottingham Castle Museum).

== See also ==
- Luddism
- Protection of Stocking Frames, etc. Act 1788
- Destruction of Stocking Frames, etc. Act 1812
- Water frame
- Bobbinet
- Worshipful Company of Framework Knitters where it appears in their coat of arms
