= Protection of Stocking Frames, etc. Act 1788 =

Act of the Parliament of Great Britain

- Act of Parliament
- Parliament of Great Britain
- Long title: An Act for the better and more effectual Protection of Stocking Frames and the Machines or Engines annexed thereto or used therewith and for the Punishment of Persons destroying or injuring of such Stocking Frames Machines or Engines and the Framework knitted Pieces Stockings and other Articles and Goods used and made in the Hosiery or Framework knitted Manufactory or breaking or destroying any Machinery contained in any Mill or Mills used or any way employed in preparing or spinning of Wool or Cotton for the use of the Stocking Frame.
- Citation: 28 Geo. 3. c. 55
- Introduced by: D. P. Coke
- Territorial extent: Great Britain

Dates
- Royal assent: 25 June 1788
- Commencement: 27 November 1787 (Note: Start of session.)
- Repealed: 26 July 1889

Other legislation
- Amended by: Capital Punishments, etc. Act 1823; Statute Law Revision Act 1871; Statute Law Revision Act 1888
- Repealed by: Master and Servant Act 1889
- Relates to: Destruction of Stocking Frames, etc. Act 1812; Destruction of Stocking Frames, etc. Act 1813; Destroying Stocking Frames, etc. Act 1817

Status: Repealed

Text of statute as originally enacted

The Protection of Stocking Frames, etc. Act 1788 (28 Geo. 3. c. 55) was an act of the Parliament of Great Britain passed in 1788 and aimed at increasing the penalties for the deliberate disruption of the activity of mechanical knitting machines (stocking frames).

== Contents ==
Section one of the act made failure to return frames that had been hired from their owner punishable with a fine, whilst section two made unlawfully disposing of hired frames punishable with imprisonment, and section three made the purchaser equally culpable if he or she knew the frames were not the property of the seller. The final (and most strongly worded) section of the act, section four, made the outright destruction of the frames a felony punishable by 7 to 14 years transportation. The act also included the same penalty for entering by force with the intent to destroy frames or their associated paraphernalia. It was established in later case law that theft of items integral to the correct functioning of the machines (even if they were not damaged) was sufficient to meet the threshold for the act.

The act described itself as a response to the malicious theft of frames, and the propensity for "discontents ... and other disorderly persons [to] have assembled in a riotous and tumultuous manner and have destroyed or materially damaged great numbers of stocking frames". Daniel Coke, Member of Parliament for Nottingham, spoke on behalf of the bill in the Commons, citing disturbances in the town and pointing to previous legislation aimed at similar disruption in the wool trade. Coke originally proposed that machine-breaking carry the death penalty, but was later forced to abandon this, seeing the request "overwhelmingly rejected" by Parliament. The act was eventually passed and received royal assent on 25 June 1788.

== Significance ==
Later acts, such as the Destruction of Stocking Frames, etc. Act 1812 (52 Geo. 3. c. 16), temporarily allowed judges to administer the death penalty for the crime of damaging frames, citing the "ineffectual" nature of the lesser punishments set out in section four of the 1788 act. Section four of the 1788 act was officially repealed by the Capital Punishments, etc. Act 1823 (4 Geo. 4. c. 46), which, whilst not removing the possibility of transportation, gave judges additional room to sentence offenders to alternative punishments such as imprisonment.

== Subsequent developments ==
Section 4 of the act was repealed by section 1 of, and the schedule to, the Statute Law Revision Act 1871 (34 & 35 Vict. c. 116), which came into force on 21 August 1871.

The whole act was repealed by section 2 of, and the schedule to, the Master and Servant Act 1889 (52 & 53 Vict. c. 24), which came into force on 26 July 1889.

== See also ==
- UK labour law
- Luddite
