= Master and Servant Act 1889 =

Act of the Parliament of the United Kingdom

Master and Servant Act 1889 (Note: Section 1.)
- Act of Parliament
- Parliament of the United Kingdom
- Long title: An Act to repeal certain Statutes, relating to Master and Servants in particular Manufactures, which have ceased to be put in force or have become unnecessary by the enactment of subsequent Statutes.
- Citation: 52 & 53 Vict. c. 24
- Introduced by: George Howell MP (Commons)
- Territorial extent: England and Wales (Note: Section 2.)

Dates
- Royal assent: 26 July 1889
- Commencement: 26 July 1889 (Note: The Acts of Parliament (Commencement) Act 1793.)
- Repealed: 16 June 1977
Other legislation
Amends	See § Repealed enactments
Repeals/revokes	See § Repealed enactments
Amended by	Statute Law Revision Act 1908
Repealed by	United Kingdom: Statute Law (Repeals) Act 1977; Ireland: Statute Law Revision Act 2007
Relates to	Repeal of Obsolete Statutes Act 1856; Statute Law Revision Act

Status: Repealed

History of passage through Parliament

Records of Parliamentary debate relating to the statute from Hansard

Text of statute as originally enacted

The Master and Servant Act 1889 (52 & 53 Vict. c. 24) was an act of the Parliament of the United Kingdom that repealed for the United Kingdom enactments relating to master and servants from 1702 to 1811 which had ceased to be in force or had become necessary.

== Background ==
In the United Kingdom, acts of Parliament remain in force until expressly repealed. Blackstone's Commentaries on the Laws of England, published in the late 18th-century, raised questions about the system and structure of the common law and the poor drafting and disorder of the existing statute book.

In 1806, the Commission on Public Records passed a resolution requesting the production of a report on the best mode of reducing the volume of the statute book. From 1810 to 1825, The Statutes of the Realm was published, providing for the first time the authoritative collection of acts. In 1816, both Houses of Parliament, passed resolutions that an eminent lawyer with 20 clerks be commissioned to make a digest of the statutes, which was declared "very expedient to be done." However, this was never done.

At the start of the parliamentary session in 1853, Lord Cranworth announced his intention to the improvement of the statute law and in March 1853, appointed the Board for the Revision of the Statute Law to repeal expired statutes and continue consolidation, with a wider remit that included civil law. The Board issued three reports, recommending the creation of a permanent body for statute law reform.

In 1854, Lord Cranworth appointed the Royal Commission for Consolidating the Statute Law to consolidate existing statutes and enactments of English law. The Commission made four reports.

An alternative approach, focusing on expunging obsolete laws from the statute book, followed by consolidation, was proposed by Peter Locke King MP, who was heavily critical of the expenditure of the Commission and the lack of results. This approach was taken by the Repeal of Obsolete Statutes Act 1856 (19 & 20 Vict. c. 64), considered to be the first Statute Law Revision Act.

On 17 February 1860, the Attorney General, Sir Richard Bethell told the House of Commons that he had engaged Sir Francis Reilly and A. J. Wood to expurgate the statute book of all acts which, though not expressly repealed, were not in force, working backwards from the present time.

Previous statute law revision acts
Year passed	Title	Citation	Effect
1861	Statute Law Revision Act 1861	24 & 25 Vict. c. 101	Repealed or amended over 800 enactments
1863	Statute Law Revision Act 1863	26 & 27 Vict. c. 125	Repealed or amended over 1,600 enactments for England and Wales
1867	Statute Law Revision Act 1867	30 & 31 Vict. c. 59	Repealed or amended over 1,380 enactments
1870	Statute Law Revision Act 1870	33 & 34 Vict. c. 69	Repealed or amended over 250 enactments
1871	Promissory Oaths Act 1871	34 & 35 Vict. c. 48	Repealed or amended almost 200 enactments
1871	Statute Law Revision Act 1871	34 & 35 Vict. c. 116	Repealed or amended over 1,060 enactments
1872	Statute Law Revision Act 1872	35 & 36 Vict. c. 63	Repealed or amended almost 490 enactments
1872	Statute Law (Ireland) Revision Act 1872	35 & 36 Vict. c. 98	Repealed or amended over 1,050 enactments
1872	Statute Law Revision Act 1872 (No. 2)	35 & 36 Vict. c. 97	Repealed or amended almost 260 enactments
1873	Statute Law Revision Act 1873	36 & 37 Vict. c. 91	Repealed or amended 1,225 enactments
1874	Statute Law Revision Act 1874	37 & 38 Vict. c. 35	Repealed or amended over 490 enactments
1874	Statute Law Revision Act 1874 (No. 2)	37 & 38 Vict. c. 96	Repealed or amended almost 470 enactments
1875	Statute Law Revision Act 1875	38 & 39 Vict. c. 66	Repealed or amended over 1,400 enactments
1876	Statute Law Revision (Substituted Enactments) Act 1876	39 & 40 Vict. c. 20	Updated references to repealed acts
1878	Statute Law Revision (Ireland) Act 1878	41 & 42 Vict. c. 57	Repealed or amended over 460 enactments passed by the Parliament of Ireland
1878	Statute Law Revision Act 1878	41 & 42 Vict. c. 79	Repealed or amended over 90 enactments.
1879	Statute Law Revision (Ireland) Act 1879	42 & 43 Vict. c. 24	Repealed or amended over 460 enactments passed by the Parliament of Ireland
1879	Civil Procedure Acts Repeal Act 1879	42 & 43 Vict. c. 59	Repealed or amended over 130 enactments
1881	Statute Law Revision and Civil Procedure Act 1881	44 & 45 Vict. c. 59	Repealed or amended or amended almost 100 enactments relating to civil procedure.
1883	Statute Law Revision Act 1883	46 & 47 Vict. c. 39	Repealed or amended over 475 enactments
1883	Statute Law Revision and Civil Procedure Act 1883	46 & 47 Vict. c. 49	Repealed or amended over 475 enactments
1887	Statute Law Revision Act 1887	50 & 51 Vict. c. 59	Repealed or amended over 200 enactments
1887	Sheriffs Act 1887	50 & 51 Vict. c. 55	Repealed or amended almost 75 enactments related to sheriffs
1887	Coroners Act 1887	50 & 51 Vict. c. 71	Repealed or amended over 30 enactments related to coroners
1888	Statute Law Revision Act 1888	51 & 52 Vict. c. 3	Repealed or amended 620 enactments
1888	Statute Law Revision (No. 2) Act 1888	51 & 52 Vict. c. 57	Repealed or amended over 240 enactments

== Passage ==
Leave to bring in the Master and Servant Bill was granted to George Howell MP, Sir Henry James MP, A. J. Mundella MP, William Hunter MP, Charles Bradlaugh MP, T. M. Healy MP, Henry Hoyle Howorth MP, and Charles Fenwick MP on 1 May 1889. The bill had its first reading in the House of Commons on 1 May 1889, presented by George Howell MP. The bill had its second reading in the House of Commons on 15 May 1889, and was unopposed by the government. The bill was committed to a committee of the whole house, which met on 22 May 1889 and 29 May 1889 and reported on 19 June 1889, with amendments. The amended bill had its third reading in the House of Commons on 19 June 1889 and passed, without amendments.

The bill had its first reading in the House of Lords on 20 June 1889. The bill had its second reading in the House of Lords on 5 July 1889 and was committed to the Standing Committee for Bills relating to Law, &c. which reported on 16 July 1889, without amendments. The bill was committed to a committee of the whole house, which met and reported on 22 July 1889, without amendments. The bill had its third reading in the House of Lords on 23 July 1889 and passed, without amendments.

The bill was granted royal assent on 26 July 1889.

== Subsequent developments ==
The schedule to the act was repealed by section 1 of, and the schedule to, the Statute Law Revision Act 1908 (8 Edw. 7. c. 49)), which came into force on 21 December 1908.

The whole act was repealed for the United Kingdom by section 1(1) of, and part XIX of schedule 1 to, the Statute Law (Repeals) Act 1977, which came into force on 16 June 1977.

The whole act was repealed for the Republic of Ireland by sections 2(1) and 3(1) of, and part 4 of schedule 2 to, the Statute Law Revision Act 2007, which came into force on 8 May 2007.

== Repealed enactments ==
Section 2 of the act repealed 22 enactments, listed in the schedule to the act. Section 2 of the act included several safeguards to ensure that previously repealed enactments that had been confirmed, revived or perpetuated by the repealed acts would remain unaffected, enactments that had incorporated or referenced the repealed acts would remain valid, existing rights, obligations, liabilities, and legal proceedings would be preserved and the repeal would not affect any enactments in force in Her Majesty's dominions outside the United Kingdom.

Citation	Short title	Title	Extent of repeal
1 Ann. St. 2. c. 22 (Note: These references are to the Statutes Revised.)	Woollen Manufactures Act 1702	An Act for the more effectual preventing the Abuses and Frauds of persons employed in the working up the Woollen, Linen, Fustian, Cotton, and Iron Manufactures of this Kingdom.	The whole act.
2 Geo. 1. c. 17 (I)	Servants Act 1715	An Act to empower Justices of the Peace to determine disputes about Servants, Artificers, Day Labourers, Wages, and other small Demands, and to oblige Masters to pay the same, and to punish idle and Disorderly Servants.	Sections two, nine, and sixteen
9 Geo. 1. c. 27	Frauds by Journeymen Shoemakers Act 1722	An Act for preventing Journeymen Shoemakers selling, exchanging, or pawning Boots, Shoes, Slippers, Cut Leather, or other Materials for making Boots, Shoes, or Slippers, and for better regulating the said journeymen.	The whole act.
12 Geo. 1. c. 34	Woollen Manufactures Act 1725	An Act to prevent unlawful Combinations of Workmen employed in the Woollen Manufactures, and for better Payment of their Wages.	The whole act.
13 Geo. 1. c. 26	Linen and Hempen Manufactures (Scotland) Act 1726	An Act for better Regulation of the Linen and Hempen Manufactures in that Part of Great Britain called Scotland.	Except section eighteen
13 Geo. 2. c. 8	Frauds of Workmen Act 1739	An Act to explain and amend an Act made in the First Year of the Reign of her late Majesty Queen Anne, intituled "An Act for the more effectual preventing the Abuses and Frauds of Persons employed in the working up the Woollen, Linen, Iron, and Leather Manufactures of this Kingdom," and for extending the said Act to the Manufacture of Leather.	The whole act.
15 Geo. 2. c. 27	Thefts of Cloth, etc. Act 1741	An Act for the more effectual preventing any Cloth or Woollen Goods remaining upon the Rack or Tenters, or any Woollen Yarn or wooll left out to dry, from being stolen or taken away in the Night-time.	The whole act.
25 Geo. 2. c. 8 (I)	Apprentices Act 1751	An Act for the better adjusting and more easy recovery of the Wages of certain Servants, and for the better regulation of such Servants and of certain Apprentices; and for the better regulation of Coal-owners and their Agents as shall knowingly employ such at Work their Persons retained in the service of other Coal-owners; and also that Mutual Debts between Party and Party to be set one against the other.	Sections two and seven
27 Geo. 2. c. 7	Frauds in Manufacture of Clocks, etc. Act 1754	An Act for the more effectual preventing of Frauds and Abuses committed by persons employed in the Manufacture of Clocks and Watches.	The whole act.
29 Geo. 2. c. 12	N/A	An Act to prevent unlawful combinations of Tenants, Colliers, Miners, and others; and the sending of threatening Letters without Name, or with Fictitious Names subscribed thereto; and the malicious tearing down of Cross-ways Signs for the more effectual punishment of wicked Persons who shall maliciously set fire to Houses or Out-houses, or to Stacks of Hay, Corn, Straw, or Turf, or to Ships or Boats.	Sections nine, ten, eleven, and twelve.
30 Geo. 2. c. 12	Woollen Manufactures Act 1757	An Act to amend an Act made in the Twenty-ninth Year of the Reign of his present Majesty, intituled "An Act to render more effectual an Act passed in the George, to prevent unlawful Combinations of Workmen employed in the Woollen Manufactures, and for better Payment of their Wages; and also an Act passed in the Thirteenth year of the Reign of His said late Majesty, for the better Regulation of the Woollen Trade, and for preventing Disputes among Persons concerned therein," and limiting a Time for prosecuting for the Forfeiture appointed by the aforesaid Act in case of Payment of the Workmen's Wages in any other Manner than in Money.	The whole act.
5 Geo. 3. c. 51	Cloth Manufacture, Yorkshire Act 1765	An Act for repealing several Laws relating to the Manufacture of Woollen Cloth in the County of York, and also so much of several other laws as prescribes particular Standards of Width and Length of such Woollen Cloths; and for substituting other Regulations of the Cloth Trade within the West Riding of the said County, for preventing Frauds in certifying the Contents of the Cloth, and for preserving the Credit of the said Manufactures at the Foreign Market.	The whole act.
6 Geo. 3. c. 23	Cloth Manufacture, Yorkshire Act 1766	An Act to amend an Act made in the last Session of Parliament, intituled "An Act for repealing several Laws relating to the Manufacture of Woollen Cloth in the County of York, and also so much of several other laws as prescribes particular Standards of Width and Length of such Woollen Cloths; and for substituting other Regulations of the Cloth Trade within the West Riding of the said County, for preventing Frauds in certifying the Contents of the Cloth, and for preserving the Credit of the said Manufactures at the Foreign Market."	The whole act.
14 Geo. 3. c. 25	Frauds, etc., in Woollen Manufacturers Act 1774	An Act for the more effectual preventing Frauds and Embezzlements by Persons employed in the Woollen Manufactory.	The whole act.
14 Geo. 3. c. 44	Reeling False or Short Yarn Act 1774	An Act to amend an Act made in the Twenty-second year of the Reign of his late Majesty King George the Second, intituled "An Act for the more effectual preventing of Frauds and Abuses committed by Persons employed in the Manufacture of Hats, and in the Woollen, Linen, Fustian, Cotton, Iron, Leather, Fur, Hemp, Flax, Mohair, and Silk Manufactures; and for preventing unlawful Combinations of Journeymen Dyers and Journeymen Hot Pressers, and all other Persons employed in the said several Manufactures, and for the better Payment of their Wages."	The whole act.
17 Geo. 3. c. 55	Manufacture of Hats Act 1776	An Act for the better regulating the Hat Manufactory.	The whole act.
23 Geo. 3. c. 15	Dyeing Trade (Frauds) Act 1783	An Act for rendering more effectual the Provisions contained in an Act of the Thirteenth Year of King George the First for preventing Frauds and Abuses in the Dying Trade.	In part; namely, sections five to twelve, and section thirteen from "directed to any constable" to end of section
24 Geo. 3. Sess. 2. c. 3	Woollen Manufactures, Suffolk Act 1784	An Act for more effectually preventing Frauds and Abuses committed by Persons employed in the Manufactures of combing Wool, Worsted Yarn, and Goods made from Worsted in the County of Suffolk.	The whole act.
25 Geo. 3. c. 40	Woollen, etc., Manufactures, Bedfordshire Act 1785	An Act for more effectually preventing Frauds and Abuses committed by Persons employed in the Manufactures of Combing Wool, Worsted Yarn, and Goods made from Worsted, in the Counties of Bedford, Huntingdon, Northampton, Leicester, Rutland, and Lincoln, and the Isle of Ely.	The whole act.
28 Geo. 3. c. 55	Protection of Stocking Frames, etc. Act 1788	An Act for the better and more effectual Protection of Stocking Frames, and the Machines or Engines annexed thereto or used therewith, and for the Punishment of Persons destroying or injuring of such Stocking Frames, Machines, or Engines, and the Framework-Knitted Pieces, Stockings, and other Articles and Goods used and made in the Hosiery or Framework-Knitted Manufactory, or breaking or destroying any Machinery contained in any Mill or Mills used or any way employed in preparing or spinning of Cotton for the Use of the Stocking Frame.	The whole act.
31 Geo. 3. c. 56	Woollen, etc., Manufactures, Norfolk Act 1791	An Act more effectually to prevent Abuses and Frauds committed by Persons employed in the Manufactures of combing Wool and Worsted Yarn in the County of Norfolk and City of Norwich and County of the said City.	The whole act.
51 Geo. 3. c. 41	Stealing of Linen, etc. Act 1811	An Act to repeal so much of an Act passed in the eighteenth year of the reign of King George the Second, intituled, "An Act for the more effectually preventing the stealing of Linen, Fustian, and Cotton Goods and Wares in Buildings, Fields, Grounds, and other Places used for printing, whitening, bleaching, or drying the same," as takes away the Benefit of Clergy from Persons stealing Cloth in Places therein mentioned; and for more effectually preventing such Felonies.	The whole act.

== See also ==
- Master and Servant Act
- Statute Law Revision Act
