= List of acts of the Parliament of Great Britain from 1788 =

This is a complete list of acts of the Parliament of Great Britain for the year 1788.

For acts passed until 1707, see the list of acts of the Parliament of England and the list of acts of the Parliament of Scotland. See also the list of acts of the Parliament of Ireland.

For acts passed from 1801 onwards, see the list of acts of the Parliament of the United Kingdom. For acts of the devolved parliaments and assemblies in the United Kingdom, see the list of acts of the Scottish Parliament, the list of acts of the Northern Ireland Assembly, and the list of acts and measures of Senedd Cymru; see also the list of acts of the Parliament of Northern Ireland.

The number shown after each act's title is its chapter number. Acts are cited using this number, preceded by the year(s) of the reign during which the relevant parliamentary session was held; thus the Union with Ireland Act 1800 is cited as "39 & 40 Geo. 3. c. 67", meaning the 67th act passed during the session that started in the 39th year of the reign of George III and which finished in the 40th year of that reign. Note that the modern convention is to use Arabic numerals in citations (thus "41 Geo. 3" rather than "41 Geo. III"). Acts of the last session of the Parliament of Great Britain and the first session of the Parliament of the United Kingdom are both cited as "41 Geo. 3".

Acts passed by the Parliament of Great Britain did not have a short title; however, some of these acts have subsequently been given a short title by acts of the Parliament of the United Kingdom (such as the Short Titles Act 1896).

Before the Acts of Parliament (Commencement) Act 1793 came into force on 8 April 1793, acts passed by the Parliament of Great Britain were deemed to have come into effect on the first day of the session in which they were passed. Because of this, the years given in the list below may in fact be the year before a particular act was passed.

== 28 Geo. 3 ==
The fifth session of the 16th Parliament of Great Britain, which met from 27 November 1787 until 11 July 1788.

This session was also traditionally cited as 28 G. 3.

=== Public acts ===
Short title	Citation	Royal assent
Long title
Malt Duties Act 1788 (repealed)	28 Geo. 3. c. 1	17 December 1787
An Act for continuing and granting to His Majesty certain Duties upon Malt, Mum, Cyder, and Perry, for the Service of the Year One thousand seven hundred and eighty-eight. (Repealed by Statute Law Revision Act 1871 (34 & 35 Vict. c. 116))
Land Tax Act 1788 (repealed)	28 Geo. 3. c. 2	17 December 1787
An Act for granting an Aid to His Majesty by a Land Tax, to be raised in Great Britain, for the Service of the Year One thousand seven hundred and eighty-eight. (Repealed by Statute Law Revision Act 1871 (34 & 35 Vict. c. 116))
Marine Mutiny Act 1788 (repealed)	28 Geo. 3. c. 3	17 December 1787
An Act for the Regulation of His Majesty's Marine Forces while on Shore. (Repealed by Statute Law Revision Act 1871 (34 & 35 Vict. c. 116))
Duty on Spirits Act 1788 (repealed)	28 Geo. 3. c. 4	21 February 1788
An Act for charging an additional Duty on Spirits, manufactured in Scotland, and imported into England. (Repealed by Statute Law Revision Act 1871 (34 & 35 Vict. c. 116))
Trade with America Act 1788 (repealed)	28 Geo. 3. c. 5	10 March 1788
An Act to continue the Laws now in Force for regulating the Trade between the Subjects of His Majesty's Dominions and the Inhabitants of the Territories belonging to the United States of America, so far as the same relate to the Trade and Commerce carried on between this Kingdom and the Inhabitants of the Countries belonging to the said United States. (Repealed by Statute Law Revision Act 1871 (34 & 35 Vict. c. 116))
Trade Act 1788 (repealed)	28 Geo. 3. c. 6	10 March 1788
An Act for regulating the Trade between the Subjects of His Majesty's Colonies and Plantations in North America and in the West India Islands, and the Countries belonging to the United States of America; and between His Majesty's said Subjects and the Foreign Islands in the West Indies. (Repealed by Trade Act 1822 (3 Geo. 4. c. 44))
Gold and Silver Thread Act 1788 (repealed)	28 Geo. 3. c. 7	20 March 1788
An Act to amend and render more effectual an Act made in the Fifteenth Year of His late Majesty King George the Second, intituled, "An Act to prevent the counterfeiting of Gold and Silver Lace, and for settling and adjusting the Proportions of fine Silver and Silk, and for the better making of Gold and Silver Thread." (Note: Gold and Silver Thread Act 1741 (15 Geo. 2. c. 20)) (Repealed by Hallmarking Act 1973 (c. 43))
East India Company Act 1788 (repealed)	28 Geo. 3. c. 8	20 March 1788
An Act for removing any Doubt respecting the Power of the Commissioners for the Affairs of India, to direct that the Expence of raising, transporting and maintaining such Troops as may be judged necessary for the Security of the British Territories and Possessions in the East Indies, should be defrayed out of the Revenues arising from the said Territories and Possessions; and for limiting the Application of the said Revenues in the Manner therein mentioned. (Repealed by Statute Law Revision Act 1872 (35 & 36 Vict. c. 63))
Warwick Bridge Act 1788	28 Geo. 3. c. 9	20 March 1788
An Act for enabling the Right Honourable George Earl Brooke and Earl of Warwick, to build a new Bridge over the River Avon, in the Borough of Warwick, and to open proper Roads and Ways thereto.
Clerkenwell Church Act 1788	28 Geo. 3. c. 10	20 March 1788
An Act for pulling down the Church of Saint James at Clerkenwell in the County of Middlesex, and for building a new Church; and making a new Church Yard or Cemetery in the said Parish, with convenient Avenues and Passages thereto.
Militia Pay Act 1788 (repealed)	28 Geo. 3. c. 11	8 May 1788
An Act for defraying the Charge of the Pay and Cloathing of the Militia in that Part of Great Britain called England, for One Year, beginning the Twenty-fifth Day of March One thousand seven hundred and eighty-eight. (Repealed by Statute Law Revision Act 1871 (34 & 35 Vict. c. 116))
Mutiny Act 1788 (repealed)	28 Geo. 3. c. 12	20 March 1788
An Act for punishing Mutiny and Desertion and for the better Payment of the Army and their Quarters. (Repealed by Statute Law Revision Act 1871 (34 & 35 Vict. c. 116))
Liverpool Improvement Act 1788 (repealed)	28 Geo. 3. c. 13	20 March 1788
An Act for enlarging and varying some of the Powers contained in certain Acts of Parliament, relating to the watching, lighting, and cleansing the Streets and other Places within the Town of Liverpool, and for removing and preventing Nuisances and Annoyances therein. (Repealed by Municipal Corporations Act 1835 (5 & 6 Will. 4. c. 76) and Liverpool Improvement Act 1842 (5 & 6 Vict. c. cvi))
North Kyme Drainage Act 1788 (repealed)	28 Geo. 3. c. 14	20 March 1788
An Act for more effectually draining and preserving certain Fen Lands and Low Grounds, in the Manor or Township of North Kyme in the County of Lincoln. (Repealed by Lincolnshire Drainage Act 1840 (3 & 4 Vict. c. xc))
South Shields Water Act 1788 (repealed)	28 Geo. 3. c. 15	8 May 1788
An Act for supplying with Water the Town of South Shields, and Parts adjacent, and the Shipping resorting to the said Town. (Repealed by Sunderland and South Shields Waterworks Act 1852 (15 & 16 Vict. c. xxvii))
Exportation Act 1788 (repealed)	28 Geo. 3. c. 16	8 May 1788
An Act for repealing an Act made in the Second and Third Years of the Reign of King Edward the Sixth, intituled, "An Act against carrying of White Ashes out of the Realm." (Note: Exportation Act 1548 (2 & 3 Edw. 6. c. 26)) (Repealed by Statute Law Revision Act 1871 (34 & 35 Vict. c. 116))
Manufacture of Ounce Thread Act 1788 (repealed)	28 Geo. 3. c. 17	8 May 1788
An Act for the better Regulation of the Manufacture of Ounce Thread. (Repealed by Ounce Thread Manufacture Act 1827 (7 & 8 Geo. 4. c. 9))
Loans or Exchequer Bills Act 1788 (repealed)	28 Geo. 3. c. 18	11 June 1788
An Act for raising a certain Sum of Money by Loans or Exchequer Bills for the Service of the Year One thousand seven hundred and eighty eight. (Repealed by Statute Law Revision Act 1871 (34 & 35 Vict. c. 116))
Loans or Exchequer Bills (No. 2) Act 1788 (repealed)	28 Geo. 3. c. 19	11 June 1788
An Act for raising a further Sum of Money by Loans or Exchequer Bills for the Service of the Year One thousand seven hundred and eighty-eight. (Repealed by Statute Law Revision Act 1871 (34 & 35 Vict. c. 116))
Southern Whale Fishery Act 1788 (repealed)	28 Geo. 3. c. 20	11 June 1788
An Act for amending an Act made in the Twenty-sixth Year of His present Majesty's Reign, (Note: Southern Whale Fishery Act 1786 (26 Geo. 3. c. 50)) for the Encouragement of the Southern Whale Fishery, and for making further Provisions for that Purpose. (Repealed by Southern Whale Fisheries Act 1795 (35 Geo. 3. c. 92))
Lottery Act 1788 (repealed)	28 Geo. 3. c. 21	11 June 1788
An Act for granting to His Majesty a certain Sum of Money to be raised by a Lottery. (Repealed by Statute Law Revision Act 1871 (34 & 35 Vict. c. 116))
Indemnity Act 1788 (repealed)	28 Geo. 3. c. 22	11 June 1788
An Act to indemnify such Persons as have omitted to qualify themselves for Offices and Employments; and to indemnify Justices of the Peace or others who have omitted to register or deliver in their Qualifications within the Time limited by Law, and for giving further Time for those Purposes; and to indemnify Members and Officers in Cities, Corporations, and Borough Towns, whose Admissions have been omitted to be stamped according to Law, or having been stamped, have been lost or mislaid; and for allowing them Time to provide Admissions duly stamped; to give further Time to such Persons as have omitted to make and file Affidavits of the Execution of Indentures of Clerks to Attornies and Solicitors, or to pay the Duties on the Indentures and Contracts of Clerks, Apprentices, or Servants; and for indemnifying Deputy Lieutenants and Officers of the Militia, who have neglected to transmit Descriptions of their Qualifications to the Clerks of the Peace within the Time limited by Law, and for giving further Time for that Purpose. (Repealed by Promissory Oaths Act 1871 (34 & 35 Vict. c. 48))
Continuance of Laws Act 1788 (repealed)	28 Geo. 3. c. 23	11 June 1788
An Act to continue several Laws relating to the clandestine Running of uncustomed Goods, and preventing Frauds relating to the Customs; to the encouraging the Growth of Coffee in His Majesty's Plantations in America; to the further Punishment of Persons going armed or disguised in Defiance of the Laws of Customs or Excise; to the more effectually encouraging the Manufactures of Flax and Cotton in Great Britain; to the allowing the Exportation of certain Quantities of Wheat and other Articles to His Majesty's Sugar Colonies in America; to the permitting the Exportation of Tobacco Pipe Clay from this Kingdom, to the British Sugar Colonies or Plantations in the West Indies; to the prohibiting the Exportation of Tools and Utensils made use of in the Iron and Steel Manufactures of this Kingdom, and to prevent the seducing of Artificers and Workmen employed in those Manufactures, to go into Parts beyond the Seas; and to the preventing the clandestine Running of Goods, and the Danger of Infection thereby; and to revive and continue several Laws relating to the allowing a Drawback of the Duties on Rum shipped as Stores to be consumed on board Merchant Ships on their Voyages; and to the ascertaining the Strength of Spirits by Clarke's Hydrometer. (Repealed by Statute Law Revision Act 1871 (34 & 35 Vict. c. 116))
Continuance of Laws (No. 2) Act 1788 (repealed)	28 Geo. 3. c. 24	11 June 1788
An Act to continue several Laws relating to the granting a Bounty on the Exportation of certain Species of British and Irish Linens exported, and taking off the Duties on the Importation of Foreign Raw Linen Yarns made of Flax, and to the preventing the committing of Frauds by Bankrupts, and for continuing and amending several Laws relating to the Imprisonment and Transportation of Offenders. (Repealed by Statute Law Revision Act 1871 (34 & 35 Vict. c. 116))
Erection of Lighthouses Act 1788 (repealed)	28 Geo. 3. c. 25	11 June 1788
An Act to render more effectual an Act passed in the Twenty-sixth Year of His present Majesty's Reign, intituled, "An Act for erecting certain Light Houses in the Northern Parts of Great Britain." (Note: Erection of Lighthouses Act 1786 (26 Geo. 3. c. 101)) (Repealed by Merchant Shipping Repeal Act 1854 (17 & 18 Vict. c. 120))
Appropriation Act 1788 (repealed)	28 Geo. 3. c. 26	11 June 1788
An Act for granting to His Majesty a certain Sum of Money out of the Consolidated Fund; and for applying certain Monies therein mentioned for the Service of the Year One thousand seven hundred and eighty-eight; and for further appropriating the Supplies granted in this Session of Parliament. (Repealed by Statute Law Revision Act 1871 (34 & 35 Vict. c. 116))
Customs Act 1788 (repealed)	28 Geo. 3. c. 27	11 June 1788
An Act for reducing the Duties on the Importation of certain Goods, Wares, and Merchandize, the Growth, Produce, or Manufacture of any of the European Dominions of the States General of the United Provinces, into this Kingdom. (Repealed by Statute Law Revision Act 1861 (24 & 25 Vict. c. 101))
Stamp Duties Act 1788 (repealed)	28 Geo. 3. c. 28	11 June 1788
An Act to exempt certain Licences granted to Stipendiary Curates from Stamp Duties. (Repealed by Statute Law Revision Act 1861 (24 & 25 Vict. c. 101))
East India Company (Money) Act 1788 or the East India Company Act 1788 (repealed)	28 Geo. 3. c. 29	11 June 1788
An Act to enable the East India Company to borrow a further Sum of Money upon Bond. (Repealed by East India Loans Act 1937 (1 Edw. 8 & 1 Geo. 6. c. 14))
Theatrical Representations Act 1788 (repealed)	28 Geo. 3. c. 30	11 June 1788
An Act to enable Justices of the Peace to license Theatrical Representations occasionally, under the Restrictions therein contained. (Repealed by Theatres Act 1843 (6 & 7 Vict. c. 68))
Losses from Cession of East Florida Act 1788 (repealed)	28 Geo. 3. c. 31	11 June 1788
An Act for appointing Commissioners further to enquire into the Losses of all such Persons who have suffered in their Properties in consequence of the Cession of the Province of East Florida to the King of Spain. (Repealed by Statute Law Revision Act 1871 (34 & 35 Vict. c. 116))
Discharge of a Crown Debt Act 1788 (repealed)	28 Geo. 3. c. 32	11 June 1788
An Act for vesting the Estates of Edward Henvill in Trustees to be sold, and for applying the Money arising by the Sale thereof in Discharge of a Debt owing by him to the Crown. (Repealed by Statute Law Revision Act 1948 (11 & 12 Geo. 6. c. 62))
Customs (No. 2) Act 1788 (repealed)	28 Geo. 3. c. 33	11 June 1788
An Act more effectually to secure the Performance of Quarantine, and for amending several Laws relating to the Revenue of Customs. (Repealed by Statute Law Revision Act 1861 (24 & 25 Vict. c. 101))
Quarantine and Customs Act 1788 (repealed)	28 Geo. 3. c. 34	11 June 1788
An Act to repeal the Duties and Drawbacks of Customs and Excise, payable on the Importation and Exportation of Wine (except Wine the Produce of the European Dominions of the French King, Rhenish, German, and Hungary Wine, Portugal and Madeira Wine, and Wine of the Produce of Spain, or of any of the Dominions of the King of Spain) and for granting other Duties and Drawbacks in lieu thereof; to repeal the Duty of Excise upon Foreign Green Glass Bottles imported, and for charging an additional Duty of Customs in lieu thereof; for ascertaining the Duty on Carriages the Manufacture of the European Dominions of the French King, imported directly from thence; for obviating a Doubt with respect to the Duties on White Woollen Cloths exported; and for reserving to His Majesty the Hereditary and other Revenues of the Crown in Scotland. (Repealed by Statute Law Revision Act 1861 (24 & 25 Vict. c. 101))
Newfoundland Fisheries Act 1788 (repealed)	28 Geo. 3. c. 35	11 June 1788
An Act to enable His Majesty to make such Regulations as may be necessary to prevent the Inconvenience which might arise from the Competition of His Majesty's Subjects and those of the Most Christian King, (Note: "The Most Christian King" was a traditional title of the King of France.) in carrying on the Fishery on the Coasts of the Island of Newfoundland. (Repealed by Statute Law Revision Act 1871 (34 & 35 Vict. c. 116))
County Elections Act 1788 (repealed)	28 Geo. 3. c. 36	25 June 1788
An Act for the better securing the Rights of Persons qualified to vote at County Elections. (Repealed by County Elections (No. 2) Act 1789 (29 Geo. 3. c. 18))
Excise Act 1788 or the Weights and Measures Act 1788 (repealed)	28 Geo. 3. c. 37	25 June 1788
An Act for repealing the Duties on Buck or Deer Skins undressed, Buck or Deer Skins, Indian half-dressed, and Elk Skins undressed, imported, and on Hides and Skins dressed in Oil in this Kingdom, and for granting other Duties in lieu thereof; for laying a Duty on Stuffs printed, painted, stained, or dyed in Great Britain, allowing Deer and other Skins, the Produce of Florida, to be sold by Auction, free from the Duty charged on such Sales; for amending several Laws relative to the Revenue of Excise, and to prevent the Sale of Sweets for Consumption in the Houses of Retailers thereof, who shall not have Licences to sell Beer or Ale. (Repealed by Revenue Act 1889 (52 & 53 Vict. c. 42))
Exportation (No. 2) Act 1788 (repealed)	28 Geo. 3. c. 38	25 June 1788
An Act to explain, amend, and reduce into one Act of Parliament, several Laws now in being for preventing the Exportation of live Sheep, Rams, and Lambs, Wool, Woolfels, Mortlings, Shortlings, Yarn, and Worsted, Cruels, Coverlids, Waddings, and other Manufactures, or pretended Manufactures, made of Wool slightly wrought up, or otherwise put together, so as the same may be reduced to and made use of as Wool again, Mattrasses or Beds stuffed with combed Wool, or Wool fit for combing, Fullers Earth, Fulling Clay, and Tobacco Pipe Clay, from this Kingdom, and from the Isles of Jersey, Guernsey, Alderney, Sark, and Man, into Foreign Parts; and for rendering more effectual an Act passed in the Twenty-third Year of the Reign of King Henry the Eighth, intituled, "An Act for the winding of Wool." (Note: Winding of Wool Act 1531 (23 Hen. 8. c. 17)) (Repealed by Statute Law Revision Act 1861 (24 & 25 Vict. c. 101))
Importation Act 1788 (repealed)	28 Geo. 3. c. 39	25 June 1788
An Act to allow the Importation of Rum, or other Spirits, from His Majesty's Colonies or Plantations in the West Indies, into the Province of Quebec, without Payment of Duty, under certain Conditions and Restrictions. (Repealed by Trade Act 1822 (3 Geo. 4. c. 44))
Compensation to American Loyalists, etc. Act 1788 (repealed)	28 Geo. 3. c. 40	4 July 1788
An Act for giving Relief to such Persons as have suffered in their Rights and Properties during the late unhappy Dissentions in America, in consequence of their Loyalty to His Majesty and Attachment to the British Government, and for making Compensation to such Persons as have suffered in their Properties in consequence of the Cession of the Province of East Florida to the King of Spain. (Repealed by Statute Law Revision Act 1871 (34 & 35 Vict. c. 116))
Annuity to Duke of Saint Albans Act 1788 (repealed)	28 Geo. 3. c. 41	4 July 1788
An Act to enable His Majesty to grant a certain Annuity to the Most Noble Aubrey Duke of Saint Alban's. (Repealed by Statute Law Revision Act 1871 (34 & 35 Vict. c. 116))
Annuity to Family of Sir Guy Carlton Act 1788 (repealed)	28 Geo. 3. c. 42	4 July 1788
An Act for obviating a Doubt in an Act made in the Twenty-sixth Year of the Reign of His present Majesty, intituled, "An Act for settling and securing a certain Annuity for the Use of Lady Maria Carlton, Wife of Sir Guy Carlton, Knight of the Most Honourable Order of the Bath, and Guy Carlton, and Thomas Carlton, Sons of the said Sir Guy Carlton, in Consideration of the eminent Services performed by him to His Majesty and this Country." (Note: Annuity to Lady Maria Carlton Act 1786 (26 Geo. 3. c. 88)) (Repealed by Statute Law Revision Act 1871 (34 & 35 Vict. c. 116))
Annuity to Brook Watson, Esquire Act 1788 (repealed)	28 Geo. 3. c. 43	4 July 1788
An Act for obviating a Doubt in an Act made in the Twenty-sixth Year of the Reign of His present Majesty, intituled, "An Act to enable His Majesty to grant a certain Annuity to Brook Watson Esquire, late Commissary General in North America, in Consideration of his diligent and meritorious Services in that Office." (Note: Annuity to Brook Watson, Esquire Act 1786 (26 Geo. 3. c. 93)) (Repealed by Statute Law Revision Act 1871 (34 & 35 Vict. c. 116))
American Loyalists Act 1788 (repealed)	28 Geo. 3. c. 44	25 June 1788
An Act for appointing Commissioners further to enquire into the Losses and Services of all such Persons, who have suffered in their Rights, Properties, and Professions, during the late unhappy Dissentions in America, in consequence of their Loyalty to His Majesty, and Attachment to the British Government. (Repealed by Statute Law Revision Act 1871 (34 & 35 Vict. c. 116))
Exportation (No. 3) Act 1788 (repealed)	28 Geo. 3. c. 45	4 July 1788
An Act to prohibit for a limited Time the Exportation of Hay. (Repealed by Statute Law Revision Act 1871 (34 & 35 Vict. c. 116))
Excise (No. 2) Act 1788 (repealed)	28 Geo. 3. c. 46	4 July 1788
An Act for discontinuing for a limited Time, the several Duties payable in Scotland upon Low Wines and Spirits, and upon Worts, Wash, and other Liquors there used in the Distillation of Spirits, and for granting to His Majesty other Duties in lieu thereof; and for better regulating the Exportation of British made Spirits from England to Scotland, and from Scotland to England; and to continue for a limited Time an Act made in the Twenty-sixth Year of the Reign of His present Majesty, (Note: Excise (No. 3) Act 1786 (26 Geo. 3. c. 73)) to discontinue for a limited Time the Payment of the Duties upon Low Wines and Spirits for Home Consumption, and for granting and securing the due Payment of other Duties in lieu thereof; and for the better Regulation of the making and vending British Spirits; and for discontinuing for a limited Time certain Imposts and Duties upon Rum and Spirits imported from the West Indies. (Repealed by Statute Law Revision Act 1871 (34 & 35 Vict. c. 116))
Papists Act 1788 (repealed)	28 Geo. 3. c. 47	11 June 1788
An Act for allowing further Time for Enrolment of Deeds and Wills made by Papists, and for Relief of Protestant Purchasers. (Repealed by Statute Law Revision Act 1871 (34 & 35 Vict. c. 116))
Chimney Sweepers Act 1788 (repealed)	28 Geo. 3. c. 48	25 June 1788
An Act for the better Regulation of Chimney Sweepers, and their Apprentices. (Repealed by Statute Law Revision Act 1871 (34 & 35 Vict. c. 116))
Justices of the Peace Act 1788 (repealed)	28 Geo. 3. c. 49	4 July 1788
An Act to enable Justices of the Peace to act as such in certain Cases out of the Limits of the Counties in which they actually are. (Repealed by Statute Law Revision Act 1861 (24 & 25 Vict. c. 101))
Pawnbrokers Act 1788 (repealed)	28 Geo. 3. c. 50	4 July 1788
An Act to amend and continue for a limited Time an Act passed in the Twenty-seventh Year of the Reign of His present Majesty, intituled, "An Act for further regulating the Trade and Business of Pawnbrokers." (Note: Pawnbrokers Act 1787 (27 Geo. 3. c. 37)) (Repealed by Statute Law Revision Act 1871 (34 & 35 Vict. c. 116))
Thames Navigation Act 1788 (repealed)	28 Geo. 3. c. 51	11 June 1788
An Act to explain, amend, and enlarge the Powers of so much of Two Acts passed in the Eleventh (Note: Thames and Isis Navigation Act 1771 (11 Geo. 3. c. 45)) and Fifteenth (Note: Thames Conservancy Act 1775 (15 Geo. 3. c. 11)) Years of the Reign of His present Majesty, for improving and compleating the Navigation of the Rivers Thames and Isis, from the City of London to the Town of Cricklade in the County of Wilts, as relates to the Navigation of the said Rivers, from the Boundary of the Jurisdiction of the City of London, near Staines in the County of Middlesex, to the said Town of Cricklade. (Repealed by Thames Navigation (Milson's Point and Bell Weir Canal) Act 1812 (52 Geo. 3. c. xlvii) and Thames Conservancy Act 1894 (57 & 58 Vict. c. clxxxvii))
Controverted Elections Act 1788 (repealed)	28 Geo. 3. c. 52	4 July 1788
An Act for the further Regulation of the Trials of controverted Elections, or Returns of Members to serve in Parliament. (Repealed by Controverted Elections Act 1828 (9 Geo. 4. c. 22))
Coal Trade Act 1788 (repealed)	28 Geo. 3. c. 53	4 July 1788
An Act to indemnify and save harmless all Persons who may have incurred Penalties or Forfeitures under an Act passed in the Ninth Year of the Reign of Queen Anne, intituled, "An Act to dissolve the present, and prevent the future Combination of Coal Owners, Lightermen, Masters of Ships, and others, to advance the Price of Coals, in Prejudice of the Navigation, Trade, and Manufactures of this Kingdom; and for the further Encouragement of the Coal Trade;" (Note: Coal Trade Act 1710 (9 Ann. c. 30)) and also an Act passed in the Third Year of the Reign of His late Majesty King George the Second, intituled, "An Act for the better Regulation of the Coal Trade;" (Note: Coal Trade Act 1729 (3 Geo. 2. c. 26)) and for the better preventing of Combinations in the Trade of Coals. (Repealed by Statute Law Revision Act 1861 (24 & 25 Vict. c. 101))
Slave Trade Act 1788 or the Regulated Slave Trade Act 1788 or Dolben's Act (repealed)	28 Geo. 3. c. 54	11 July 1788
An Act to regulate, for a limited Time, the shipping and carrying Slaves in British Vessels from the Coast of Africa. (Repealed by Statute Law Revision Act 1871 (34 & 35 Vict. c. 116))
Protection of Stocking Frames, etc. Act 1788 (repealed)	28 Geo. 3. c. 55	25 June 1788
An Act for the better and more effectual Protection of Stocking Frames and the Machines or Engines annexed thereto, or used therewith, and for the Punishment of Persons destroying or injuring of such Stocking Frames, Machines, or Engines, and the Framework-knitted Pieces, Stockings, and other Articles and Goods used and made in the Hosiery or Frame-workknitted Manufactory, or breaking or destroying any Machinery contained in any Mill or Mills used or any Way employed in preparing or spinning of Wool or Cotton for the Use of the Stocking Frame. (Repealed by Master and Servant Act 1889 (52 & 53 Vict. c. 24))
Marine Insurance Act 1788 (repealed)	28 Geo. 3. c. 56	4 July 1788
An Act to repeal an Act made in the Twenty-fifth Year of the Reign of His present Majesty, intituled, "An Act for regulating Insurances on Ships, and on Goods, Merchandizes, or Effects," (Note: Insurances on Ships, etc. Act 1785 (25 Geo. 3. c. 44)) and for substituting other Provisions for the like Purpose in lieu thereof. (Repealed by Marine Insurance Act 1906 (6 Edw. 7. c. 41))
Stage Coaches Act 1788 (repealed)	28 Geo. 3. c. 57	25 June 1788
An Act for limiting the Number of Persons to be carried on the Outside of Stage Coaches or other Carriages. (Repealed by Stage Coaches, etc. (Great Britain) Act 1810 (50 Geo. 3. c. 48))
Leith Harbour Act 1788 (repealed)	28 Geo. 3. c. 58	8 May 1788
An Act for enlarging and improving the Harbour of Leith; for making a new Bason, Quays, Wharfs, or Docks; for building Warehouses; for making new Roads, and widening others leading to and from the said Harbour; and for empowering the Lord Provost, Magistrates, and Council of the City of Edinburgh, to purchase Lands, Houses, and Areas, and to borrow Money for these Purposes. (Repealed by Leith Harbour and Docks Act 1875 (38 & 39 Vict. c. clx))
Tyne Skippers and Keelmen (Relief Fund) Act 1788 (repealed)	28 Geo. 3. c. 59	11 June 1788
An Act for establishing a permanent Fund for the Relief and Support of Skippers and Keelmen employed on the River Tyne, who by Sickness or other accidental Misfortunes, or by old Age, shall not be able to maintain themselves and their Families; and also for the Relief of the Widows and Children of such Skippers and Keelmen. (Repealed by Statute Law Revision Act 1948 (11 & 12 Geo. 6. c. 62))
Christchurch, Middlesex Improvement Act 1788 (repealed)	28 Geo. 3. c. 60	11 June 1788
An Act to explain and amend an Act made in the Twelfth Year of the Reign of His present Majesty King George the Third, (Note: Christchurch, Middlesex Act 1772 (12 Geo. 3. c. 38)) for paving, cleansing, lighting, watching, and regulating the Squares, Streets, Rows, Lanes, Alleys, and other Public Passages and Places, within the Parish of Christ Church in Middlesex, and for removing Nuisances and Obstructions therefrom, and preventing the like for the future; and for paving and regulating such Parts of Brick Lane, as are not within the said Parish. (Repealed by Statute Law (Repeals) Act 2013 (c. 2))
Whitehaven Improvement Act 1788	28 Geo. 3. c. 61	4 July 1788
An Act for continuing an Act made in the Second Year of the Reign of His present Majesty, (Note: Whitehaven Improvement Act 1762 (2 Geo. 3. c. 87)) intituled, "An Act for enlarging the Term and Powers of several Acts of Parliament relating to the Harbour of Whitehaven in the County of Cumberland, and to the Roads leading to the said Harbour and Town of Whitehaven, and for further enlarging the said Harbour; and for lighting the said Town, and supplying the same with Water; and for regulating the Carmen there; and for repealing so much of an Act of the Twenty-third Year of the Reign of His late Majesty, (Note: Cumberland Roads Act 1749 (23 Geo. 2. c. 40)) as relates to the Road from Calder Bridge to Egremont, and directing how the said Road shall be repaired; and for repairing several other Roads therein-mentioned in the said County."
Saint Peter le Poor Parish Church Act 1788 (repealed)	28 Geo. 3. c. 62	11 June 1788
An Act for pulling down and re-building the Parish Church of Saint Peter-le-Poor, within the City of London, and for widening the Street adjacent. (Repealed by Statute Law (Repeals) Act 2013 (c. 2))
Charles Radcliffe's Estates Act 1788 (repealed)	28 Geo. 3. c. 63	4 July 1788
An Act for charging several Estates in the Counties of Northumberland, Cumberland, and Durham, settled upon the late Charles Radcliffe, deceased, for Life, with Remainder to his first and other Sons in Tail Male, with the Payment of a clear yearly Rent Charge of Two thousand five hundred Pounds, payable to the Grandson of the said Charles Radcliffe, the Right Honourable Anthony James Earl of Newburgh, and the Heirs Male of his Body to be begotten. (Repealed by Statute Law (Repeals) Act 1978 (c. 45))
Cambridge Improvement Act 1788 (repealed)	28 Geo. 3. c. 64	8 May 1788
An Act for the better paving, cleansing, and lighting the Town of Cambridge, for removing and preventing Obstructions and Annoyances, and for widening the Streets, Lanes, and other Passages within the said Town. (Repealed by Local Government Board's Provisional Orders Confirmation (No. 15) Act 1889 (52 & 53 Vict. c. cxvi))
Bristol Improvement Act 1788 (repealed)	28 Geo. 3. c. 65	11 June 1788
An Act for removing and preventing Encroachments, Obstructions, Annoyances, and other Nuisances, within the City of Bristol and the Liberties thereof; and for licensing and better regulating Hackney Coaches, Chairs, Waggons, Carts, and other Carriages, and the Owners, Drivers, and Carriers thereof respectively, and Porters and other Persons within, and for certain Distances round the said City and Liberties, and for better regulating the Shipping and Trade, and the Rivers, Wharfs, Backs, and Quays, and the Markets within the same City and Liberties, and for other Purposes. (Repealed by Bristol Encroachment Act 1837 (7 Will. 4 & 1 Vict. c. lxxxv))
Bristol Building Act 1788 (repealed)	28 Geo. 3. c. 66	11 June 1788
An Act for regulating Buildings and Party Walls, within the City of Bristol and the Liberties thereof. (Repealed by Bristol Improvement Act 1840 (3 & 4 Vict. c. lxxvii))
Bristol Guildhall, etc. Act 1788	28 Geo. 3. c. 67	11 June 1788
An Act for widening and rendering commodious a certain Street, called Broad Street, within the City of Bristol, and for enlarging the Council House and Guildhall of the said City, and providing Public Offices thereto, and Repositories for the Books, Papers, and Records of the said City.
Southwark Improvement Act 1788 (repealed)	28 Geo. 3. c. 68	11 June 1788
An Act for enabling the Commissioners for putting in Execution an Act made in the Sixth Year of the Reign of His present Majesty, (Note: Southwark Improvement Act 1766 (6 Geo. 3. c. 24)) for paving the Streets and Lanes within the Town and Borough of Southwark, and certain Places adjacent, in the County of Surrey, and for cleansing, lighting, and watching the same, and also the Courts, Yards, Alleys, and Passages adjoining thereto; and for preventing Annoyances therein, to open, widen, and better regulate the several Streets, Lanes, and Passages, within the East Division, in the said Act described. (Repealed by London Government (Borough of Bermondsey) Order in Council 1901 (SR&O 1901/264) and London Government (Borough of Southwark) Order in Council 1901 (SR&O 1901/275))
Inverness Gaol Act 1788	28 Geo. 3. c. 69	4 July 1788
An Act for taking down the present Court House and Gaol, and erecting and building a new Court House and Gaol in and for the Town and County of Inverness; and for appropriating the Sum of One thousand Pounds out of the unexhausted Balance or Surplus arising from the forfeited Estates in North Britain, towards erecting and building the same.
Deritend Bridge, Birmingham Rebuilding Act 1788	28 Geo. 3. c. 70	8 May 1788
An Act for rebuilding the Bridge over the River Rea at the Town of Birmingham, called Deritend Bridge, and widening the Avenues thereto, and for widening and varying the Course of the said River near the said Bridge, and making a Weir and other necessary Works to prevent the lower Part of the said Town from being overflowed.
Anglesea Drainage, etc. Act 1788	28 Geo. 3. c. 71	25 June 1788
An Act for dividing and enclosing the Marsh called Malldraeth and Corsddaugau in the County of Anglesey, and for embanking the said Marsh; and for making Cuts, Channels, and other Works, for draining and preserving the same, and for allowing the free Use of such Cuts or Channels, with Boats or other Vessels, upon the Payment of certain Rates, to be applied towards supporting the said Embankments and Works.
Flint Canal Act 1788	28 Geo. 3. c. 72	8 May 1788
An Act for making and maintaining a navigable Canal from Pentre Rock near the Town of Flint, to Greenfield in the County of Flint.
Shropshire Canal Act 1788	28 Geo. 3. c. 73	11 June 1788
An Act for making and maintaining a navigable Canal from the Canal at Donnington Wood in the County of Salop, to or near a Place called Southall Bank, and from thence by Two several Branches to communicate with the River Severn, one near Coalbrook Dale, and the other near Madeley Wood in the said County, and also certain Collateral Cuts to join such Canal.
Paddington Parish Church Act 1788	28 Geo. 3. c. 74	8 May 1788
An Act for rebuilding the Parish Church of Paddington in the County of Middlesex, and for enlarging the Church Yard of the said Parish.
Hertford Improvement Act 1788	28 Geo. 3. c. 75	8 May 1788
An Act for paving the Footways, and cleansing, lighting, and watching the Streets and other Public Passages and Places within the Borough of Hertford, and removing and preventing Obstructions, Nuisances, and Annoyances therein.
Exeter Poor Relief Act 1788 (repealed)	28 Geo. 3. c. 76	8 May 1788
An Act for raising further Sums of Money for the better Relief of the Poor of the City and County of the City of Exon, and to explain and amend an Act passed in the Twenty-fifth Year of the Reign of His present Majesty, (Note: Exeter (Poor Relief) Act 1785 (25 Geo. 3. c. 21)) for rendering more effectual several Acts of Parliament for erecting Hospitals and Workhouses within the said City and County, for the better employing and maintaining the Poor there. (Repealed by Local Government Board's Provisional Order Confirmation (No. 11) Act 1913 (3 & 4 Geo. 5. c. cxxxv))
Derby Bridge Act 1788	28 Geo. 3. c. 77	11 June 1788
An Act for re-building the Bridge over the River Derwent, at or near the Town and Borough of Derby, and for improving the Avenues or Approaches thereto.
Newcastle and Gateshead Bridge Act 1788	28 Geo. 3. c. 78	11 June 1788
An Act for enlarging the Terms and Powers of Two Acts of the Twelfth (Note: Tyne Bridge (No. 2) Act 1772 (12 Geo. 3. c. 100)) and Nineteenth (Note: Tyne Bridge Act 1779 (19 Geo. 3. c. 79)) Years of His present Majesty's Reign, made for building a temporary Bridge, and compleating a new Stone Bridge over the River Tyne, between the Town of Newcastle upon Tyne and Gateshead in the County of Durham, and making the Avenues to and the Passages over the same, more commodious; and for removing and preventing Nuisances and Annoyances in the Streets, Lanes, or Avenues leading to the said new Stone Bridge, within the Town of Gateshead in the County of Durham.
Taunton Improvement Act 1788	28 Geo. 3. c. 79	11 June 1788
An Act to enable Sir Benjamin Hammet Knight, to lay out and build a new Street, from Fore Street to the Church of Saint Mary Magdalen, within the Town of Taunton in the County of Somerset.
Sawley Ferry Bridge, Trent Act 1788 (repealed)	28 Geo. 3. c. 80	11 June 1788
An Act for building a Bridge over the River Trent, or at near Sawley Ferry in the Counties of Derby and Leicester. (Repealed by Cavendish, Harrington and Willington Bridges (Transfer) Act 1896 (59 & 60 Vict. c. xix))
Bolton Grammar School Act 1788	28 Geo. 3. c. 81 (Note: This act was given royal assent using the form of words used for a private act.)	8 May 1788
An Act for incorporating the Governors of the Free Grammar School of the Town and Parish of Bolton in the Moors in the County Palatine of Lancaster, of the Foundation of Robert Lever, late of London, Gentleman, deceased, and for enlarging the Trusts and Powers of the said Governors for the Benefit of the said School.
Chester Improvement Act 1788 (repealed)	28 Geo. 3. c. 82	11 June 1788
An Act for taking down and re-building the Gaol of the Castle of Chester, the Prothonotary's Office, the Exchequer Record Rooms, and other Offices and Buildings adjoining or near to the said Gaol, and for making proper Yards and Conveniences thereto. (Repealed by Statute Law (Repeals) Act 2008 (c. 12))
Saint Paul Covent Garden Church Rebuilding Act 1788 (repealed)	28 Geo. 3. c. 83	11 June 1788
An Act for repairing the Church of the Parish of Saint Paul, Covent Garden, in the County of Middlesex, for repairing and improving the Gates and Avenues leading to the said Church, and for removing the present Watch-House, and providing another for the Use of the said Parish. (Repealed by Parish of St. Paul Covent Garden Act 1829 (10 Geo. 4. c. lxviii) (Note: Incorrectly cited as "10 G 4 c xviii" in the Chronological Table of the Statutes.))
Dartford Roads Act 1788 (repealed)	28 Geo. 3. c. 84	21 February 1788
An Act for continuing the Term and varying the Powers of an Act of the Sixth Year of His present Majesty, (Note: Dartford Roads Act 1766 (6 Geo. 3. c. 98)) for repairing and widening several Roads leading to the Town of Dartford in the County of Kent. (Repealed by Dartford and Sevenoaks Road Act 1831 (1 Will. 4. c. viii) (Note: Incorrectly cited as "W 1 4 c viii" in the Chronological Table of the Statutes.))
Kent and Sussex Roads Act 1788 (repealed)	28 Geo. 3. c. 85	21 February 1788
An Act for continuing the Term, and varying the Powers of an Act of the Sixth Year of His present Majesty, (Note: Kent and Sussex Roads Act 1766 (6 Geo. 3. c. 56)) for repairing, widening, and keeping in Repair the Road leading from Tunbridge Wells in the County of Kent, to the Cross Ways near Maresfield Street in the County of Sussex; and for amending the Road from Florence Farm in the Parish of Withyham, to Forest Row in the Parish of East Grinstead in the County of Sussex. (Repealed by Roads from Tunbridge Wells and from Florence Farm Act 1831 (1 Will. 4. c. lxx))
Wiltshire Roads Act 1788 (repealed)	28 Geo. 3. c. 86	21 February 1788
An Act for amending, widening, and keeping in Repair the Road from the Bottom of Whitesheet Hill through Hurdcot, to the Wilton Turnpike Road at or near Barford in the County of Wilts. (Repealed by Whitesheet Hill and Barford Turnpike Road Act 1830 (11 Geo. 4 & 1 Will. 4. c. lxxxviii) (Note: Incorrectly cited as "11 G 4 & W 4 c lxxxviii" in the Chronological Table of the Statutes.))
Nottinghamshire and Derby Roads Act 1788 (repealed)	28 Geo. 3. c. 87	20 March 1788
An Act for reviving, continuing, and enlarging the Term and Powers of an Act made in the Fifth Year of the Reign of His present Majesty King George the Third, (Note: Notts and Derby Roads Act 1765 (5 Geo. 3. c. 90)) for repairing and widening the Road from the Alfreton Turnpike Road, near a Place called Little Robins in the Parish of Mansfield in the County of Nottingham, through Woolley Moor to the Nottingham Turnpike Road, near Tansley in the County of Derby, and from Woolley Moor to the Chesterfield Turnpike Road at Kelstidge in the said County of Derby. (Repealed by Road from Mansfield to the Nottingham Turnpike Road Act 1832 (2 & 3 Will. 4. c. xxxii))
Worcester and Warwick Roads Act 1788 (repealed)	28 Geo. 3. c. 88	10 March 1788
An Act for enlarging the Term and Powers of certain Acts of Parliament for repairing several Roads leading into and near the City of Worcester, and for repairing certain other Roads therein mentioned. (Repealed by Road from Northfield to the Wootton Turnpike Act 1809 (49 Geo. 3. c. xlvi) and Worcester (City) Roads Act 1816 (56 Geo. 3. c. xlvi))
Derby Roads Act 1788 (repealed)	28 Geo. 3. c. 89	20 March 1788
An Act for enlarging the Term and Powers of an Act passed in the Sixth Year of the Reign of His present Majesty King George the Third, (Note: Derby Roads (No. 3) Act 1766 (6 Geo. 3. c. 87)) for repairing and widening the Road from the Mansfield and Chesterfield Turnpike Road, near the Nine Mile Stone from Mansfield, through Temple Normanton, Tupton new Inclosure, and Birkin Lane, to Bunting Field Nook in the Parish of Ashover in the County of Derby. (Repealed by Road from the Mansfield and Chesterfield Turnpike Road and from Tupton Nether Green Act 1808 (48 Geo. 3. c. xxxviii) and Road from Temple Normanton and Road from Tupton Nether Green Act 1830 (11 Geo. 4 & 1 Will. 4. c. xci))
Catterick Bridge to Durham Road Act 1788 (repealed)	28 Geo. 3. c. 90	20 March 1788
An Act for enlarging and altering the Terms and Powers of Two Acts of Parliament made in the Twentieth (Note: Catterick Bridge to Durham Road Act 1746 (20 Geo. 2. c. 28)) and Twenty-sixth (Note: Catterick Bridge to Durham Road Act 1753 (26 Geo. 2. c. 95)) Years of the Reign of His late Majesty King George the Second, for repairing the Road leading from Catterick Bridge in the County of York, to Yarm in the said County, and from thence to Stockton in the County of Durham, and from thence through Sedgefield in the said County of Durham to the City of Durham, and for reducing the said Acts into one, and for the more effectually repairing and keeping in Repair the said Road. (Repealed by Catterick Bridge to Durham Road Act 1810 (50 Geo. 3. c. vii))
Wimbourne Minster and Blandford Forum Road Act 1788 (repealed)	28 Geo. 3. c. 91	20 March 1788
An Act for continuing the Term, and enlarging the Powers of an Act passed in the Sixth Year of the Reign of His present Majesty, (Note: Wimbourne Minster and Blandford Forum Road Act 1766 (6 Geo. 3. c. 68)) for repairing and widening the Road from the Cross or Market Place in the Town of Wimborne Minster, to the Cross or Market Place in the Town of Blandford Forum in the County of Dorset. (Repealed by Wimborne Minster and Blandford Forum Road Act 1831 (1 Will. 4. c. ix))
Glasgow Roads Act 1788 (repealed)	28 Geo. 3. c. 92	8 May 1788
An Act for continuing the Term and altering and enlarging the Powers of Three Acts passed in the Twenty-sixth (Note: Glasgow Roads Act 1753 (26 Geo. 2. c. 90)) and Twenty-seventh (Note: Glasgow Roads Act 1754 (27 Geo. 2. c. 27)) Years of the Reign of His late Majesty, and in the Twelfth Year of the Reign of His present Majesty, (Note: Glasgow and Dumbarton Roads Act 1772 (12 Geo. 3. c. 106)) for repairing several Roads leading into the City of Glasgow, so far as relates to that Part of the Road from the City of Glasgow to the Town of Dumbarton, which leads through the County to the Town of Dumbarton. (Repealed by Yoker Bridge and Dumbarton Road Act 1813 (53 Geo. 3. c. lxiii))
Maidstone to Key Street Road Act 1788 (repealed)	28 Geo. 3. c. 93	8 May 1788
An Act to continue the Term and Powers of an Act passed in the Ninth Year of the Reign of His present Majesty King George the Third, (Note: Maidstone to Key Street Road Act 1769 (9 Geo. 3. c. 78)) for repairing and widening the Road from Maidstone, through Debtling, to Key Street in the Parishes of Borden and Bobbing in the County of Kent. (Repealed by Road from Maidstone to Key Street Act 1829 (10 Geo. 4. c. xxiv))
Salop Roads Act 1788 (repealed)	28 Geo. 3. c. 94	8 May 1788
An Act for continuing the Term and varying some of the Provisions of an Act of the Seventh Year of His present Majesty, (Note: Denbigh, Flint, Salop and Chester Roads Act 1766 (7 Geo. 3. c. 104)) for repairing and widening the Road from Marchwiel in the County of Denbigh, through Bangor, Worthenbury, and Hanmer, in the County of Flint, to a House in the Possession of Thomas Jenks in Dodington in the Parish of Whitchurch in the County of Salop, and from Bangor aforesaid, to Malpas in the County of Chester, and from Redbrook to Hampton in the said County of Salop. (Repealed by Marchwiel and Whitchurch (Salop.), Bangor and Malpas, and Redbrook and Hampton Roads Act 1830 (1 Will. 4. c. ii))
Kingston-upon-Hull Roads Act 1788 (repealed)	28 Geo. 3. c. 95	8 May 1788
An Act for continuing the Term and Powers of Two Acts passed in the Eighteenth Year of the Reign of His late Majesty King George the Second, (Note: Kingston-upon-Hull Roads Act 1744 (18 Geo. 2. c. 4)) and the Seventh Year of the Reign of His present Majesty, (Note: Kingston-upon-Hull Roads Act 1766 (7 Geo. 3. c. 70)) for repairing the Road leading from the Town of Kingston-upon-Hull, to and through the Town of Anlaby; and from thence to the Town of Kirk Ella in the County of the said Town of Kingston-upon-Hull. (Repealed by Road from Kingston-upon-Hull to Kirk Ella Act 1829 (10 Geo. 4. c. xcii))
Montgomery Salop and Denbigh Roads Act 1788 (repealed)	28 Geo. 3. c. 96	8 May 1788
An Act for more effectually repairing the Roads leading from Pool through Oswestry to Wrexham, from Knockin to Llanrhaiadr, from Whitehurst's House in the Road between Oswestry and Wrexham to Llangollen, and several other Roads therein mentioned in the Counties of Montgomery, Salop, and Denbigh; and for discharging the Trustees for repairing the Bala and Dolgelley Roads, from the Care of the Road between Llangollen and the Confines of the County of Denbigh; and for making Provision for the future Repair of the said Road. (Repealed by Pool, Oswestry and Wrexham Roads Act 1820 (1 Geo. 4. c. xlv))
Scole Bridge to Bury St. Edmunds Road Act 1788 (repealed)	28 Geo. 3. c. 97	8 May 1788
An Act for continuing the Term of an Act of the Ninth Year of His present Majesty, (Note: Scole Bridge to Bury St. Edmunds Road Act 1769 (9 Geo. 3. c. 67)) for repairing and widening the Road from Scole Bridge to the Town of Bury Saint Edmunds in the County of Suffolk, and for amending the said Act. (Repealed by Scole Bridge and Bury St. Edmunds Road Act 1828 (9 Geo. 4. c. lxxv))
Stafford Roads Act 1788 (repealed)	28 Geo. 3. c. 98	8 May 1788
An Act for amending, widening, turning, and keeping in Repair the Road leading from the Town of Walsall to Hamstead Bridge, and the Road leading from the said Town to a Common, called Sutton Coldfield, and the Road leading from the said Town to a certain Brook, called Park Brook, which divides the Parishes of Walsall and Wolverhampton, all in the County of Stafford. (Repealed by Walsall Roads Act 1831 (1 Will. 4. c. xlvi))
Nottinghamshire and Derby Roads (No. 2) Act 1788 (repealed)	28 Geo. 3. c. 99	8 May 1788
An Act for repairing and widening the Road from the Nottingham and Mansfield Turnpike in the Liberty of Blidworth, to the Mile Oak in the Parish of Kirkby in Ashfield in the County of Nottingham, and from thence through Pinxton to Carter Lane in the Parish of South Normanton, and from Pinxton to the Colliery near Pinxton Green in the County of Derby. (Repealed by Blidworth and Pinxton Green Road (Nottinghamshire) Act 1808 (48 Geo. 3. c. lvii) and Blidworth and Pinxton Green Road (Nottinghamshire) Act 1830 (11 Geo. 4 & 1 Will. 4. c. vii))
Leicester Roads Act 1788 (repealed)	28 Geo. 3. c. 100	8 May 1788
An Act for repairing and widening the Road from the Leicester and Welford Turnpike Road in the Counties of Leicester and Northampton, near Foston Lane, to the Turnpike Road leading from Hinckley to Ashby-de-la-Zouch in the said County of Leicester. (Repealed by Roads in Parishes of Desford and Newbold (Leicestershire) Act 1831 (1 Will. 4. c. xxxviii))
Flint Roads Act 1788 (repealed)	28 Geo. 3. c. 101	8 May 1788
An Act for repairing, widening, turning, and altering the Road from the Township of Saltney in the County of Flint, to the Town of Flint in the said County. (Repealed by Road from Saltney to Flint Act 1809 (49 Geo. 3. c. xi) and Road from Flint to Lower King's Ferry Act 1826 (7 Geo. 4. c. lxxxvi) (Note: Incorrectly cited as "7 G 4 c lxxvi" in the Chronological Table of the Statutes.))
Merlin's Bridge and Pembroke Ferry Road Act 1788 (repealed)	28 Geo. 3. c. 102	8 May 1788
An Act for amending, widening, and keeping in Repair the Road leading from Merlin's Bridge to Pembroke Ferry in the County of Pembroke. (Repealed by Merlin's Bridge and Pembroke Ferry Road Act 1808 (48 Geo. 3. c. cxiv) (Note: Incorrectly cited as "1808 c ccxiv" in the Chronological Table of the Statutes.) and Merlin's Bridge and Pembroke Ferry Road Act 1830 (11 Geo. 4 & 1 Will. 4. c. xxxv))
Huddersfield Roads Act 1788 (repealed)	28 Geo. 3. c. 103	8 May 1788
An Act for continuing and amending an Act of the Eighth Year of His present Majesty, (Note: Yorks and Derby Roads Act 1768 (8 Geo. 3. c. 47)) so far as the same relates to the Road from the Township of Huddersfield in the West Riding of the County of York, to Woodhead in the County Palatine of Chester; and from thence to a Bridge over the River Mersey, called Enterclough Bridge, on the Confines of the County of Derby. (Repealed by Huddersfield, Woodhead and Derby Road Act 1831 (1 & 2 Will. 4. c. xl))
Chester and Stafford Roads Act 1788 (repealed)	28 Geo. 3. c. 104	8 May 1788
An Act for amending, widening, and keeping in Repair the Road from Spann Smithy in the County of Chester, to Talk in the County of Stafford. (Repealed by Span Smithy and Talke Road Act 1824 (5 Geo. 4. c. xxv))
Radnor Roads Act 1788 (repealed)	28 Geo. 3. c. 105	8 May 1788
An Act for amending, widening, and keeping in Repair the Roads leading from Staplebar to Lingen, and from thence by Boresford to Willey's Oak, and from Kingsham to the Kington and Radnor Turnpike Roads near the Rod, and from Lingen aforesaid, to Walford in the County of Hereford. (Repealed by South Wales Turnpike Trusts Act 1844 (7 & 8 Vict. c. 91))
Yorkshire Roads Act 1788 (repealed)	28 Geo. 3. c. 106	11 June 1788
An Act for enlarging the Term and Powers of certain Acts of Parliament, so far as the same relate to the Road from Doncaster through Ferrybridge, to the Southside of Tadcaster Cross in the County of York. (Repealed by Road from Doncaster to Tadcaster Cross Act 1831 (1 & 2 Will. 4. c. xv))
Warwick Roads Act 1788 (repealed)	28 Geo. 3. c. 107	11 June 1788
An Act to enlarge the Terms and Powers of Two Acts passed in the Eighteenth Year of the Reign of His late Majesty King George the Second, (Note: Warwickshire Roads Act 1744 (18 Geo. 2. c. 19)) and the Tenth Year of His present Majesty's Reign, (Note: Warwick Roads (No. 2) Act 1770 (10 Geo. 3. c. 69)) for repairing the Road from Birmingham in the County of Warwick, through Elmdon, to a Lane leading by the End of Stone Bridge in the said County. (Repealed by Birmingham and Stonebridge Road Act 1832 (2 & 3 Will. 4. c. xxxiii))
Yorkshire Roads (No. 2) Act 1788 (repealed)	28 Geo. 3. c. 108	11 June 1788
An Act for enlarging the Term and Powers of certain Acts of Parliament, so far as the same relate to the Roads from the Red House near Doncaster, to the South End of Wakefield Bridge, and from Wakefield to Pontefract, and from thence to Weeland in the Township of Hensall, and from Pontefract to Wentbridge in the West Riding of the County of York. (Repealed by Doncaster, Wakefield, Pontefract, Weeland and Wentbridge Roads Act 1831 (1 Will. 4. c. xliv))
Carmarthen Roads Act 1788 (repealed)	28 Geo. 3. c. 109	11 June 1788
An Act for amending, widening, and keeping in Repair the Road from Carmarthen to Lampeterpontstephen in the County of Cardigan, and from Llandovery in the County of Carmarthen to Lampeterpontstephen aforesaid. (Repealed by Roads from Carmarthen Act 1830 (11 Geo. 4 & 1 Will. 4. c. xxix) and Llandovery District of the Lampeter Roads Act 1831 (1 Will. 4. c. lviii))
Yorkshire Roads (No. 3) Act 1788 (repealed)	28 Geo. 3. c. 110	11 June 1788
An Act for continuing the Term, and altering the Powers of certain Acts of Parliament, so far as the same relate to repairing the Road from Rotherham, to the Four Lane Ends near Wortley, in the West Riding of the County of York; and for discharging the Trustees from the Care of the Road from the Four Lane Ends aforesaid, to Hartcliffe Hill. (Repealed by Rotherham and Wortley Road Act 1830 (11 Geo. 4 & 1 Will. 4. c. lxxxiv) (Note: Incorrectly cited as "11 G 4 & 1 W 4 c lxxiv" in the Chronological Table of the Statutes.))
Chester Roads Act 1788 (repealed)	28 Geo. 3. c. 111	11 June 1788
An Act for enlarging the Term and Powers of so much of an Act made in the Ninth Year of the Reign of His present Majesty, (Note: Stafford and Chester Roads Act 1769 (9 Geo. 3. c. 94)) intituled, "An Act for repealing so much of Two several Acts of Parliament made and passed in the Seventeenth (Note: Litchfield Roads Act 1743 (17 Geo. 2. c. 24)) and Twenty-eighth (Note: Litchfield and Chester Roads Act 1755 (28 Geo. 2. c. 52)) Years of the Reign of His late Majesty King George the Second, as relate to the Road from the End of the County of Stafford, in the Post Road towards the City of Chester, through Woor in the County of Salop, to Nantwich in the County of Chester; and from Nantwich to Tarporley, and from thence through Tarvin in the said County of Chester, to the said City of Chester; and for more effectually repairing, widening, and supporting the same Road, and also for repairing and widening the Road from Northwich in the said County of Chester, to the Cross in Tarvin aforesaid," as relates to the Second and Third Districts of Road comprised in the said Act of the Ninth Year of the Reign of His present Majesty, and for including the Road from Vicker's Cross to the Turnpike Road leading from Flookers-brook Bridge, to Frodsham in the said Third District. (Repealed by Road from Northwich to Kelsall Hill (Cheshire) Act 1828 (9 Geo. 4. c. cv) and Chester, Tarvin, Delamere and Duddan Smithy Road Act 1829 (10 Geo. 4. c. xxv))
Denbigh Roads Act 1788 (repealed)	28 Geo. 3. c. 112	11 June 1788
An Act to enlarge the Term and Powers of an Act passed in the Twenty-ninth Year of the Reign of King George the Second, (Note: Shrewsbury and Wrexham Road Act 1756 (29 Geo. 2. c. 93)) for repairing the Road from Shrewsbury to Wrexham in the County of Denbigh, and from Wrexham to Chester, and also from Broughton to Mold in the County of Flint, and several other Roads therein mentioned; and for making and repairing a Road from the said Wrexham and Chester Road, to the Wrexham and Ruthin Road in the said County of Denbigh. (Repealed by Shrewsbury to Wrexham Road Act 1813 (53 Geo. 3. c. cxxxii), Broughton and Mold Roads Act 1822 (3 Geo. 4. c. l), Road from Chester to Wrexham Act 1828 (9 Geo. 4. c. lxxvii) and Shrewsbury, Ellesmere and Wrexham Road Act 1838 (1 & 2 Vict. c. xvii))
Lancaster Roads Act 1788 (repealed)	28 Geo. 3. c. 113	11 June 1788
An Act for enlarging the Term of an Act made in the Second Year of the Reign of His present Majesty, (Note: Lancaster Roads Act 1762 (2 Geo. 3. c. 44)) for repairing and widening the Roads from a certain Place near Bolton-in-the-Moors to Leigh, and from thence to the Guide Post near Golbourne Dale, and to the South End of Newton Bridge, and from the said Guide Post to Winwick, and from Newton by Parr Stocks to the Guide Post in Parr in the County Palatine of Lancaster; and for making more effectual Provision for repairing and widening the said Roads, except from the said Guide Post near Golbourne Dale to Winwick. (Repealed by Bolton-le-Moors and Parr Roads Act 1829 (10 Geo. 4. c. lxxxv))
Dumfries Roads Act 1788 (repealed)	28 Geo. 3. c. 114	11 June 1788
An Act for repairing and widening the Road from Dumfries by Ae Bridge, to Moffat in the County of Dumfries. (Repealed by %[%[Roads in Dumfries and Kirkcudbright Act 1801]] ([[41 Geo. 3 (U.K.)41 Geo. 3%]%]. c. xlix))
Worcester and Warwick Roads (No. 2) Act 1788	28 Geo. 3. c. 115	11 June 1788
An Act to continue the Term and Powers of an Act made in the Seventh Year of the Reign of His present Majesty, (Note: Worcester and Warwick Roads Act 1766 (7 Geo. 3. c. 68)) for amending and widening the Road leading from the Bell Inn at Northfield in the County of Worcester, to the Wootton Turnpike in the Great Turnpike Road leading from Stratford-upon-Avon in the County of Warwick, to Birmingham in the same County.

=== Private acts ===
Short title	Citation	Royal assent
Long title
Riddlesden with Morton Inclosure Act 1788	28 Geo. 3. c. 1 Pr.	10 March 1788
An Act for dividing, allotting, and enclosing the Commons or Waste Grounds within the Manor of Riddlesden otherwise Morton or Riddlesden with Morton in the Parish of Bingley in the West Riding of the County of York.
Meare and Wedmore Inclosure Act 1788	28 Geo. 3. c. 2 Pr.	10 March 1788
An Act for dividing, allotting, and enclosing certain Moors, Commons, or Waste Lands, within the Parishes of Mear and Wedmore in the County of Somerset.
Westbury Inclosure Act 1788	28 Geo. 3. c. 3 Pr.	10 March 1788
An Act for dividing, allotting, and enclosing certain Commons or Waste Lands, within the Parish of Westbury in the County of Somerset.
Bleadon Inclosure Act 1788	28 Geo. 3. c. 4 Pr.	10 March 1788
An Act for dividing, allotting, and enclosing certain Commons or Waste Lands, within the Manor of Bleadon in the County of Somerset.
Wylde's Name Act 1788	28 Geo. 3. c. 5 Pr.	10 March 1788
An Act for enabling Ralph Browne Wylde and his Issue, to take the Name and bear the Arms of Browne, pursuant to the Will of Jane Browne, late of Caughley in the Parish of Barrow in the County of Salop, Widow, deceased.
Reade's Estate Act 1788	28 Geo. 3. c. 6 Pr.	20 March 1788
An Act for vesting the Real Estate of Thomas Reade Esquire, and Elizabeth Reade his Daughter, situate in Shirburn, Brittwell, Sallome, Lewknor, Stokenchurch, and Kingston Blount, in the County of Oxford, in Thomas Earl of Macclesfield and his Heirs, and for settling another Real Estate of the said Earl of greater Value in lieu thereof, and in Exchange for the same, in Manner therein mentioned.
Parwich Inclosure Act 1788	28 Geo. 3. c. 7 Pr.	20 March 1788
An Act for dividing and enclosing certain Open Fields or Stinted Pastures, lying within the Parish of Parwich in the County of Derby.
Chartley Inclosure Act 1788	28 Geo. 3. c. 8 Pr.	20 March 1788
An Act for dividing and enclosing the several Common and Open Fields, Meadows, Pastures, Commons, and Waste Grounds, within the Liberty of Hixton, and the Commons and Waste Grounds within the Liberties of Drointon, Lea, and Amerton, all within the Manor of Chartley in the County of Stafford.
Humberstone Inclosure Act 1788	28 Geo. 3. c. 9 Pr.	20 March 1788
An Act for dividing, allotting, and enclosing the Open Fields, Meadows, and Commonable Grounds in the Parish or Lordship of Humberstone in the County of Leicester.
Headbourn Worthy Inclosure Act 1788	28 Geo. 3. c. 10 Pr.	20 March 1788
An Act for dividing, allotting, and enclosing the Open and Common Fields, Arable Lands, Pastures, Woods, Downs, Cow Downs, Sheep Downs, Waste Lands, and other Open and Commonable Places within the Parish of Headbourn Worthy in the County of Southampton.
Bradwell Inclosure Act 1788	28 Geo. 3. c. 11 Pr.	20 March 1788
An Act for dividing and enclosing the Open and Common Fields, Common Pastures, Common Meadows, and other Commonable Lands and Grounds, of and within the Parish of Bradwell in the County Bucks.
Wavendon Inclosure Act 1788	28 Geo. 3. c. 12 Pr.	20 March 1788
An Act for dividing and enclosing the several Open Arable Fields, Meadows, Heaths, Commons, and Waste Grounds within the Manor and Parish of Wandon, otherwise Wavendon, in the County of Bucks.
Filey Inclosure Act 1788	28 Geo. 3. c. 13 Pr.	20 March 1788
An Act for dividing, allotting, and enclosing the several Open and Common Arable Fields, Meadows, Pastures, Commons, and Waste Grounds within the Township of Filey, otherwise Filo, in the East and North Ridings of the County of York.
Mowsley Inclosure Act 1788	28 Geo. 3. c. 14 Pr.	20 March 1788
An Act for dividing and enclosing the Open and Common Fields, Meadows, and Commons, of and within the Lordship or Liberty of Mowsley in the County of Leicester.
Knapton Inclosure Act 1788	28 Geo. 3. c. 15 Pr.	20 March 1788
An Act for dividing and enclosing the Common Arable Fields and other Common Grounds within the Manor or Lordship and Township of Knapton in the County of the City of York.
Fladbury Inclosure Act 1788	28 Geo. 3. c. 16 Pr.	20 March 1788
An Act for dividing and enclosing the Open and Common Fields, Common Meadows, and other Common and Waste Lands in Fladbury in the County of Worcester.
Hintze's Naturalization Act 1788	28 Geo. 3. c. 17 Pr.	20 March 1788
An Act for naturalizing Daniel Godfrey Hintze.
Duke of Newcastle's Estate Act 1788	28 Geo. 3. c. 18 Pr.	8 May 1788
An Act for divesting Sir Henry Clinton and his Heirs, of the Trusts of divers Castles, Honours, Manors, Messuages, Lands, Tenements, and Hereditaments of the Most Noble Henry Duke of Newcastle, and for vesting the same in another Trustee, upon the same Trusts, and with the like Powers as are mentioned and declared in an Indenture of Release of the Twentieth Day of May One thousand seven hundred and seventy-five, or such of them as remain to be performed, or are capable of taking Effect.
Viscount Falmouth's Estate Act 1788	28 Geo. 3. c. 19 Pr.	8 May 1788
An Act for vesting Part of the Real Estate of the late Hugh Lord Viscount Falmouth, situate in the Borough of Tregony and Parish of Cuby in the County of Cornwall in Trustees to be sold and conveyed to Sir Francis Basset Baronet; and for other Purposes therein mentioned.
Biscoe's Estate Act 1788	28 Geo. 3. c. 20 Pr.	8 May 1788
An Act to enable Elisha Biscoe Esquire to grant Building Leases of Part of the Estates devised by the Will of his late Father Elisha Biscoe Esquire, deceased.
Adderley's Estate Act 1788	28 Geo. 3. c. 21 Pr.	8 May 1788
An Act to enable Charles Bowyer Adderley Esquire, and the future Tenants for Life of the Estates devised by the Will of Bowyer Adderley Esquire, to grant Building and Repairing Leases thereof.
Reverend Philip Puleston's and Sir Watkin Winn's estates: exchange of lands and hereditaments in Ruabon (Denbighshire).	28 Geo. 3. c. 22 Pr.	8 May 1788
An Act for confirming and establishing an Exchange agreed upon between the Reverend Philip Puleston, Doctor in Divinity, Vicar of the Parish of Ruabon in the County of Denbigh, and Sir Watkin Williams Wynne Baronet, of certain Lands and other Hereditaments within the said Parish.
Chafin's Estate Act 1788	28 Geo. 3. c. 23 Pr.	8 May 1788
An Act for Sale of Part of the Settled Estates of William Chafin Clerk, in the Counties of Dorset and Wilts, for paying certain Portions charged thereon; and for other Purposes.
Hesslewood Charity Estates and Pease's estate: exchange of lands and hereditaments.	28 Geo. 3. c. 24 Pr.	8 May 1788
An Act to exchange Lands and Hereditaments between the Trustees of a Charity Estate in Hesslewood in the Parish of Hessle in the County of the Town of Kingston upon Hull, and Joseph Robinson Pease Esquire.
Amyand's Estate Act 1788	28 Geo. 3. c. 25 Pr.	8 May 1788
An Act for vesting certain Freehold Estates devised by the Will of Sir George Amyand Baronet, deceased in Trustees to sell the same, and for laying out the Money arising by such Sale in the Purchase of other Manors, Lands, or Hereditaments, to be settled in lieu thereof to the like Uses.
Gossip's Estate Act 1788	28 Geo. 3. c. 26 Pr.	8 May 1788
An Act for allowing Timber to be cut upon certain Estates settled by the Will and a Codicil of William Gossip Esquire, and for applying the Money to arise therefrom in making Repairs on the same Estates; and laying out the Remainder in Purchases of other Estates, to be settled to the same Uses.
Templer's Estate Act 1788	28 Geo. 3. c. 27 Pr.	8 May 1788
An Act for vesting Part of the Settled Estates of James Templer Esquire, in the County of Devon, in him and his Heirs, in Exchange for another Estate of greater Value in the same County, to be settled in Lieu thereof.
Errington's Divorce Act 1788	28 Geo. 3. c. 28 Pr.	8 May 1788
An Act to dissolve the Marriage of George Errington Esquire, with Harriet Coren his now Wife, and to enable him to marry again; and for other Purposes therein mentioned.
Swaby and Belleau Inclosure Act 1788	28 Geo. 3. c. 29 Pr.	8 May 1788
An Act for dividing and enclosing certain Open Common Fields, Meadows, Pastures, and other Com Commonable Lands, and Waste Grounds within the Townships or Parishes of Swaby and Belleau in the County of Lincoln.
Castlemartin Corse Drainage and Inclosure Act 1788	28 Geo. 3. c. 30 Pr.	8 May 1788
An Act for draining, dividing, and enclosing the Common and Waste Ground called Castlemartin Corse within the Manor and Parish of Castlemartin in the County of Pembroke.
Wollaston Inclosure Act 1788	28 Geo. 3. c. 31 Pr.	8 May 1788
An Act for dividing and enclosing the Open and Common Fields, Pastures, Meadows, and other Commonable Lands and Grounds in the Parish of Wollaston in the County of Northampton.
Manor of Mangotsfield (Gloucestershire): vesting commons and waste-grounds in Charles Bragge, extinguishing rights of common over them and securing a rentcharge for the poor of the parish.	28 Geo. 3. c. 32 Pr.	8 May 1788
An Act for extinguishing all Right of Common on the several Commons and Waste Grounds in the Manor and Parish of Mangotsfield in the County of Gloucester, (except Mangotsfield Common, Emmerson's Green, and Vinney Green,) and for vesting the said Commons and Waste Grounds in Charles Bragge Esquire, Lord of the said Manor, discharged from the said Right of Common; and for securing a Rent Charge issuing out of the same for the Benefit of the Poor of the said Parish.
Kirkbymoorside Inclosure Act 1788	28 Geo. 3. c. 33 Pr.	8 May 1788
An Act for dividing and enclosing the Common Arable Fields, and also certain Commons and Waste Lands within the Townships of Kirkbymoorside, Fadmoor, and Gillamoor, in the Parish of Kirkbymoorside in the North Riding of the County of York.
Little Farringdon Inclosure Act 1788	28 Geo. 3. c. 34 Pr.	8 May 1788
An Act for dividing, allotting, and enclosing the Open and Common Fields, Common Meadows, Common Pastures, and Waste Lands, in the Hamlet of Little Farringdon in the Parish of Longford in the County of Berks.
Stretton-in-the-Dale Inclosure Act 1788	28 Geo. 3. c. 35 Pr.	8 May 1788
An Act for dividing and enclosing certain Commons and Waste Lands within the Manor of Stretton in the Dale in the County of Salop.
Netheravon Inclosure Act 1788	28 Geo. 3. c. 36 Pr.	8 May 1788
An Act for dividing, allotting, and laying in Severalty the Open and Common Fields, Open Downs, Common Meadows, Common Pastures, and Waste Lands within the Parish of Netherhaven, otherwise Netheravon, in the County of Wilts.
North and South Rauceby Inclosure Act 1788	28 Geo. 3. c. 37 Pr.	8 May 1788
An Act for dividing and enclosing the Open and Common Fields, Heath, Waste, and Commonable Lands within the Manors and Townships of North and South Rauceby in the County of Lincoln.
Compton Martin Inclosure Act 1788	28 Geo. 3. c. 38 Pr.	8 May 1788
An Act for dividing and enclosing the Common and Waste Lands within the Parish of Compton Martin in the County of Somerset.
Spondon Inclosure Act 1788	28 Geo. 3. c. 39 Pr.	8 May 1788
An Act for dividing and enclosing the Open Fields, Common Pastures, Common or Moor, and Waste Grounds within the Hamlet or Liberty of Spondon in the County of Derby.
Bagby Inclosure Act 1788	28 Geo. 3. c. 40 Pr.	8 May 1788
An Act for dividing and enclosing certain Moors or Commons within the Township of Bagby in the North Riding of the County of York.
Earl Camden's Estate (Kentish Town Prebendal Lands) Act 1788	28 Geo. 3. c. 41 Pr.	11 June 1788
An Act for enabling Charles Earl Camden to grant in the Manner therein mentioned, Building Leases of the Prebendal Lands at Kentish Town in the County of Middlesex.
Glynne's Estate Act 1788	28 Geo. 3. c. 42 Pr.	11 June 1788
An Act to enable the Guardian of Sir Stephen Richard Glynne Baronet an Infant, and also Francis Glynne Esquire, and likewise the Guardians of the several Persons who may hereafter become entitled to the Estates in the County of Flint, comprised in the Settlement made on the Marriage of John Conway Glynne Esquire, deceased, and the Will of Sir John Glynne Baronet, also deceased, to grant Leases of the Coal and other Mines within the said Estates.
Yafforth, Thruntoft, Little Langton and Danby-upon-Wisk (Yorkshire, North Riding) Inclosure Act 1788	28 Geo. 3. c. 43 Pr.	11 June 1788
An Act for dividing and enclosing a certain Moor or Common within the several Townships of Yafforth, Thruntoft, Little Langton, and Danby-uponWisk, some or one of them, in the North Riding of the County of York.
Brightside in Sheffield Inclosure Act 1788	28 Geo. 3. c. 44 Pr.	11 June 1788
An Act for dividing and enclosing the Commons and Waste Grounds within the Township of Brightside in the Manor and Parish of Sheffield in the West Riding of the County of York.
Featherstone Inclosure Act 1788	28 Geo. 3. c. 45 Pr.	11 June 1788
An Act for dividing and enclosing the Open Fields, and also a certain Common or Parcel of Waste Ground within the Township of Featherstone in the West Riding of the County of York.
Grassington Inclosure Act 1788	28 Geo. 3. c. 46 Pr.	11 June 1788
An Act for dividing and enclosing the several Stinted Pastures, called Old Pasture, New Pasture, Botton, and Losgill Bank in the Township of Grassington in the County of York.
Tynemouth Inclosure Act 1788	28 Geo. 3. c. 47 Pr.	11 June 1788
An Act for dividing, allotting, and enclosing a certain Common Moor or Tract of Waste Land, called Tynemouth Moor, Shire Moor, Billy Moor, or Billy Mill Moor within the Manor of Tynemouth, otherwise Tynemouthshire, otherwise Tynmouth with Tynmouthshire, in the County of Northumberland.
Billington and Wilpshire (Lancashire) Inclosure Act 1788	28 Geo. 3. c. 48 Pr.	11 June 1788
An Act for dividing and enclosing the several Commons or Waste Grounds within the several Manors or Lordships of Billington and Wilpshire, otherwise Wilpshire with Dinckley, in the Parish of Blackburn and Honour of Clitheroe in the Hundred of Blackburn and County Palatine of Lancaster.
Streetmarshal, Tyrymynech, and Deytheur (Montgomeryshire) Inclosure Act 1788	28 Geo. 3. c. 49 Pr.	11 June 1788
An Act for dividing and enclosing the Common Fields and Waste Lands within the Manors of Streetmarshal, Tirymynech, and Deytheur in the County of Montgomery.
Weber's Naturalization Act 1788	28 Geo. 3. c. 50 Pr.	11 June 1788
An Act for naturalizing John Philip Weber.
Nantes' Naturalization Act 1788	28 Geo. 3. c. 51 Pr.	11 June 1788
An Act for naturalizing Daniel Nantes.
Guerry's Naturalization Act 1788	28 Geo. 3. c. 52 Pr.	11 June 1788
An Act for naturalizing the Reverend Lewis Guerry.
Acland's Estate Act 1788	28 Geo. 3. c. 53 Pr.	25 June 1788
An Act to enable the Trustees of the Will of Sir Thomas Dyke Acland Baronet, to cut down and sell Timber upon the Estates thereby devised, and to grant Leases of Part of the same Estates, upon Fines, and to invest the Monies arising therefrom, in the Purchase of Lands and Hereditaments, to be settled to the Uses of the Will.
Long Sutton or Sutton-in-Holland (Lincolnshire) Inclosure Act 1788	28 Geo. 3. c. 54 Pr.	25 June 1788
An Act for dividing and enclosing the Common Marsh, Common Fen, and other Waste Grounds, in the Parish of Long Sutton, otherwise Sutton in Holland, in the County of Lincoln.
Twiss's Divorce Act 1788	28 Geo. 3. c. 55 Pr.	25 June 1788
An Act to dissolve the Marriage of Jonathan Twiss Esquire with Frances Dorrill his now Wife, and to enable him to marry again, and for other Purposes therein mentioned.

=== Sources ===
- Pickering, Danby, ed. (1787). "Anno vicesimo octavo Georgi III". The Statutes at Large. Vol. 36. Cambridge: John Archdeacon. pp. 327–565 – via Google Books.
- Journals of the House of Commons. Vol. 43. London: His Majesty's Stationery Office. 1803. pp. 3–653 – via Google Books.
- Journal of the House of Lords. Vol. 38: 1787-1790. London: His Majesty's Stationery Office. 1830. pp. 3–263 – via British History Online.
- Chronological Table of and Index to the Statutes. Vol. 1: To the End of the Session 59 Vict. Sess. 2 (1895) (13th ed.). London: Her Majesty's Stationery Office. 1896. pp. 147–148 – via Google Books.
- Chronological Table of the Statutes: Covering the Period from 1235 to the End of 1971. London: Her Majesty's Stationery Office. 1972. pp. 171–173. ISBN 978-0-11-840096-1 – via Google Books.

== See also ==
- List of acts of the Parliament of Great Britain
