= Luddites =

19th-century English anti-automation group

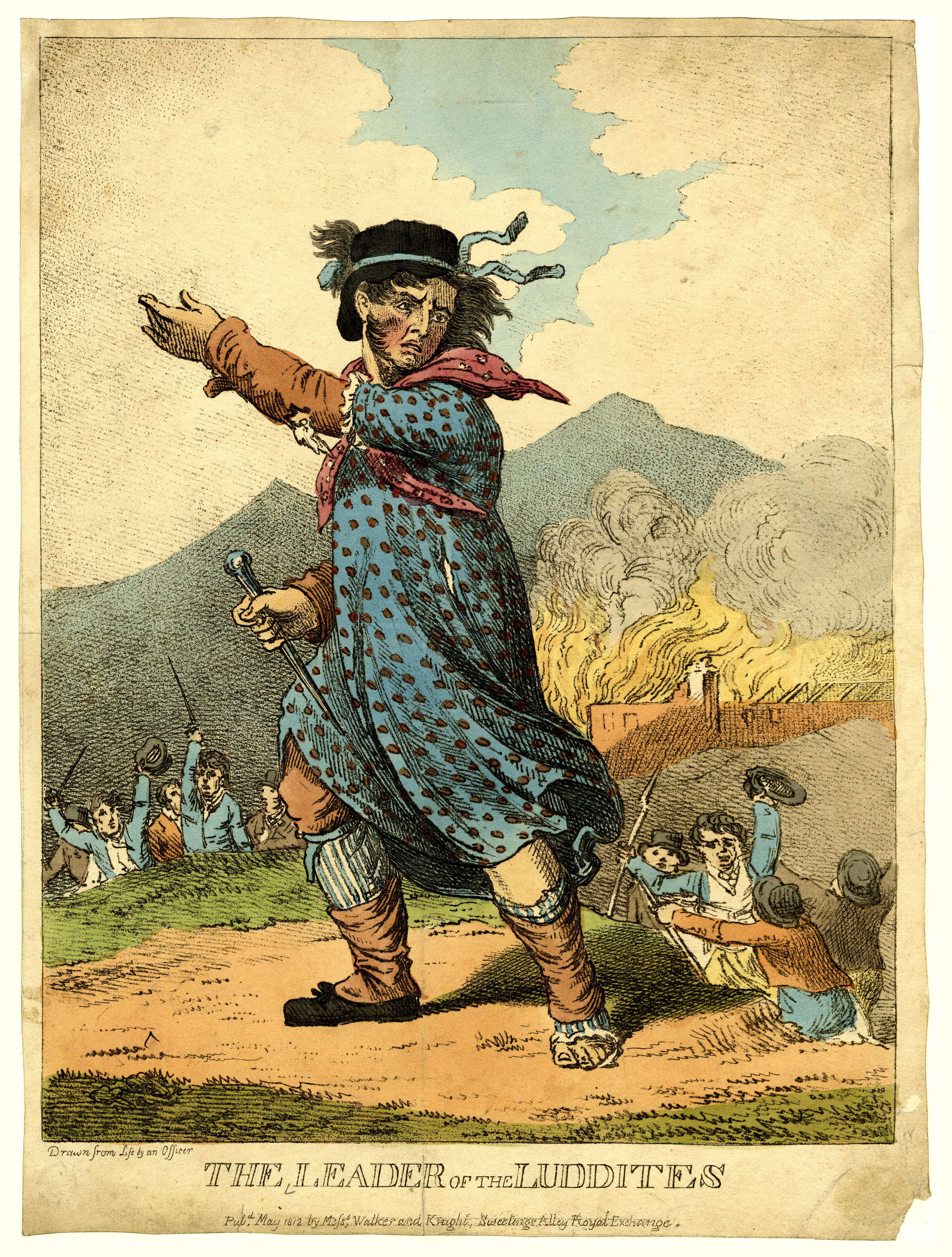
The Leader of the Luddites, 1812. Hand-coloured etching

The Luddites were members of a 19th-century movement of English textile workers who protested against the usage of certain types of automated machinery owing to their concerns over worker pay, labour savings, child labour, working conditions, and output quality. They often destroyed production machines in organised raids. Members of the group referred to themselves as Luddites, self-described followers of "Ned Ludd", a legendary weaver whose name was used as a pseudonym in threatening letters to mill owners and government officials.

The Luddite movement began in Nottingham, England, and spread to the North West and Yorkshire between 1811 and 1816. Mill and factory owners took to shooting protesters, and the Luddites were eventually suppressed by legal and military force, which included execution and penal transportation of convicted members.

More recently the term has been adopted as a reference to those who are opposed to new technologies.

== Etymology ==
The name Luddite (/ˈlʌdaɪt/ LUD-ite) occurs in the movement's writings as early as 1811. They utilised the eponym of Ned Ludd, an apocryphal apprentice who allegedly smashed two stocking frames in 1779 after being criticised and instructed to change his method. The name often appears as Captain, General, or King Ludd. Different versions of the legends place his residence in Anstey, near Leicester, or Sherwood Forest.

== History ==
=== Background ===
In the 18th century, occupations that arose from the growth of trade and shipping in ports, also known as "domestic" manufacturers, were notorious for precarious employment prospects. Underemployment was chronic during this period, and it was common practice to retain a larger workforce than was typically necessary for insurance against labour shortages in boom times.

Moreover, the organisation of manufacture by merchant capitalists in the textile industry was inherently unstable. While the financiers' capital was still largely invested in raw materials, it was easy to increase commitment when trade was good and almost as easy to cut back when times were bad. Merchant capitalists lacked the incentive of later factory owners, whose capital was invested in buildings and plants, to maintain a steady rate of production and return on fixed capital. The combination of seasonal variations in wage rates and violent short-term fluctuations springing from harvests and war produced periodic outbreaks of violence.

=== Historical precedents ===
The machine-breaking of the Luddites followed from previous outbreaks of sabotage in the English textile industry, especially in the hosiery and woollen trades. Organised action by stockingers had occurred at various times since 1675. In Lancashire, new cotton spinning technologies were met with violent resistance in 1768 and 1779. These new inventions produced textiles faster and cheaper because they could be operated by less-skilled, low-wage labourers. These struggles sometimes resulted in government suppression, via acts of Parliament such as the Protection of Stocking Frames, etc. Act 1788.

Periodic uprisings relating to asset prices also occurred in other contexts in the century before Luddism. Irregular rises in food prices provoked the Keelmen to riot in the port of Tyne in 1710 and tin miners to steal from granaries at Falmouth in 1727. (Note: The Falmouth magistrates reported to the Duke of Newcastle (16 November 1727) that "the unruly tinners" had "broke open and plundered several cellars and granaries of corn." Their report concludes with a comment which suggests that they were not able to understand the rationale of the direct action of the tinners: "The occasion of these outrages was pretended by the rioters to be a scarcity of corn in the county, but this suggestion is probably false, as most of those who carried off the corn gave it away or sold it at a quarter price." PRO, SP 36/4/22.) There was a rebellion in Northumberland and Durham in 1740, and an assault on Quaker corn dealers in 1756.

Malcolm I. Thomis argued in his 1970 history The Luddites that machine-breaking was one of the very few tactics that workers could use to increase pressure on employers, undermine lower-paid competing workers, and create solidarity among workers. "These attacks on machines did not imply any necessary hostility to machinery as such; machinery was just a conveniently exposed target against which an attack could be made." Marxist Historian Eric Hobsbawm called their machine wrecking "collective bargaining by riot", which had been a tactic used in Britain since the Restoration because manufactories were scattered throughout the country, and that made it impractical to hold large-scale strikes. An agricultural variant of Luddism occurred during the widespread Swing Riots of 1830 in southern and eastern England, centring on breaking threshing machines.

=== Peak activity: 1811–1817 ===
The Luddite movement emerged during the harsh economic climate of the Napoleonic Wars, which saw a rise in difficult working conditions in the new textile factories paired with decreasing birth rates and a rise in education standards in England and Wales. Luddites were not opposed to the use of machines per se (many were skilled operators in the textile industry); they attacked manufacturers who were trying to circumvent standard labour practices of the time. The movement began in Arnold, Nottinghamshire, on 11 March 1811 and spread rapidly throughout England over the following two years. The British economy suffered greatly in 1810 to 1812, especially in terms of high unemployment and inflation. The causes included the high cost of the wars with Napoleon, Napoleon's Continental System of economic warfare, and escalating conflict with the United States. The crisis led to widespread protest and violence, but the middle classes and upper classes strongly supported the government, which used the army to suppress all working-class unrest, especially the Luddite movement.

The Luddites met at night on the moors surrounding industrial towns to practise military-like drills and manoeuvres. Their main areas of operation began in Nottinghamshire in November 1811, followed by the West Riding of Yorkshire in early 1812, and then Lancashire by March 1813. They wrecked specific types of machinery that posed a threat to the particular industrial interests in each region. In the Midlands, these were the "wide" knitting frames used to make cheap and inferior lace articles. In the North West, weavers sought to eliminate the steam-powered looms threatening wages in the cotton trade. In Yorkshire, workers opposed the use of shearing frames and gig mills to finish woollen cloth.

Many Luddite groups were highly organized and pursued machine-breaking as one of several tools for achieving specific political ends. In addition to the raids, Luddites coordinated public demonstrations and the mailing of letters to local industrialists and government officials. These letters explained their reasons for destroying the machinery and threatened further action if the use of "obnoxious" machines continued. The writings of Midlands Luddites often justified their demands through the legitimacy of the Company of Framework Knitters, a recognised public body that already openly negotiated with masters through named representatives. In North West England, textile workers lacked these long-standing trade institutions and their letters composed an attempt to achieve recognition as a united body of tradespeople. As such, they were more likely to include petitions for governmental reforms, such as increased minimum wages and the cessation of child labour. Northwestern Luddites were also more likely to use radical language linking their movement to that of American and French revolutionaries. In Yorkshire, the letter-writing campaign shifted to more violent threats against local authorities viewed as complicit in the use of offensive machinery to exert greater commercial control over the labour market.

In Yorkshire, croppers (Note: Croppers were highly skilled workers who trimmed the nap from fabric to produce finished cloth.) faced mass unemployment due to the introduction of cropping machines by Enoch Taylor of Marsden. This sparked the Luddite movement among the croppers of Yorkshire, who used a hammer dubbed "Enoch" to break the frames of the cropping machines. They called it Enoch to mock Enoch Taylor, and when they broke the frames they purportedly shouted "Enoch made them, and Enoch shall break them."

Luddites clashed with government troops at Burton's Mill in Middleton and at Westhoughton Mill, both in Lancashire. The Luddites and their supporters anonymously sent death threats to, and possibly attacked, magistrates and food merchants. Activists smashed Heathcote's lace making machine in Loughborough in 1816. He and other industrialists had secret chambers constructed in their buildings that could be used as hiding places during an attack.

In 1817 Jeremiah Brandreth, an unemployed Nottingham stockinger and probable ex-Luddite, led the Pentrich Rising. While this was a general uprising unrelated to machinery, it can be viewed as the last major Luddite act.

=== Government response ===
12,000 government troops, most of them belonging to militia or yeomanry units, were involved in suppression of Luddite activity, which historian Eric Hobsbawm wrote was a larger number than the army that the Duke of Wellington led into Portugal in 1808 during the Peninsular War. (Note: Hobsbawm has popularised this comparison and refers to the original statement in Frank Ongley Darvall (1934) Popular Disturbances and Public Order in Regency England, London, Oxford University Press, p. 260.) Four Luddites, led by a man named George Mellor, ambushed and assassinated mill owner William Horsfall of Ottiwells Mill in Marsden, West Yorkshire, at Crosland Moor in Huddersfield. Horsfall had remarked that he would "Ride up to his saddle in Luddite blood". Mellor fired the fatal shot to Horsfall's groin, and all four men were arrested. One of the men, Benjamin Walker, turned informant, and the other three were hanged. Lord Byron denounced what he considered to be the plight of the working class, the government's inane policies and ruthless repression in the House of Lords on 27 February 1812:

I have been in some of the most oppressed provinces of Turkey; but never, under the most despotic of infidel governments, did I behold such squalid wretchedness as I have seen since my return, in the very heart of a Christian country.

Government officials sought to suppress the Luddite movement with a mass trial at York in January 1813, following the attack on Cartwrights Mill at Rawfolds near Cleckheaton. The government charged over 60 men, including Mellor and his companions, with various crimes in connection with Luddite activities. While some of those charged were actual Luddites, many had no connection to the movement. Although the proceedings were legitimate jury trials, many were abandoned due to lack of evidence and 30 men were acquitted. These trials were intended to act as show trials to deter other Luddites from continuing their activities. The harsh sentences of those found guilty, which included execution and penal transportation, quickly ended the movement. Parliament made "machine breaking" (i.e. industrial sabotage) a capital crime with the Destruction of Stocking Frames, etc. Act 1812. Lord Byron opposed this legislation, becoming one of the few prominent defenders of the Luddites after the treatment of the defendants at the York trials.

== Legacy ==
The Luddites are memorialised in the Yorkshire-area folk song "The Cropper Lads", which has been recorded by artists including Lou Killen and Maddy Prior. Another traditional song which celebrates the Luddites is the song "The Triumph of General Ludd", which was recorded by Chumbawamba for their 1988 album English Rebel Songs.

== Modern usage ==
Nowadays, the term "Luddite" is sometimes used to describe someone who either opposes or is resistant to the use of new technologies.

In 1956, during a British Parliamentary debate, a Labour spokesman said that "organised workers were by no means wedded to a 'Luddite Philosophy'." By 2006, the term neo-Luddism had emerged to describe opposition to many forms of technology. According to a manifesto drawn up by the Second Luddite Congress (April 1996; Barnesville, Ohio), neo-Luddism is "a leaderless movement of passive resistance to consumerism and the increasingly bizarre and frightening technologies of the Computer Age".

The term "Luddite fallacy" is used by economists to refer to the fear that technological unemployment inevitably generates structural unemployment and is consequently macroeconomically injurious. If a technological innovation reduces necessary labour inputs in a given sector, then the industry-wide cost of production falls, which lowers the competitive price and increases the equilibrium supply point that, theoretically, will require an increase in aggregate labour inputs. During the 20th century and the first decade of the 21st century, the dominant view among economists has been that belief in long-term technological unemployment was indeed a fallacy. More recently, there has been increased support for the view that the benefits of automation are not equally distributed.

== See also ==
- Neo-Luddism
- Postdevelopment theory
- Ruddington Framework Knitters' Museum – features a Luddite gallery
- Simple living
- Swing Riots
- Ted Kaczynski
- Turner Controversy – return to pre-industrial methods of production

== Sources ==
- Ford, Martin R. (2009), The Lights in the Tunnel: Automation, Accelerating Technology and the Economy of the Future, Acculant Publishing, ISBN 978-1448659814.
- Hobsbawm, E. J. (1952). "The Machine Breakers". Past & Present (1): 57–70. doi:10.1093/past/1.1.57. Archived from the original on 13 April 2021.
- Jones, Steven E. (2006). Against technology: from the Luddites to Neo-Luddism. CRC Press. ISBN 978-0-415-97868-2.
- Sale, Kirkpatrick (1995). Rebels against the future: the Luddites and their war on the Industrial Revolution: lessons for the computer age. Basic Books. ISBN 0-201-40718-3.
