= Little Dean's Yard =

Yard in City of Westminster, London, England

Coordinates: 51.4984°N 0.1279°W

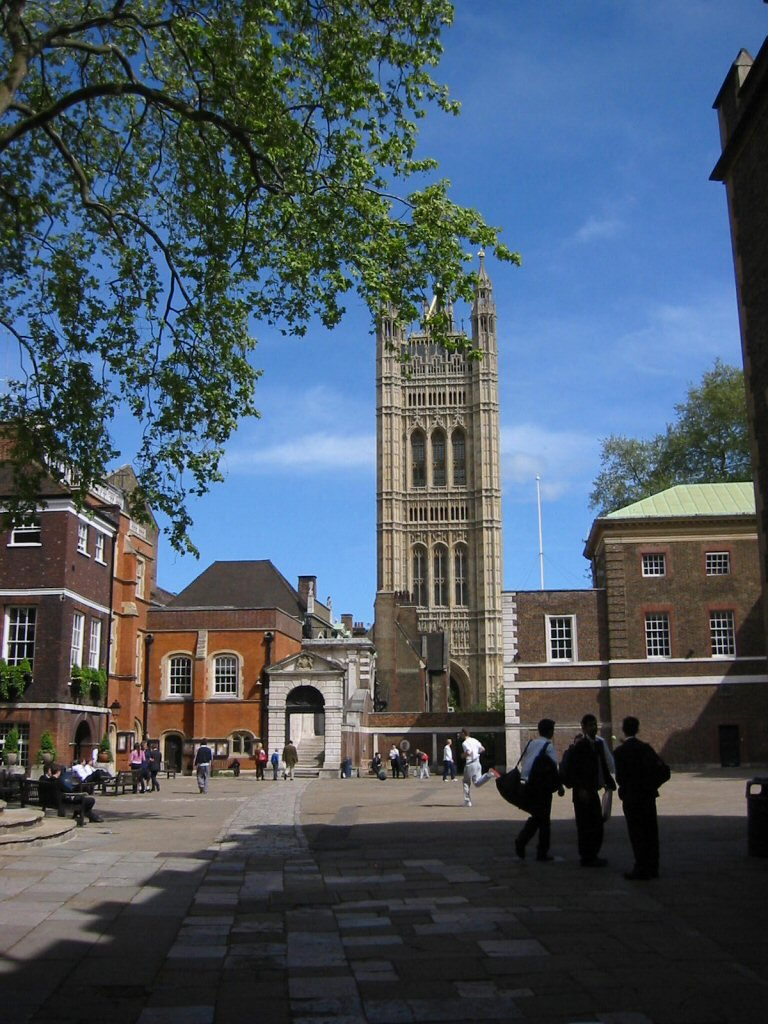
Little Dean's Yard from Liddell's Arch

Little Dean's Yard, known to Westminster School just as Yard, is a private gated yard at the heart of the school, within the precincts of the monastery of Westminster and on the original Thorney Island, now shared between Westminster Abbey and the Palace of Westminster.

To the east is College Garden (which refers to the collegiate body of Westminster Abbey, and not only to the school), the oldest cultivated garden in England, and formerly the infirmary garden of the monastery.

The entrance to the school, formerly the monks' reredorter, is a stone arch designed by Lord Burlington. A stone path marks the original way, before the rest of the yard was paved, to the low stone tunnel under another row of monastic buildings which leads to Dean's Yard.

On the north side of the yard is Ashburnham House, built by Inigo Jones or his pupil John Webb, on the site of the mediaeval Prior's House, parts of which can still be seen. The bricks show marks made by schoolchildren with coins while waiting to enter the school tuck shop.

A wide archway leads through the Dark Cloister to the Abbey, and the school gym. On the south, three Georgian houses accommodate Rigaud's and Grant's houses, and that of the Master of the Queen's Scholars. The College to the east was designed by Burlington, with Christopher Wren's approval after his own design was rejected.

== See also ==
- College (Westminster School)
- College Garden
- Westminster School
