= Westminster Under School =

Independent school in London, England

Location
- 27 Vincent Square; London, Greater London, SW1P 2NN; United Kingdom; 51°29′31″N 0°08′03″W,

Information
- Type: Private preparatory school
- Motto: Dat Deus Incrementum (Classical Latin: "God Gives Increase")
- Religious affiliation: Church of England
- Established: 1943
- Founder: Westminster School
- Local authority: Westminster
- Department for Education URN: 101165 Tables
- The Master: Michael Woodside
- Staff: 47
- Gender: Boys
- Age: 7 to 13
- Enrolment: 285
- Houses: 4
- Colour: Pink
- Publication: The Vincent

Westminster Under School is a private preparatory school for boys and girls aged 4 to 13, attached to Westminster School in London.

The school was founded in 1943 in the precincts of Westminster School in Little Dean's Yard, just behind Westminster Abbey. In 1951 the Under School relocated to its own premises in Eccleston Square. Due to rising numbers of pupils in the 1960s and 1970s, the school moved again in 1981 to its present site, a former hospital, overlooking the Westminster School playing fields in Vincent Square. There are 285 pupils attending the school. The school has a strong musical tradition and prior to COVID-19, provided choristers for St Margaret's Church in Westminster Abbey. It also excels in sport, drama (having produced winners of the recent Shakespeare Schools Festival), chess and Latin.

The previous Master until May 2026 was Kate Jefferson. The current Master is Michael Woodside. There are 47 members of staff.

== History ==
The Under School was founded in September 1943 at 2 Little Dean's Yard (now known as Grant's House) by the former Headmaster of Westminster School, John Traill Christie.

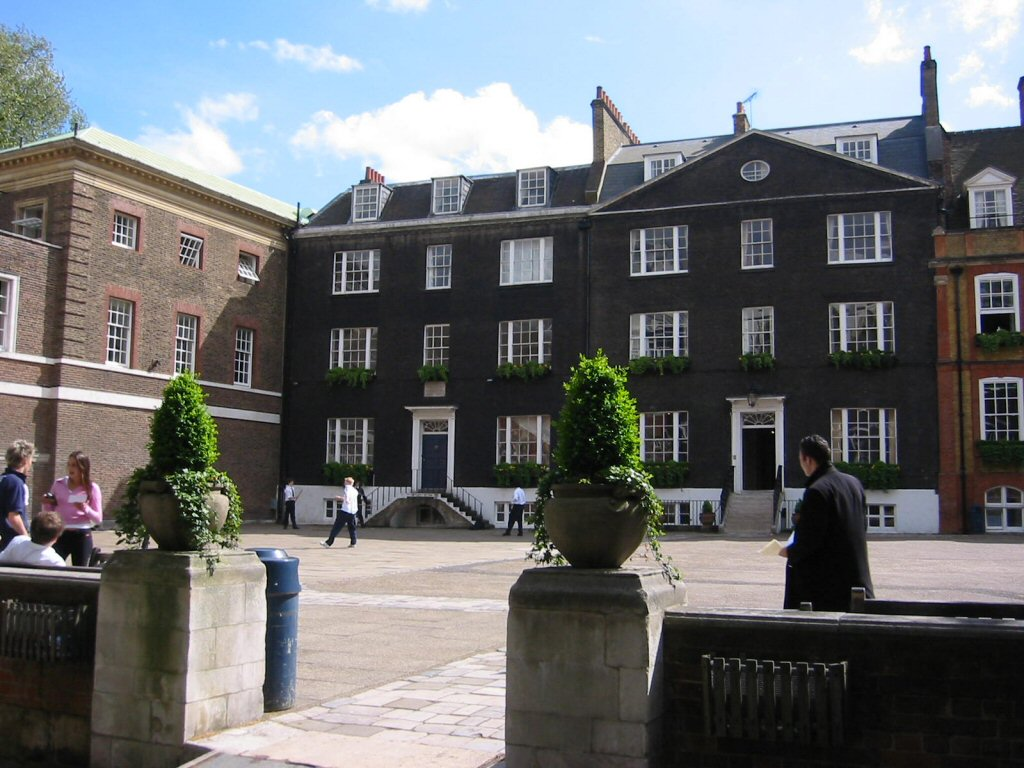
The Under School was first established at 2 Little Dean's Yard, known as Grant's House (right), part of the school including College (far left) was destroyed during the Blitz – this image is a present-day view.

There were six teachers when the school was established and 31 boys. Dean's Yard was used as a playing field for the boys and the roofless remains of the school along with the bombed school hall were used as a playground. St Faith's Chapel in Westminster Abbey served as the school chapel. For much of the Under School's history, the final year (Year 8) was known as the Upper Remove and the second to last year (Year 7) was known as the Remove.

After the war, the school moved to its own premises in Eccleston Square, and in 1981 moved to its present site in Vincent Square to cope with expanding numbers. The building had previously operated as the Grosvenor Hospital between 1866 and 1976.

== Entrance ==
Competitive entrance examinations for Westminster Under School can be taken at 7+, 8+ or 11+. Entry to Westminster Under School at 11+ attracts many pupils from the state sector. At this stage, the school also offers Music Scholarships and means-tested bursaries.

== Campus ==
The school is housed in three buildings, listed below. As well as these buildings and the playing fields of Vincent Square, the school hires facilities at the Queen Mother Sports Centre in Victoria and at Battersea Park.

=== Chapter House ===
The school moved into new premises adjacent to Adrian House, in Chapter Street, in February 2026 while Adrian House undergoes refurbishment.

=== Adrian House ===
The side gate of Adrian House.

Adrian House is situated at 27 Vincent Square, a four-storey building in the south-east corner of Vincent Square in central London. It opened in 1951 and underwent a rebuilding programme in 2001, when new classrooms, a new hall, an Art Department (which became more classrooms following the opening of George House) and an IT suite were built on the site of the old hall. In addition, all the classrooms and labs were refurbished. The hall, which would also serve as a canteen prior to the opening of 21 Douglas Street and space for P.E. prior to the opening of Lawrence Hall as Westminster School Sports Centre (see below), is used for theatre and drama performances by the school.

=== George House ===
George House, opposite Adrian House on 21 Douglas Street, opened in 2011 by the Dean of Westminster, the Very Reverend Dr John Hall. In 2014 it was given the name "George House". The building houses the Under School's Dining Room, Art Department, conference room, and staff meeting rooms.

=== Westminster School Sports Centre ===
In September 2012, the Royal Horticultural Society's Lawrence Hall was leased by Westminster School for 999 years, and became the School's Sports Centre. It was officially opened by HM Elizabeth II in 2015. The building is on Elverton Street.

== Houses ==
The school is organised into 4 houses, based on the charges on the Westminster Abbey, Westminster School and Westminster Under School coat of arms: Tudors (Red), Lions (Blue), Fleuries (Green) and Martlets (Yellow).

== Notable alumni ==
- Ben Adams (singer)
- Hilary Benn (MP)
- Luke McShane (chess player)
- Jacob Rees-Mogg (MP)

== See also ==
- Westminster School
