= Tristram Jones-Parry =

Head Master of Westminster School

Tristram Jones-Parry (born 23 July 1947) is a British teacher of mathematics. He was headmaster of Emanuel School (1994–1998) and Westminster School (1998–2005), two independent schools in the UK, and is currently a governor at Hampton Court House School.

== Biography ==
He was educated at Westminster School and Christ Church, Oxford.

Upon his departure from Westminster, Jones-Parry received a great amount of attachment and approval from staff and pupils. He was depicted as "an excellent leader and educator, who devoted his time entirely for the sake of education rather than to building excessive relationship with external high-society figures, who bears a warm heart under a stern appearance, who will always be remembered for picking up rubbish from the Little Dean's Yard ground." There was rumour that he was in argument with the school council over issues concerning the allocation of funds gathered from benefactors. The council thought the fund should be used for improving school facilities while he was of the opinion that the money should be provided to smart students unable to afford fees.

He became involved in media and political controversy in 2004, when on retiring from independent schools at the age of 58, after 30 years' teaching experience, applied to teach in a state school in order to "give a bit back", but was rejected by the General Teaching Council on the basis that he had not completed the PGCE teacher training course which is obligatory for teachers in the state sector but not in the independent schools, insisting also that they were obliged to apply this rule rigidly. Critics of the decision labelled it “totally absurd”, given Jones-Parry's long teaching experience in leading independent schools, and as Headmaster of Westminster - frequently cited as the most academically successful school in the country. The growing media controversy surrounding the issue, further spotlighted what many saw as a particularly onerous example of bureaucratic pedantry, leading to pressure on the then Education Secretary Charles Clarke from his own advisers to change the rules. Following a decision that the rules were necessary in order to preserve standards, the National Union of Teachers and NASUWT endorsed it, and the Teacher Training Agency stated that a fast-track route for qualified teachers already exists.

Jones-Parry was head of the innovative independent Sixth Form and is now a governor at Hampton Court House School. In 2015, Tristram Jones-Parry was interviewed on BBC Breakfast where he highlighted the benefits of later start times for teenagers.
