= Dean's Yard =

Square in the City of Westminster, England

Coordinates: 51°29′57″N 0°7′45″W

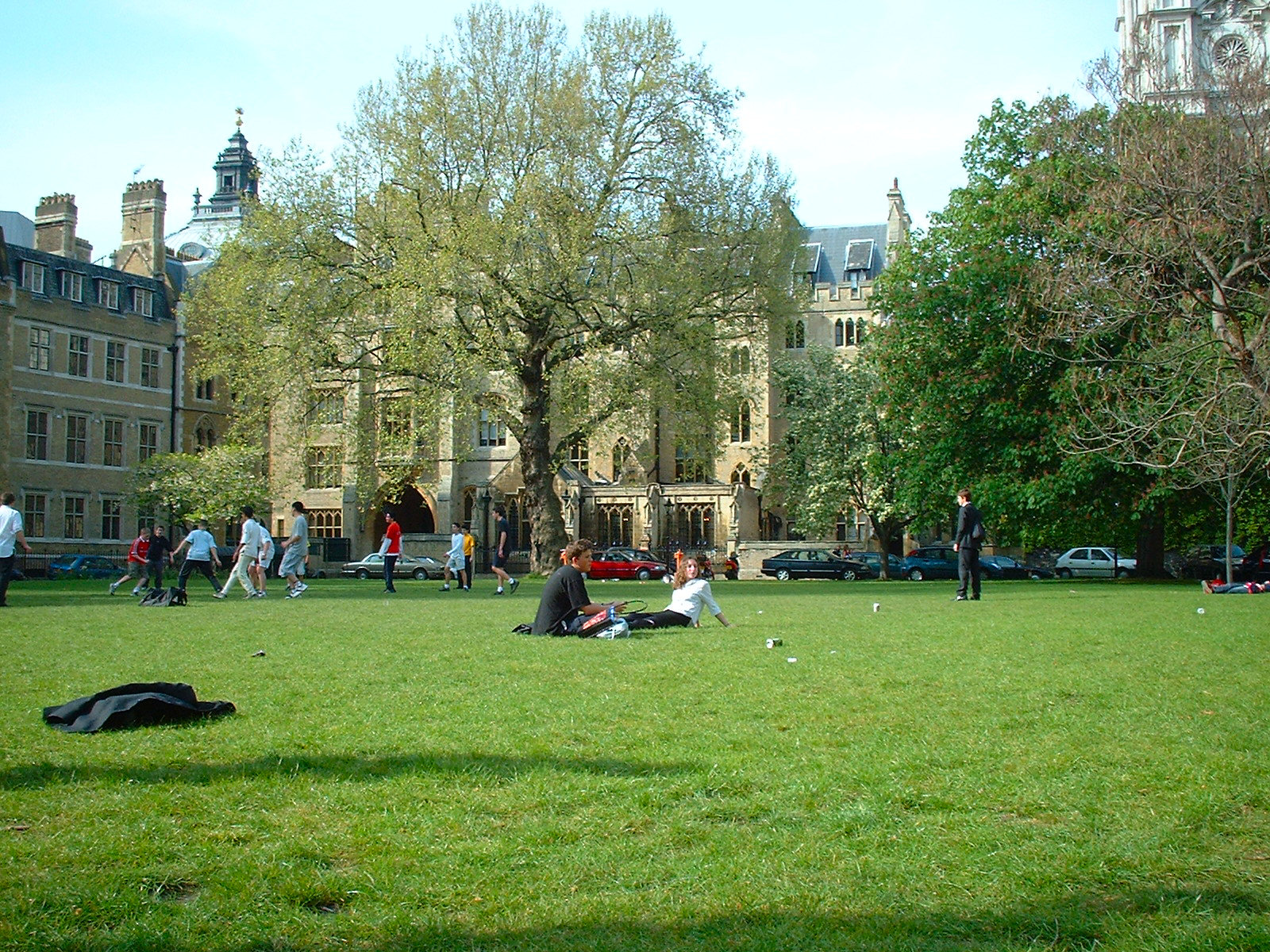
Pupils relax and play football after school on Green.

Dean's Yard, Westminster, comprises most of the remaining precincts of the historically greater scope of the monastery or abbey of Westminster, not occupied by its buildings. It is known to members of Westminster School as Green (referred to without an article). It is a large gated quadrangle, closed to public traffic, chiefly a green upon which the pupils have the long-use acquired exclusive rights to sit, read and to play games such as football (they have some claim to have invented the modern game). For some centuries until a point in the early seventeenth century it was a third of its present size, since to the south stood the Queen's Scholars' dormitory, which was in monastic times the granary. Its stones support Church House.

Adjoining buildings

- East: school buildings
- South: Church House, a conference centre and offices of the Church of England
- West: school buildings and Westminster Abbey Choir School
- North: flanking archway to the Great Sanctuary: Abbey offices and part of the Deanery.

Historically the Abbey was one of the last ecclesiastical escape sanctuaries to surrender ancient rights such as sanctuary. Over centuries, residents included many politically disfavoured and dangerous inhabitants. They were held in check by the Abbot's own penal jurisdiction, and by the knowledge that the Abbot could instantly expel them to meet their fate at the hands of common law. The Abbey Gatehouse was split into two prisons: one belonging to the Abbot and one for the constables outside. Westminster School displays a royal pardon from Charles II of England and Scotland to the King's Scholars, whose actions killed a bailiff harassing the mistress of one of them in Dean's Yard, accused by his fellow authorities of murder. Whether he was excused for reacting to the breach of some vestigial sanctuary, in stark contrast to the English Commonwealth where such rights were undeniably defunct, or for a moderate degree of violence that may have been used, such as might have resulted in a manslaughter charge were the victim not a bailiff, is unrecorded. The Abbey's Sanctuary extended beyond, as far as the north side of Parliament Square to a short approach, Thieving Lane, through which thieves were taken to the prison (see Richard II's gatehouse, Old Palace Yard) without entering sanctuary and being able to claim its immunity, but in the tenements of which prostitution took hold. HM Treasury is built upon its site, leading to accusations that thieving still continues there, especially at times of higher taxation or departmental cuts.
