= Vincent Square =

Grass-covered square in London, United Kingdom

Coordinates: 51.4932°N 0.1351°W

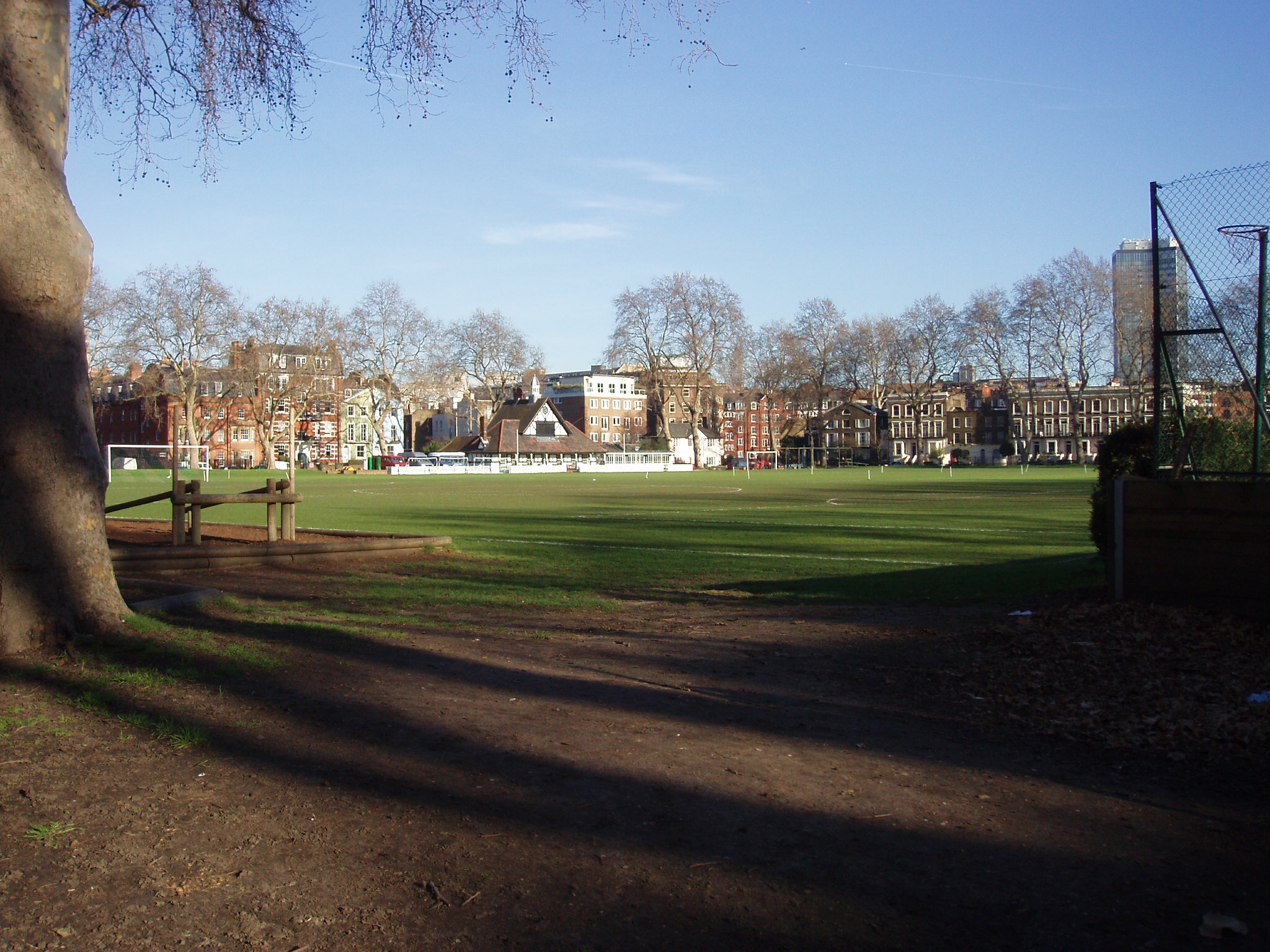
View towards the pavilion of Vincent Square, London

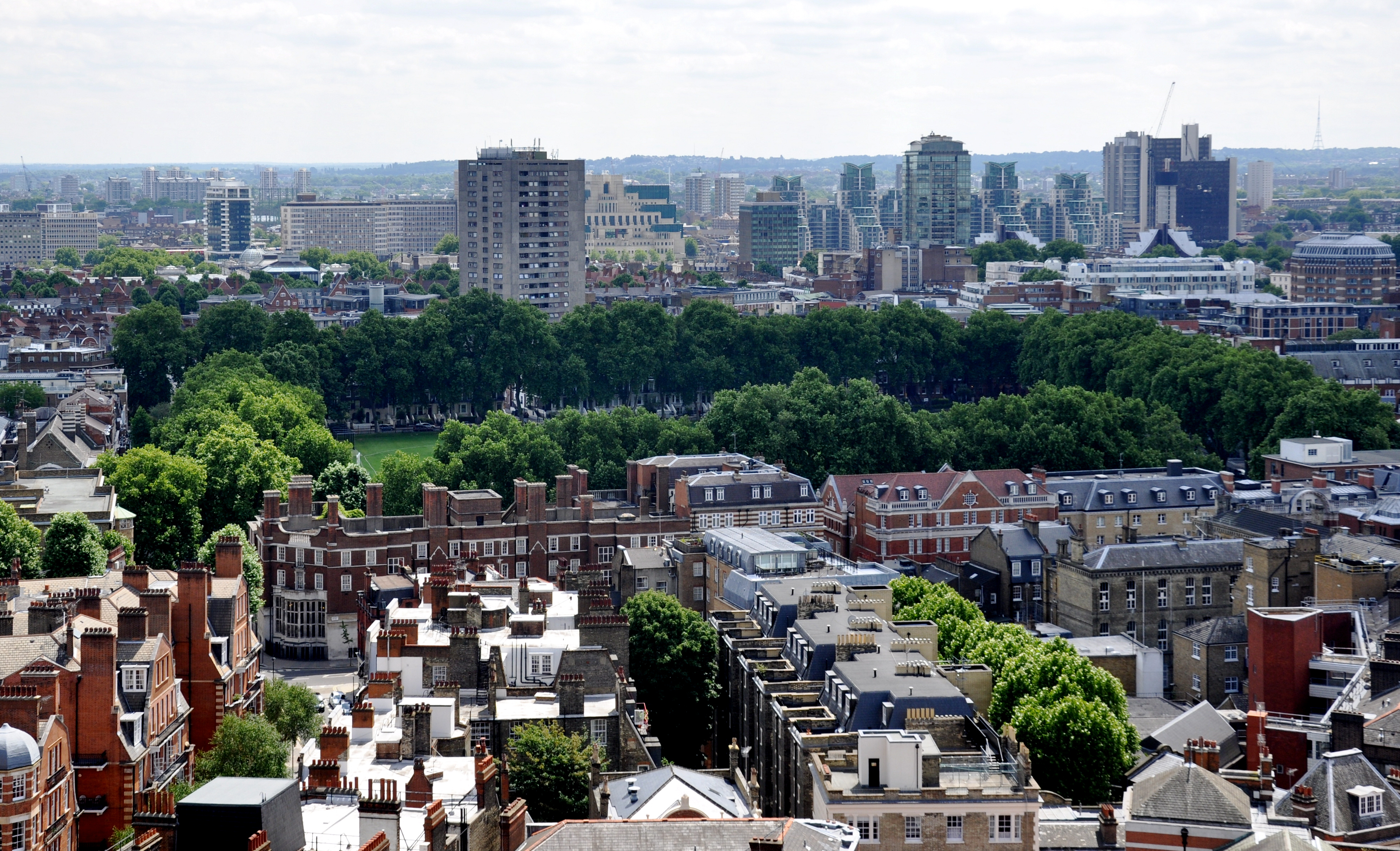
View from the tower of Westminster Cathedral towards Vincent Square

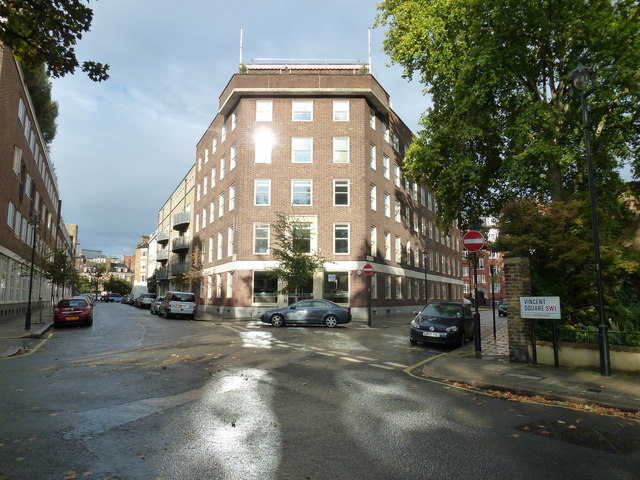
The Liberal Democrats' headquarters at 1 Vincent Square, before their 2025 move to London's Buckingham Gate

Vincent Square is a grass-covered square in Westminster, London, England. It is London's largest privately owned square, covering 13 acres, lined with mature trees including London planes. In among a network of backstreets, it chiefly provides playing fields for Westminster School, who own it absolutely; otherwise, it functions as a green lung and a view for the homes, hotel and other organisations adjoining. Nine of its adjoining buildings have been given strict statutory architectural recognition and protection. Westminster Under School, the preparatory school of the senior Westminster School, is based at 27 Vincent Square. The Liberal Democrat Headquarters, housing one of Parliament's three largest political parties, was based at 1 Vincent Square, until September 2025.

== History and use ==
It was appropriated in the 18th century on land originally known as Tothill Fields, by William Vincent, a former Dean of Westminster and headmaster of Westminster School who simply paid a man with a horse and plough to enclose the square with a mound and ditch. Previous uses include a death camp and cemetery for 1,200 Scottish prisoners starved to death after the Battle of Worcester in 1651, a large burial pit for victims of the Great Plague of London in 1665/6, a jail named Tothill Fields Bridewell, and a well-known bear-baiting den recorded in the reign of Queen Anne. The space, facing buildings and certain others surrounding form the Vincent Square Conservation Area.

The square contains a cricket pavilion, four football pitches, about 10 tennis courts, and the groundsman's house, and is used on school weekdays by Westminster Under School. Other buildings fronting the square include the headquarters of the Royal Horticultural Society. Outside of school bookings the courts host many fixtures of the Lords and Commons Tennis Club.

== Notable buildings ==
Numbering is from the east corner, clockwise (3 to 87) and applies to fewer than 87 buildings, from great mergers and additional road openings. Those listed in the initial, mainstream category of statutory recognition and protection ("Grade II listed") are:

- №s 3 and 4.
- №s 7 and 8.
- Royal Horticultural Society Old Hall (designed in 1904 by Edwin James Stubbs)
- №s 84 and 85. (terraced buildings of circa (about) 1800)
- №s 86 (a corner house of about 1800)

At rarer Grade II* level is:

- the former Westminster College

In 1981, Westminster Under School opened in the building of the former Grosvenor Hospital for Women which had closed in 1976.

== Indirect use ==
Vincent Square lends its name to a current electoral ward of the local authority, Westminster City Council. Its bounds are thus drawn up for approximately equal representation of the electorate. At the 2011 Census its population was 9,988.

== Notable residents ==
- Liberal Democrats
- Richard Crossman
- Charles Hamilton Fasson
- Robert Jenrick
- Duncan Sandys
- Robert Vansittart, 1st Baron Vansittart
- James Watson
- Harold Wilson

== See also ==
- List of eponymous roads in London
