= Westminster School =

Private school in Westminster, England

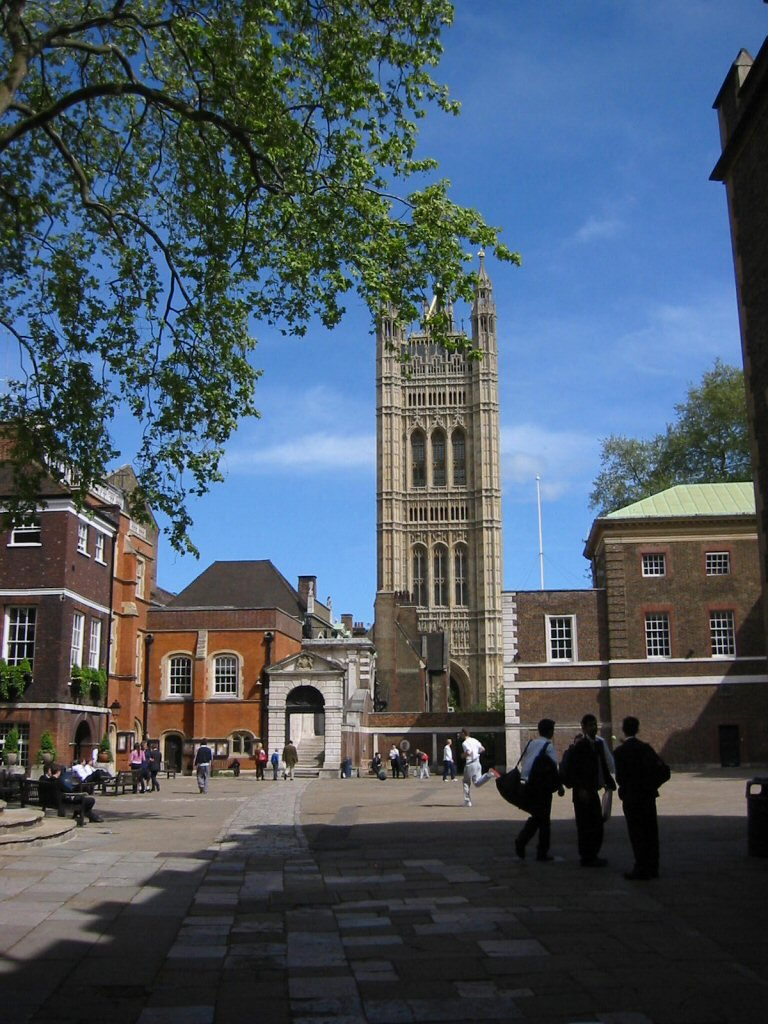

Location
- Little Dean's Yard; London, SW1P 3PF; England; 51.4984°N 0.1284°W

Information
- Type: Public school Private day and boarding school
- Motto: Latin: Dat Deus Incrementum (God Gives the Increase)
- Religious affiliation: Church of England
- Established: Earliest records date from the 14th century, refounded in 1560
- Founder: Henry VIII (1541); Elizabeth I (1560 – refoundation)
- Local authority: City of Westminster
- Department for Education URN: 101162 Tables
- Chairman of Governors: Mark Batten
- Head Master: Gary Savage
- Staff: 105
- Gender: Boys; Coeducational (Sixth Form)
- Age: 13 (boys), 16 (girls) to 18
- Enrolment: 778
- Student to teacher ratio: 7:1
- Houses: Ashburnham; Busby's; College; Dryden's; Grant's; Hakluyt's; Liddell's; Milne's; Purcell's; Rigaud's; Wren's
- Colour: Pink
- Publication: The Elizabethan
- Budget: £42,611,000 (2024)
- Revenue: £42,535,000 (2024)
- Affiliations: Eton Group; HMC
- Alumni: Old Westminsters ("OWs")
- Website: www.westminster.org.uk

Westminster School is a private school in Westminster, London, England, in the precincts of Westminster Abbey. It descends from a charity school founded by Westminster Benedictines before the Norman Conquest, as documented by the Croyland Chronicle and a charter of King Offa. Continuous existence is clear from the early 14th century. Westminster was one of nine schools examined by the 1861 Clarendon Commission and reformed by the Public Schools Act 1868. The school motto, Dat Deus Incrementum, quotes 1 Corinthians 3:6: "I planted the seed... but God made it grow." The school owns playing fields and tennis courts in the centre of the 13-acre (5-hectare) Vincent Square, besides which Westminster Under School is also situated.

Its academic results place it among the top schools nationally; about half its students go to Oxbridge, giving it the highest national Oxbridge acceptance rate. In the 2023 A-levels, the school saw 82.3% of its candidates score A* or A. The school is included in The Schools Index of the world's 150 best private schools and among top 30 senior schools in the UK. Among its graduates are three Nobel laureates: Edgar Adrian (Nobel Prize for Physiology in 1932), Sir Andrew Huxley (likewise in 1963) and Sir Richard Stone (Nobel Prize in Economics in 1984). During the mid-17th century, the liberal philosopher of the Enlightenment, John Locke, attended the school, and seven UK prime ministers also then attended, all belonging to the Whig or Liberal factions of British politics: Henry Pelham and his brother Thomas Pelham-Holmes, Charles Watson-Wentworth, James Waldegrave, Augustus Fitzroy, William Cavendish-Bentinck, and John Russell.

From September 2026 boys and girls may join the Under School at four, seven and 11 and the Senior School at 13 if they pass their examinations. Currently girls join the Sixth Form at 16 but may join at 13 from 2028 with the school becoming fully co-educational from 2030. About a quarter of the 750 pupils board. Weekly boarders may go home after Saturday morning school.

== History ==
=== Medieval origins ===
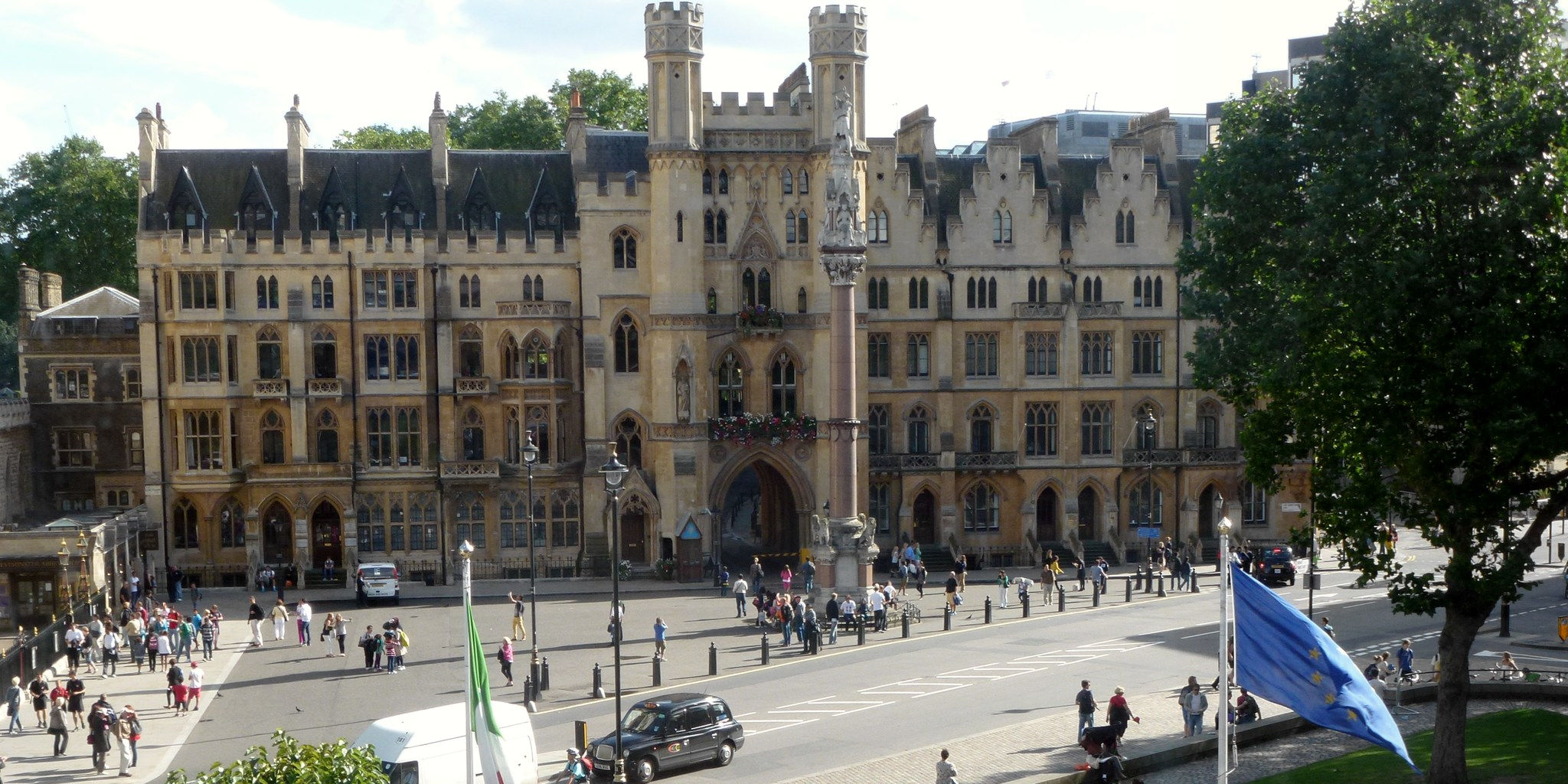
The entrance to Dean's Yard and Westminster School war memorial viewed from the Queen Elizabeth II Conference Centre in August 2012

The earliest records of a school at Westminster date back to the 1340s and are held in Westminster Abbey's Muniment Room. Parts of the buildings now used by the school date back to the tenth-century Anglo-Saxon abbey at Westminster.

=== Henry VIII ===
In 1540, Henry VIII ordered the dissolution of the monasteries in England, including that of the powerful Abbots of Westminster, but personally ensured the School's survival by his royal charter. The Royal College of St. Peter carried on with forty "King's Scholars" financed from the royal purse. By this point Westminster School had certainly become a public school (i.e. a school available to members of the paying public, rather than the private tuition arranged by the nobility). During Mary I's reign the Abbey was reinstated as a Roman Catholic monastery, but the school continued.

=== Refoundation under Elizabeth I ===
Elizabeth I refounded the school in 1560, with new statutes to select 40 King's Scholars from boys who had attended the school for a year. Queen Elizabeth frequently visited her scholars, although she never signed the statutes or endowed her scholarships; 1560 is now generally taken as the date that the school was "founded". Elizabeth I appointed William Camden as Head Master, and he is the only layman known to have held the position until 1937.

=== 17th century ===
It was Richard Busby, himself an Old Westminster, who established the reputation of the school for several hundred years, as much by his classical learning as for his ruthless discipline by the birch, immortalised in Pope's Dunciad. Busby prayed publicly up School for the safety of the Crown, on the very day of Charles I's execution, and then locked the boys inside to prevent their going to watch the spectacle a few hundred yards away. Regardless of politics, he thrashed Royalist and Puritan boys alike without fear or favour. Busby also took part in Oliver Cromwell's funeral procession in 1658, when a Westminster schoolboy, Robert Uvedale, succeeded in snatching the "Majesty Scutcheon" (white satin banner) draped on the coffin, which is now held in the library (it was given to the school by his family three hundred years later). Busby remained in office throughout the Civil War and the Commonwealth, when the school was governed by Parliamentary Commissioners, and well into the Restoration.

In 1679, a group of scholars killed a bailiff, ostensibly in defence of Abbey's traditional right of sanctuary after the man had arrested a person connected to the college. Busby obtained a royal pardon for his scholars from Charles II and added the cost to the school bills.

Distinguished alumni in this period include John Locke and William Godophin.

=== 19th century ===
Until the 19th century, the curriculum was predominantly made up of Latin and Greek, and all taught up School. Westminster boys were uncontrolled outside school hours and notoriously unruly about town, but the proximity of the school to the Palace of Westminster meant that politicians were well aware of boys' exploits. After the Public Schools Act 1868, in response to the Clarendon Commission on the financial and other malpractices at nine pre-eminent public schools, the school began to approach its modern form. It was legally separated from the Abbey, although the organisations remain close. The Dean of Westminster was ex officio the Chair of the Governing Body until 2020 and remains a Governor. There followed a scandalous public and parliamentary dispute lasting a further 25 years, to settle the transfer of the properties from the Canons of the Abbey to the school. School statutes have been made by Order in Council of Queen Elizabeth II. The Dean of Christ Church, Oxford, and the Master of Trinity College, Cambridge, were also ex officio members of the school's Governing Body until 2020.

Unusually among public schools, Westminster did not adopt most of the broader changes associated with the Victorian ethos of Thomas Arnold, such as the emphasis on team over individual spirit, and the school retained much of its distinctive character.

=== 20th century ===
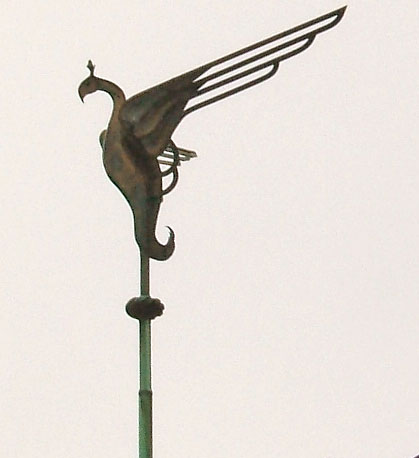
The phoenix which was placed on the roof of the school in the 1950s to commemorate the school's resurgence after World War II

Despite many pressures, including evacuation and the destruction of the school roof during the Blitz, the school refused to permanently move out of the city, unlike other schools such as Charterhouse and St. Paul's, and remains in its central London location. From 1940 to 1945 the school was evacuated to Bromyard in Herefordshire. Westminster Under School was formed in 1943 in the evacuated school buildings in Westminster, as a distinct preparatory school for day pupils between the ages of eight to 13 (now seven to 13). Only the separation is new: for example, in the 18th century, Edward Gibbon attended Westminster from the age of 11 and Jeremy Bentham from the age of eight. The Under School has since moved to Vincent Square, overlooking the school's playing fields. Its current Master is Kate Jefferson.

In 1967, the first female pupil was admitted to the school. Girls became full members in 1973. In 1981, a single-sex boarding house, Purcell's, was created for girls. In 1997 the school expanded further with the creation of a new day house, Milne's, at 5a, Dean's Yard.

=== 21st century ===
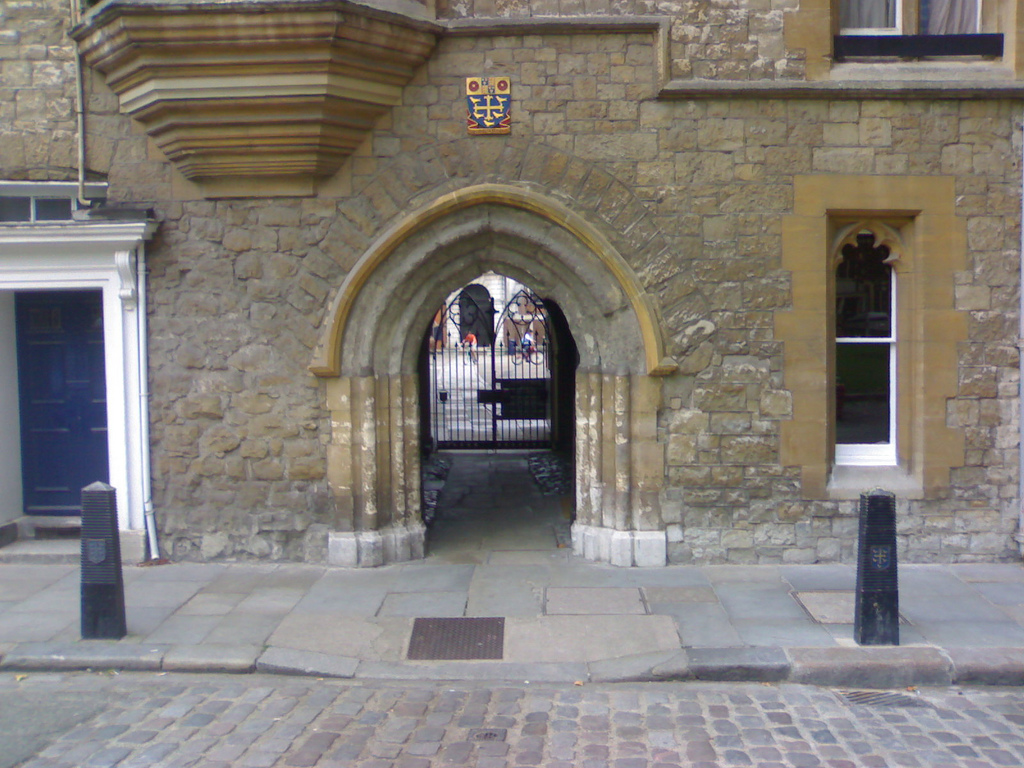
Liddell's arch, the main entrance to Little Dean's Yard

In 2005 the school was one of 50 leading independent schools found guilty of running a cartel, exposed by The Times, which had allowed them to collaborate in uncompetitive fees for thousands of customers. Jean Scott, the head of the Independent Schools Council, said that independent schools had always been exempt from anti-cartel rules applied to business, were following a long-established procedure in sharing the information with each other, and that they were unaware of the change to the law (on which they had not been consulted). She wrote to John Vickers, the OFT director-general, saying, "They are not a group of businessmen meeting behind closed doors to fix the price of their products to the disadvantage of the consumer. They are schools that have quite openly continued to follow a long-established practice because they were unaware that the law had changed.". However, each school agreed to pay a nominal penalty of £10,000 and ex-gratia payments totalling £3 million into a trust designed to benefit pupils who attended the schools during the period in respect of which fee information was shared.

In 2007, the school responded to an invitation to become the sponsor of Pimlico School, which was due to be rebuilt as an academy, but decided not to do so after Westminster City Council developed its plans. In 2013 the school collaborated with the Harris Federation to set up a selective, mixed sixth-form academy, with entrance priority being given to those from disadvantaged backgrounds. Harris Westminster Sixth Form opened nearby in 2014; pupils of the academy share some lessons and facilities of the school.

In 2010 the school and the abbey celebrated the 450th anniversary of the granting of their royal charter and Elizabeth I's refoundation of the school in 1560. Queen Elizabeth II with the Duke of Edinburgh unveiled a controversial statue in Little Dean's Yard of the Queen's namesake Elizabeth I, the nominal foundress of the School, by Old Westminster sculptor Matthew Spender. The head of the statue came off in May 2016 after a Sixth Former (a pupil in Year 12) tried to climb onto the statue. The head has since been reattached.

In 2011, the school agreed to buy a 999-year lease of Lawrence Hall, London from The Royal Horticultural Society. This listed Art-Deco building adjacent to the school's playing fields at Vincent Square has been converted into a Sports Centre. It provides for climbing, martial arts, fencing, rowing, table tennis, badminton, netball, indoor football and indoor cricket. In 2012 the school took possession of St Edward's House, which was the last Anglican monastery in London. The building, on the corner of Great College Street and Tufton Street, now houses Purcell's, a Boarding House for girls and a Day House for boys, as well as a small Chapel and Refectory. Westminster Under School has also been enlarged by a building in Douglas Street, which provides an Art Studio, IT Suite and Dining Hall and has recently modernised a new school building in Chapter Street.

In May 2013, the school was criticized for staging an auction involving the selling of internships to fund bursaries, resulting in adverse press coverage.

In 2014/2015 Westminster was reported to be the 13th most expensive HMC day school and tenth most expensive HMC boarding school in the UK It achieved the highest percentage of students accepted by Oxbridge colleges over the period 2002–2006, and was ranked as best boys' school in the country in terms of GCSE results in 2017. In 2019, 84% of pupils scored A*-A for their A-Levels examination, while 80% scored A*-A for their GCSEs.

In December 2017, the school announced plans to open six schools in China, working with the Hong Kong educational group HKMETG; the first opened in Chengdu in 2020. Revenue generated by the deal will be used to support bursary funds at the existing school, and follows similar moves by Harrow School, Malvern School, Wellington College and Dulwich College. The school was criticized in the media and by its pupils for its decision to teach the Chinese national curriculum as opposed to an international curriculum normally taught by international schools. Steve Tsang, director of the China Institute at SOAS London, was quoted in the Financial Times as saying, "I think they have no idea what they're dealing with.... If you set up a school in China, they will have a party secretary superintending the whole school and the party secretary will be responsible for political education." The school responded that it would exercise "soft power" over the teaching and would also teach an international curriculum for students aged 16–18. The issue was re-opened when The Times published an article quoting Professor Edward Vickers of Kyushu University, who accused the school (and King's College School, with similar plans) of "helping Chinese teach propaganda". These plans were cancelled in November 2021 in response to "recent changes in Chinese education policy".

In 2028 The school plans to introduce girls into Year 9. It will be co-educational in all year groups by 2030.

== Architecture ==
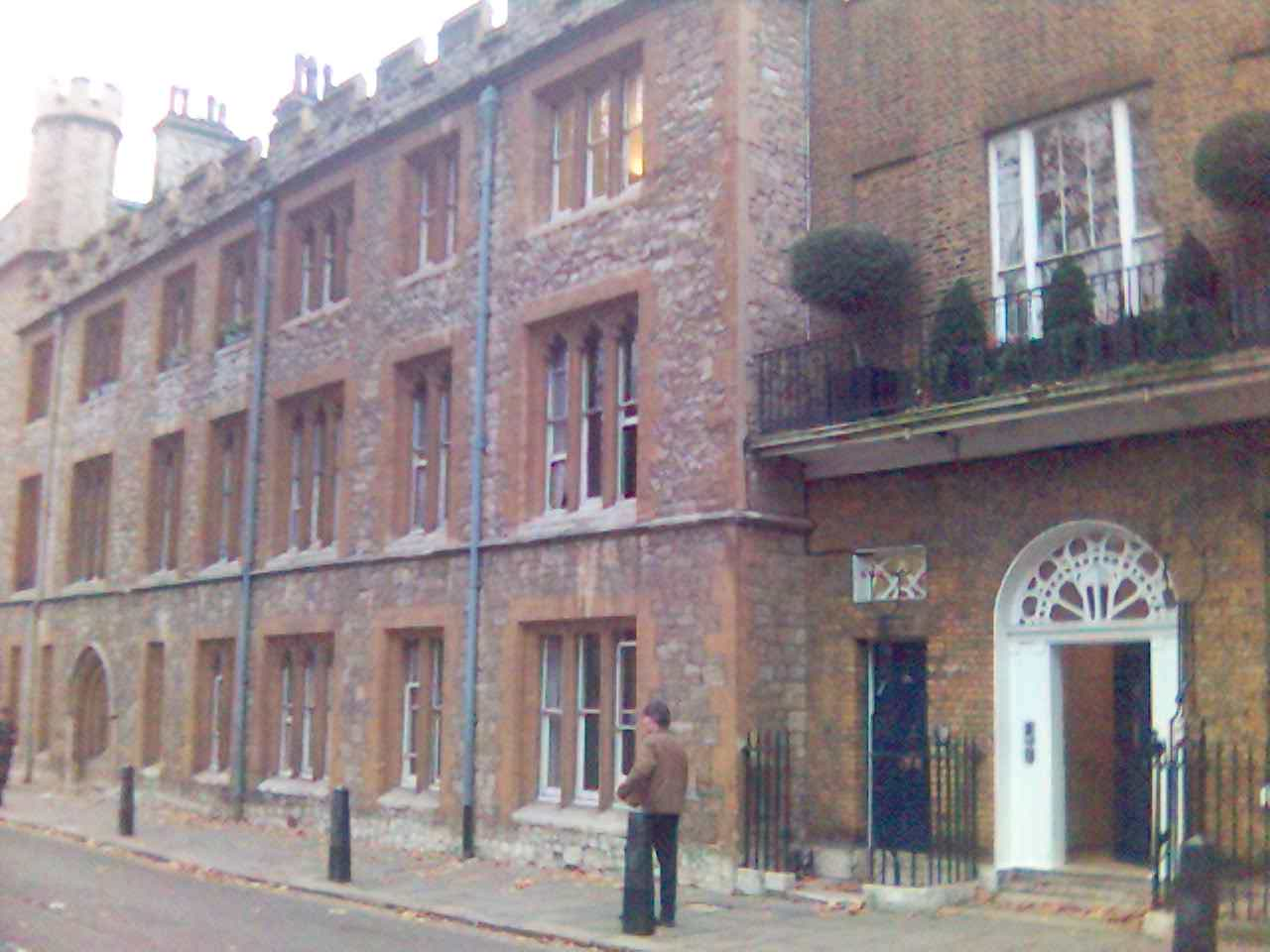
Liddell's House, and the school reception, taken from Dean's Yard

Westminster School, in the middle of the UNESCO World Heritage Site of Westminster Abbey, St. Margaret's, and the Palace of Westminster, has several buildings notable for qualities, age and history. The school stands mainly in the precincts of the medieval monastery of Westminster Abbey, its main buildings surrounding its private square Little Dean's Yard (known as Yard), off Dean's Yard, where Church House, the headquarters of the Church of England, is situated, along with some of the houses, the common room, the humanities building Weston's, and College Hall.

=== Sutcliff's ===
Just outside the abbey precincts in Great College Street is Sutcliff's (named after the tuck shop on the site of the building in the 19th century), where Geography, Art, Theology, Philosophy and Classics (Latin and Ancient Greek) are taught. The Robert Hooke Science Centre is further away, just off Smith Square. As part of an expansion programme funded by donations and a legacy from A. A. Milne, the school has acquired the nearby Millicent Fawcett Hall for Drama and Theatre Studies lessons and performances; the Manoukian Centre for Music Lessons (timetabled and private) and recitals; and the Weston Building at 3 Dean's Yard. It often uses St John's, Smith Square as a venue for major musical concerts.

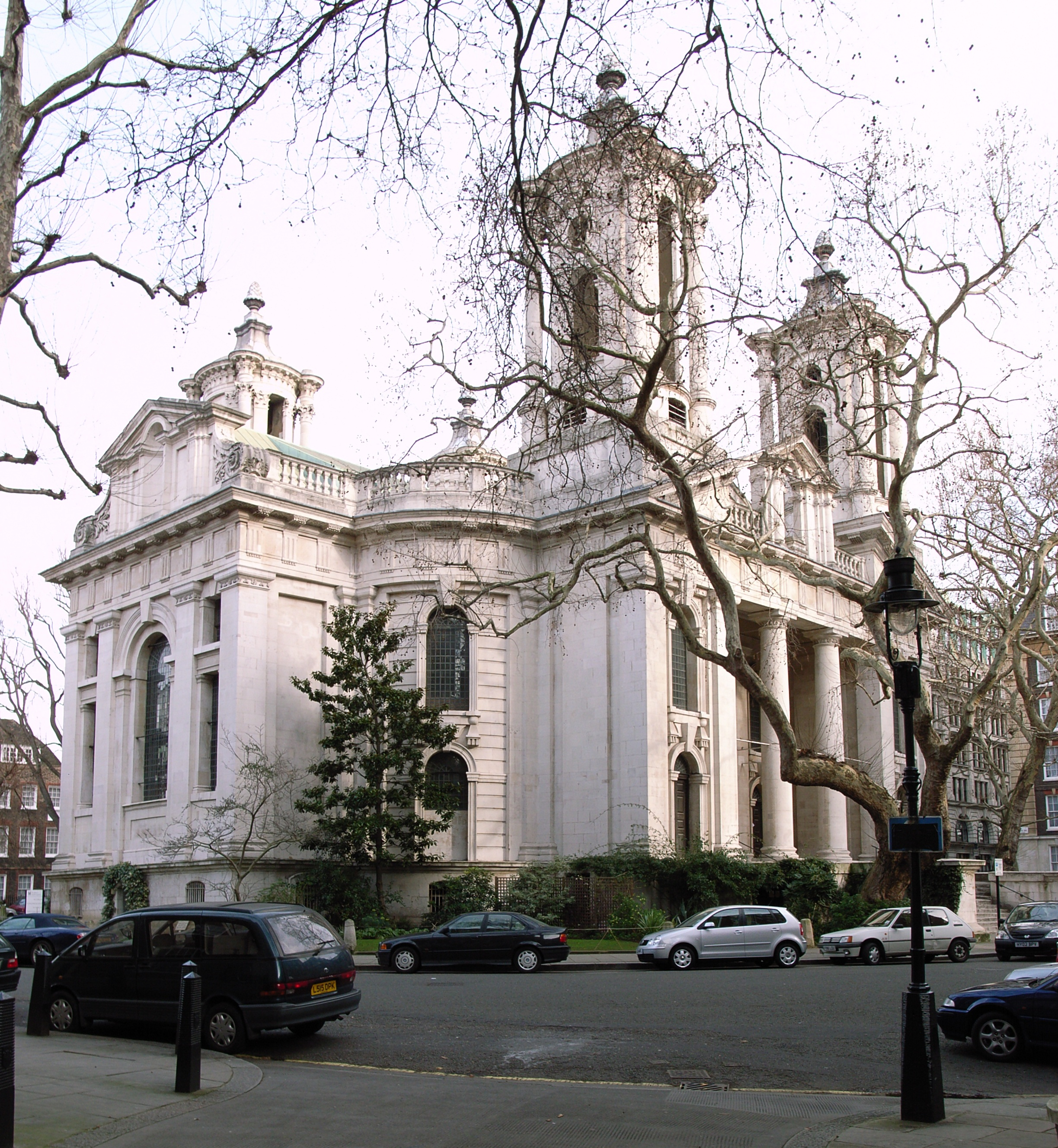
The School often uses St John's, Smith Square as a venue for major musical concerts.

=== College Garden ===
College Garden, to the East of Little Dean's Yard, is believed to be the oldest garden in England, under continuous cultivation for about a millennium. Just beyond rises the Victoria Tower of the Houses of Parliament; the King's Scholars have special rights of access to the House of Commons. To the North, the Dark Cloister leads straight to the Abbey, which serves as the School Chapel.

=== Playing Fields and Boathouse ===
The playing fields are half a mile away at Vincent Square, which Dean Vincent created for the school by hiring a horse and plough to carve 10 acres (4 hectares) out of the open Tothill Fields. The boathouse is now some way from the school at Putney, where it is also used for the Oxford and Cambridge boat race; but the school's First Eight still returns annually to exercise its traditional right to land at Black Rod Steps of the Palace of Westminster.

=== Cloisters ===
The Great Cloisters, St Faith's Chapel, The Chapter House, The Parlour, 1 and 2 The Cloisters, and the dormitory with the Chapel of St Dunstan are listed Grade I as a group on the National Heritage List for England.

=== Dormitory at Little Dean's Yard ===
The dormitory at Little Dean's Yard and the staircase and doorway in Little Dean's Yard to the Busby Library are separately listed Grade I.

=== College Hall ===
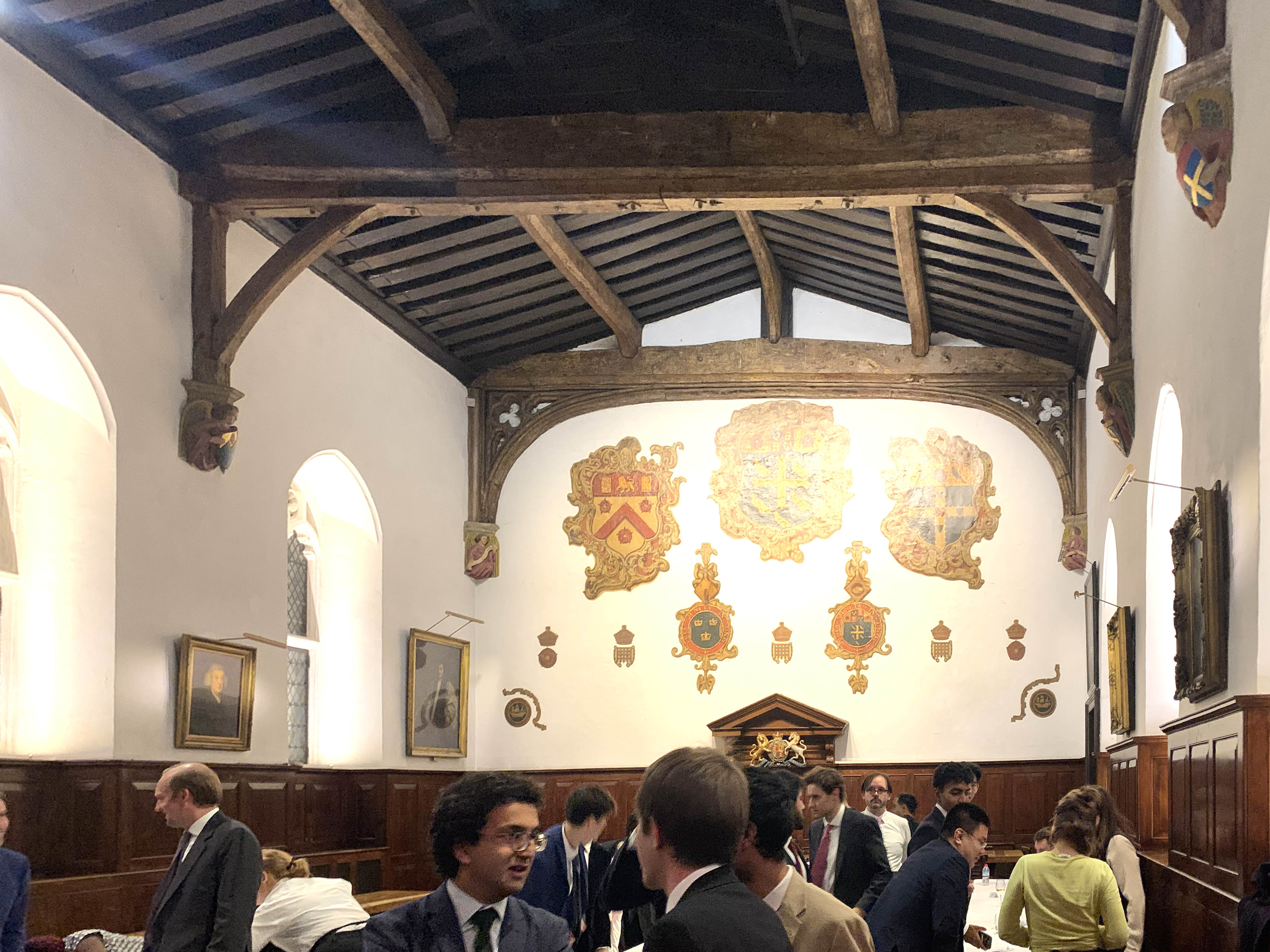
College Hall

College Hall, the 14th-century abbot's state dining hall, is one of the oldest and finest examples of a medieval refectory and still in daily use for that purpose in term-time; outside of term it reverts to the dean as the abbot's successor. Queen Elizabeth Woodville took sanctuary here in 1483 with five daughters and her son Richard of Shrewsbury, Duke of York, but failed to save him from his fate as one of the Princes in the Tower. In the 1560s, Elizabeth I several times came to see her scholars act their Latin plays on a stage in front of the attractive Elizabethan gallery, which may have been first erected especially for the purpose.

=== College ===
College, now shared between the three Houses of College, Dryden's and Wren's, is a dressed stone building overlooking College Garden, the former monastery's Infirmary garden, which is still the property of the Collegiate Church of Westminster Abbey. College dates from 1729 and was designed by the Earl of Burlington, based on earlier designs by Sir Christopher Wren (himself an Old Westminster).

=== School ===
School, known as "Up School", originally built in the 1090s as the monks' dormitory, is the school's main hall, used for Latin Prayers (a weekly assembly with prayers in the Westminster dialect of Latin), exams, and large concerts, plays and the like. From 1599 it was used to teach all the pupils, the Upper and Lower Schools being separated by a curtain hung from a 16th-century pig iron bar, which remains the largest piece of pig iron in the world. The panelling "up School" is painted with the coats of arms of many former pupils. The original shell-shaped apse at the north end of the school gave its name to the 'Shell' forms taught there and the corresponding classes at many other public schools. The current shell displays a Latin epigram on the rebuilding of School, with the acrostic Semper Eadem, Elizabeth I's motto. The classroom door to the right of the Shell was recovered from the notorious Star Chamber at its demolition, but was destroyed during the Blitz. The building lies directly on top of the Westminster Abbey museum in the Norman Undercroft, and ends at the start of the Pyx Chamber. Both School and College had their roofs destroyed by incendiary bombs in the Blitz of 1941. They were re-opened by George VI in 1950.

=== Gateway ===
The school gateway was also designed by the Earl of Burlington. It is engraved with the names of many pupils, who used to hire a stonemason for the purpose.

=== Ashburnham ===
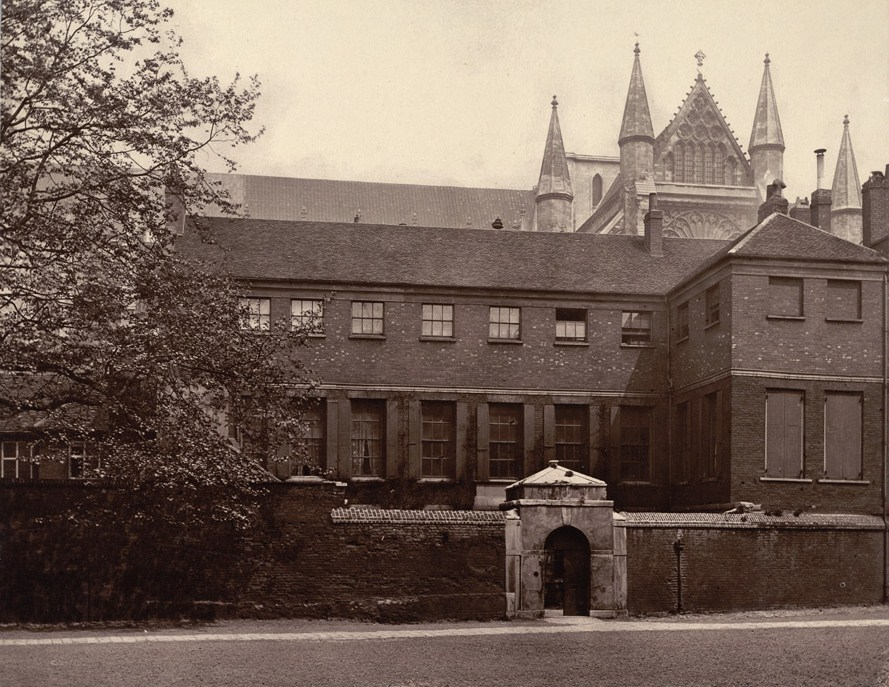
Ashburnham House, as seen in 1880

Ashburnham House, not to be confused with the similarly named house, houses the library and the Mathematics Department, and until 2005 accommodated the Economics, English and History of Art departments as well. Ashburnham House may have been built by Inigo Jones or his pupil John Webb around the time of the Restoration, as a London seat for the family, who became the Earls of Ashburnham. It incorporates remains of the mediaeval Prior's House. Its garden is the site of the monks' refectory and some of the earliest sittings of the House of Commons.

In 1731 when Ashburnham housed the King's and Cottonian libraries, which form the basis of the British Library, there was a disastrous fire, and many of the books and manuscripts still show the marks. After the Public Schools Act 1868 there was a scandalous parliamentary and legal battle between the Dean and Chapter of Westminster Abbey and the School until the School eventually obtained Ashburnham House under the Act for £4,000. The dispute was reported in The Times and it was suggested by Thomas Wise, Secretary of The Society for the Protection of Ancient Buildings that the property was "in danger of being pulled down or of being virtually destroyed by being converted into a boarding-house in connexion with Westminster School", adding that the "house is admirably suited for a residence for the Dean or one of the Canons, and is totally unfitted for a school or a boarding house." The school responded: "The Chapter themselves have in past years greatly altered and disfigured Ashburnham-house. It had originally two wings; one was destroyed and never restored. About 1848 the roof was taken off, a story added, and a dome in the ceiling of the drawing-room demolished, the external elevation being ruined. The house now has no beauty externally, and hardly any features of interest internally, except the staircase, which in any case would be preserved". On 28 November William Morris also became involved in the campaign, writing a letter to the editor of The Daily News. In the event, the school demolished the adjacent Turle's House and renovated sections of the east wing, but left the staircase and drawing room untouched.

During the Second World War, the library was used for military purposes and as an American soldiers' club, the Churchill Club.

== Customs ==
=== The Greaze ===
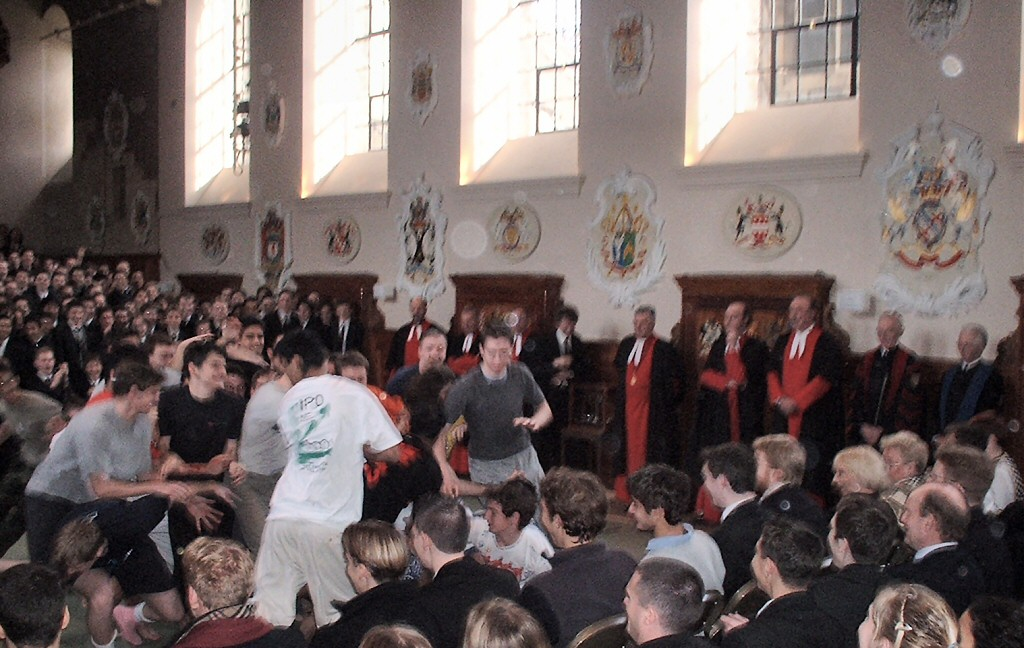
Pupils fight for the pancake (left), watched by the Dean of Westminster and the Head Master (right). The set of scales determines the winner.

The Greaze has been held "up School" (in the School Hall) on Shrove Tuesday since at least 1753. The head cook ceremoniously tosses a horsehair-reinforced pancake over a high bar, which was used from the 16th century to curtain off the Under School from the Great School. Members of the school fight for the pancake for one minute, watched over by the Dean of Westminster, the Head Master, and the upper year groups of the school and distinguished or even occasionally royal visitors. The pupil who gets the largest weight is awarded a gold sovereign (promptly redeemed for use next year), and the Dean begs for a half-holiday for the whole school. Weighing scales are on hand in the event of a dispute. A cook who failed to get the pancake over the bar after three attempts would formerly have been "booked" or pelted with Latin primers, but that tradition has long lapsed.

=== Coronation ===
The privilege of being the first commoners to acclaim each new sovereign at their coronation in Westminster Abbey is reserved for the King's (or Queen's) Scholars. Their shouts of "Vivat Rex/Regina" ("Long live the king/queen!") are incorporated into the coronation anthem "I was glad" by Hubert Parry. The tradition dates back to the coronation of King James II.

=== Commemoration of Benefactors ("Commem") ===
The School commemorates its benefactors every year with a service in Westminster Abbey in Latin in which the Captain of the King's Scholars lays a wreath of pink roses on the tomb of Elizabeth I: the service alternates between Little Commem, held in Henry VII's Chapel and involving just the King's Scholars, and the Big Commem, to which the whole school community is invited.

=== House of Commons gallery ===
The King's Scholars have privileged access to the House of Commons gallery, said to be a compromise recorded in the Standing Orders of the House in the 19th century, to stop the boys from climbing into the Palace over the roofs.

=== Latin prayers ===
Despite the formal separation from the abbey, the school remains Anglican, with services in the abbey attended by the entire school at least twice a week, and many other voluntary-attendance services of worship. The school was expressly exempted by the Act of Uniformity to allow it to continue saying Latin prayers despite the Reformation. Every Wednesday there is an assembly Up School known as Latin Prayers, which opens with the Head Master leading all members of the school in chanting prayers in Latin, followed by notices in English. The school's unique pronunciation of formal Latin is known as "Westminster Latin", and descends from medieval English scholastic pronunciation: Queen Elizabeth I, who spoke fluent Latin, commanded that Latin was not to be said "in the monkish fashion", a significant warning upon loyalties between Church and State.

=== Latin plays ===
Since the monastic Christmas revels of medieval times, Latin plays have been presented by Scholars, with a prologue and witty epilogue on contemporary events. Annual plays, "either tragedy or comedy", were required by the school statutes in 1560, and some early plays were acted in College Hall before Elizabeth I and her whole Council. However, in a more prudish age, Queen Victoria did not accompany Prince Albert and the Prince of Wales to the play, and recorded in her diary that it was "very Improper". Today, the play is put on less frequently, any members of the school may take part, and the Master of the King's Scholars gives the Latin prologue. The 1938 play caused a diplomatic incident, with the German ambassador withdrawing after being offended by the words Magna Germania figuring in extenso on a map of Europe displayed.

=== Language ===
There is a Westminster jargon little known to the general public:

- Years 9, 10, 11, 12, and 13 are called Fifth Form, Lower Shell, Upper Shell, Sixth Form and Remove, respectively.
- 'Green' is Dean's Yard.
- 'Yard' is Little Dean's Yard.
- 'School' is the main school hall, where Latin Prayers, exams and major plays and talks take place.
- 'Sanctuary' is the area outside the Great West Door of the Abbey off Broad Sanctuary.
- 'Fields' is Vincent Square.
- The preposition "up" is used to mean "at" or "towards" (hence up School). At my house (boarding/day) and home can be differentiated thus, up House means at School and at my house means at home.
- 'Station' is sport.
- 'Water' is rowing.

== Station ==
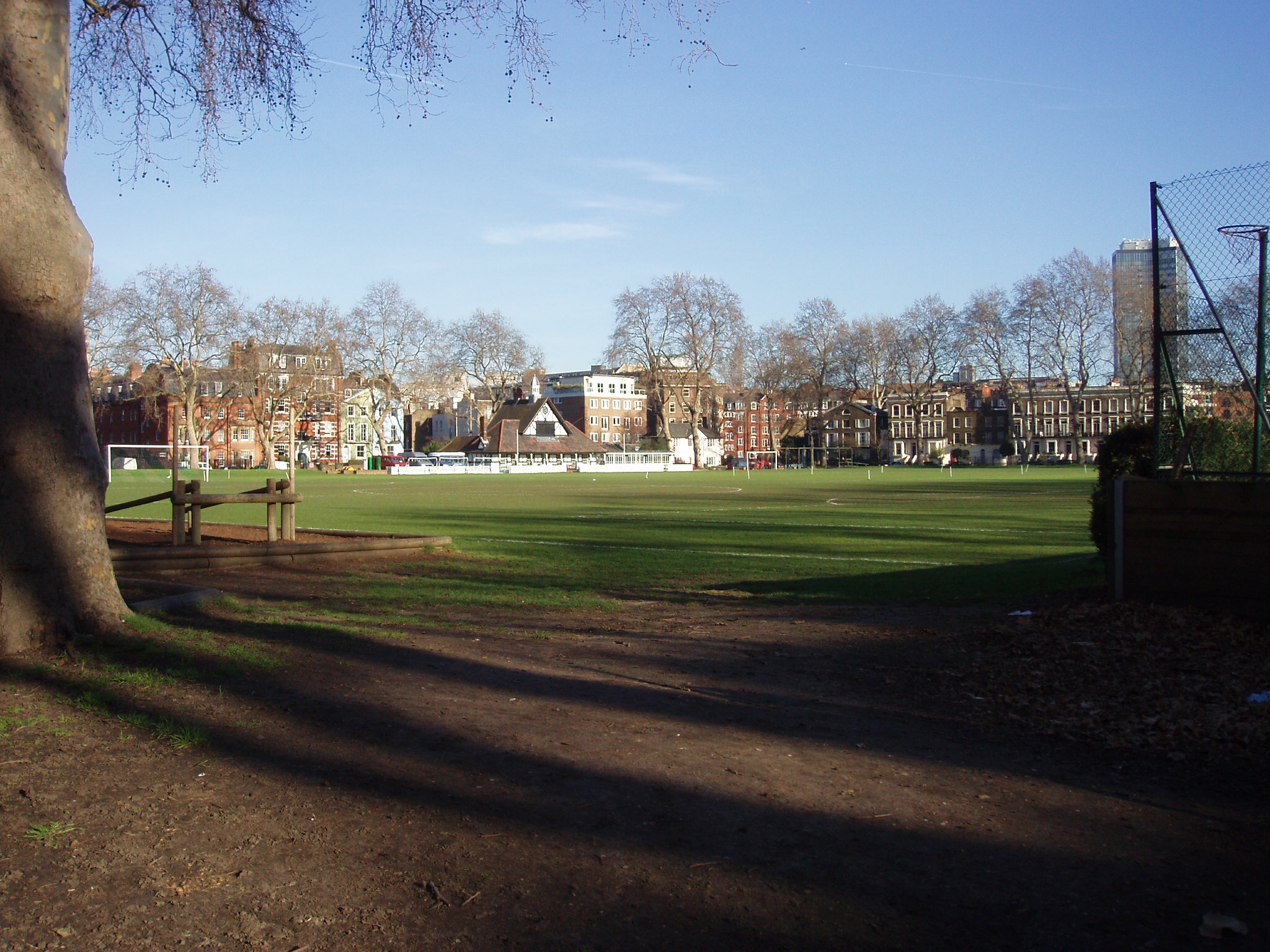
The school playing fields in Vincent Square

Since 1810, when the Head Master, William Vincent, fenced off and ordered the ploughing of the waste marshlands known as Tothill Fields for use by the school, which were being threatened by London's urban sprawl, the school's main sports ground has been nearby at Vincent Square, with football and cricket on the main area and tennis and netball on the courts; it also hosts a playground for Westminster Under School. At 13 acres (5 hectares), it is the largest private, open green space in Central London. The school also hires or owns other sporting facilities near the school. These include the oldest boating club in the world, an astroturf ground in Battersea, and the Queen Mother Sports Centre, home to a variety of sports. "Green" (Dean's Yard) is also used, as well as the three Eton Fives courts in Ashburnham Garden, behind Ashburnham House.

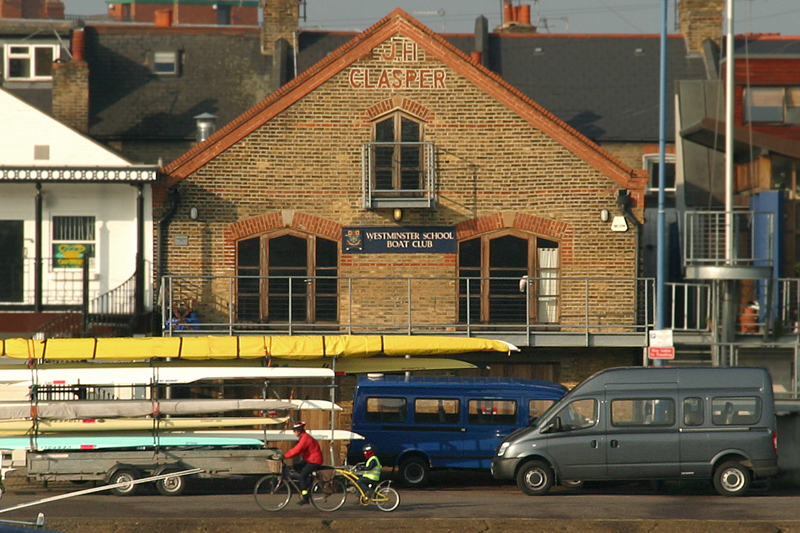
Westminster School Boat Club's boathouse in Putney

Westminster School Boat Club is the oldest rowing club in the world, located on the River Thames. The Oxford University Boat Club uses Westminster's boathouse at Putney as its HQ for the annual Oxford and Cambridge boat race on the Thames. The boathouse was remodelled in 1997 and won a Wandsworth design award in 1999. The school's colour is pink; Westminster rowers raced Eton College for the right to wear the colour. The premier Leander Club at Henley, founded in London by a number of Old Westminster rowers, later adopted it, although they call the colour cerise. The only problems arise when racing against Abingdon School, whose team also wears pink.

Westminster played in the first school cricket match against Charterhouse School in 1794 and from 1796 played cricket against Eton.

Westminster has a historic joint claim to a major role in developing Association Football. During the 1840s at both Westminster and Charterhouse, pupils' surroundings meant they were confined to playing their football in the cloisters, making the rough and tumble of the handling game that was developing at other schools such as Rugby impossible, and necessitating a new code of rules. On 24 November 1858, Westminster played Dingley Dell at Vincent Square in the earliest known football fixture in the London area (Dingley Dell was the most active non-school team in the London area in the five years before the Football Association was established in 1863). During the formulation of the rules of Association Football in the 1860s, representatives of Westminster School and Charterhouse also pushed for a passing game, in particular rules that allowed forward passing ("passing on"). Other schools (in particular Eton College, Harrow, and Shrewsbury School) favoured a dribbling game with a tight off-side rule. By 1867 the Football Association had chosen in favour of the Westminster and Charterhouse game and adopted an off-side rule that permitted forward passing. The modern forward-passing game was a direct consequence of Westminster and Charterhouse football.

== Houses ==
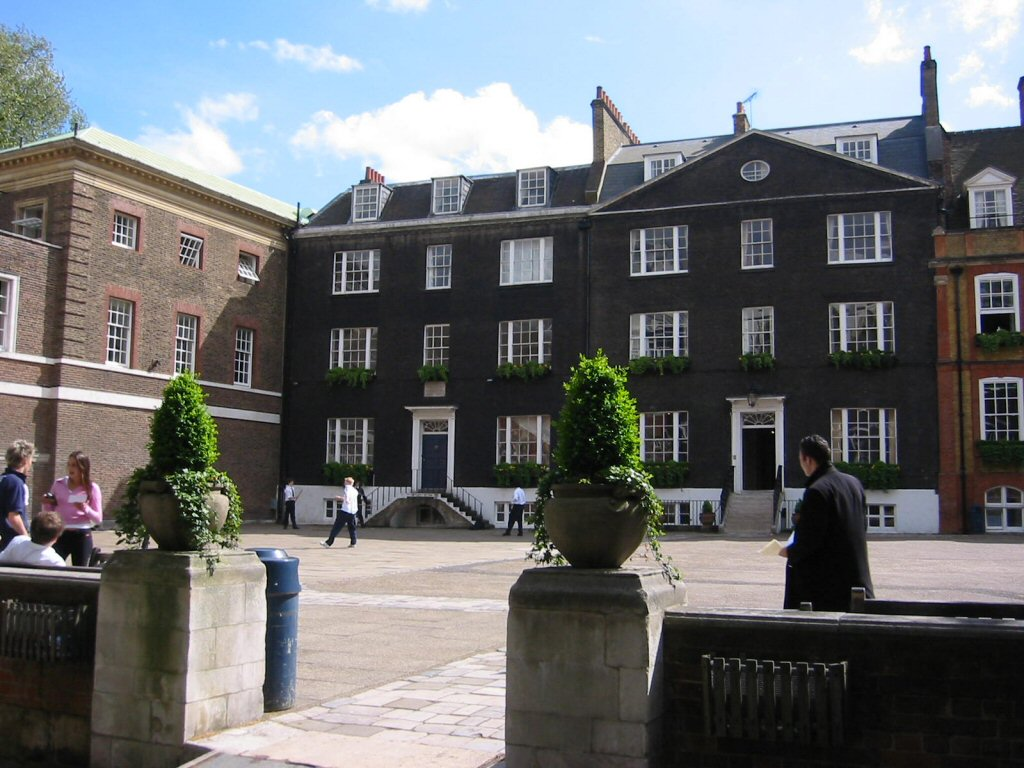
Rigaud's House (far right), Grant's House (right), residence of the Master of the King's Scholars (centre), College (far left, top floors) and the Houses of Wren's and Dryden's (far left, ground floor)

The school is split into 11 houses, some of which are day houses (only admitting day pupils, who go home after school), the others being boarding houses with a mix of boarders and day pupils. College is the exception to this — all King's Scholars must board. Each house has a Housemaster, a teacher who is responsible for the house, the pupils in it and their welfare, and a Head of House, a pupil in the Remove, nominated by the Housemaster. The role of the Head of House largely consists of assisting the Housemaster in organising activities such as house competitions, for which the Head of House might draw up teams. Further to these positions, each day house has an Assistant Housemaster, and each boarding house has a Resident Tutor. The houses are named after people connected to the house or school in various ways – mainly prominent Old Westminsters, but also former Head Masters and Housemasters. Grant's is the oldest house for pupils other than scholars, not only of Westminster but of any public school.

Houses are a focus for pastoral care and social and sporting activities, as well as accommodation for boarders. All houses are mixed-sex, and of the six boarding houses only Purcell's does not admit boarders of both genders, admitting only girls as boarders.

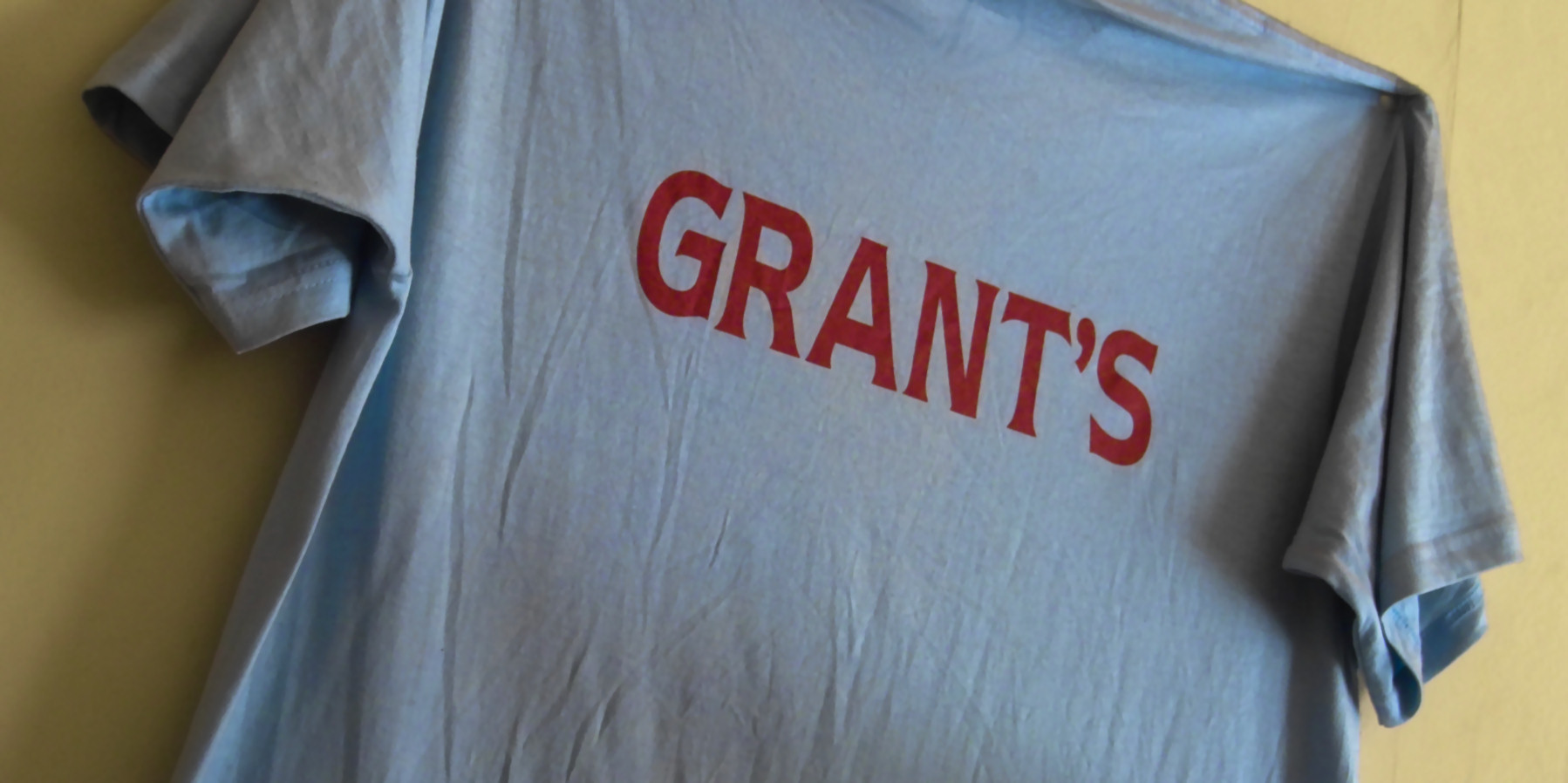
At inter-house sporting events, pupils wear house T-shirts, which are in house colours and feature the name of the house (except the College T-shirt which has no text).

House	Abbr.	Founded	Named after	Colours		Pupils	
House	Abbr.	Founded	Named after	Colours		Boarding	Day
College	CC	1560	n/a		Dark green	Mixed	None
Grant's	GG	1750	The "mothers" Grant – landladies who owned the property and put up boys in the days before boarding existed, when the School only accommodated Scholars; the oldest house in any of the Public Schools.	■	Maroon on light blue	Mixed	Mixed
Rigaud's	RR	pre-1896 (rebuilt)	Stephen Jordan Rigaud – former schoolmaster	■	Black on orange (tie uses orange on black)	Mixed	Mixed
Busby's	BB	1925	Richard Busby – former headmaster	■	Dark blue on maroon	Mixed	Mixed
Liddell's	LL	1956	Henry Liddell – former headmaster	■	Blue on yellow (ties are yellow on black or yellow and silver on black)	Mixed	Mixed
Purcell's (Note: Formerly Barton Street, and originally a part of Dryden's)	PP	1981	Henry Purcell – former organist of Westminster Abbey	■	White on purple	Girls	Boys
Ashburnham	AHH	1881	The Earls of Ashburnham whose London house is now part of the School	■	Light blue on dark blue	None	Mixed
Wren's	WW	1948	Christopher Wren	■	Pink on black (blue and maroon used on ties)	None	Mixed
Dryden's	DD	1976	John Dryden	■	Silver on red (tie uses separated silver and red stripes on dark blue)	None	Mixed
Hakluyt's	HH	1987	Richard Hakluyt	■	Yellow on blue	None	Mixed
Milne's	MM	1997	A. A. Milne	■	Black on orange (tie uses red and yellow)	None	Mixed

All King's Scholars, both boys and girls, are required to board in College (unless under exceptional circumstances). Wren's was formerly known as Homeboarders and Dryden's as Dale's. Before it was rebuilt, Rigaud's was known as Clapham's and Best's.

== Staff ==
=== Head masters ===
- 2020–present: Gary Savage
- 2014–2020: Patrick Derham
- 2005–2014: Stephen Spurr
- 1998–2005: Tristram Jones-Parry
- 1986–1998: David Summerscale
- 1970–1986: John Malcolm Rae
- 1957–1970: John Dudley Carleton
- 1950–1957: Walter Hamilton
- 1937–1950: John Traill Christie
- 1919–1936: Harold Costley-White
- 1901–1919: James Gow
- 1883–1901: William Gunion Rutherford
- 1855–1883: Charles Broderick Scott
- 1846–1855: Henry George Liddell
- 1828–1846: Richard Williamson
- 1819–1828: Edmund Goodenough
- 1815–1819: William Page
- 1803–1814: William Carey
- 1802: John Wingfield
- 1788–1802: William Vincent
- 1764–1788: Samuel Smith
- 1764: John Hinchliffe
- 1753–1764: William Markham
- 1733–1753: John Nicoll
- 1711–1733: Robert Freind
- 1695–1711: Thomas Knipe
- 1639–1695: Richard Busby
- 1621–1639: Lambert Osbaldeston (jointly with Wilson until 1626)
- 1610–1626: John Wilson
- 1598–1610: Richard Ireland
- 1593–1597: William Camden
- 1572–1592: Edward Grant
- 1570–1572: Francis Howlyn
- 1564–1570: Thomas Browne
- 1563: John Randall
- 1562: Robert Rolle
- 1557: John Passey
- 1555–1556: Nicholas Udall
- 1543–1555: Alexander Nowell
- 1540: John Adams

=== Other notable staff ===
- Nick Bevan (rowing coach, later headmaster of Shiplake College)
- John Sargeaunt (English Master)
- David Riches (rowing coach, history teacher)
- Keerthi Ranasinghe (cricket coach)
- Annie Hemingway (drama teacher)

== Controversies ==
=== Fee fixing ===
Between 2001 and 2004, the school was one of fifty independent schools involved in the independent school fee fixing scandal in the United Kingdom. It was subsequently found guilty of operating a fee-fixing cartel by the Office of Fair Trading. The commission argued that until 2000, the practice had been legal and that the commission had not been aware of the change in the law.

=== Rape culture and racism ===
Two independent reviews were commissioned after national campaigns from Everyone's Invited and Black Lives Matter unearthed evidence of rape culture and racism at Westminster School. In March 2022, the school issued a "sincere and unreserved" apology for harm caused by racism, sexual harassment and other harmful sexual behaviour.

==== Review into harmful sexual behaviours ====
In March 2021, alumni compiled a "dossier of rape culture" at the school. A 21-page document included 76 entries on "everyday life" for female pupils and included claims of rape, sexual assault, and sexual harassment. Allegations were levelled at both students and teachers.

In March 2022, a review into harmful sexual behaviour at the school was headed by Fiona Scolding QC. The review considered 44 Westminster-related posts submitted to Everyone's Invited alongside other evidence. The review found that 25% of pupils and 65% of girls surveyed said they experienced physical or verbal harmful sexual behaviours, sexual discrimination, and unwanted sharing of images. There was also "a strong sense from pupil interviewees of a social hierarchy within the school where some male pupils' status was dictated by familial wealth, academic success and charisma." Submissions to Everyone's Invited also recalled the Westminster Tree website that mapped sexual contact between students.

A total of 44 recommendations included an overhaul of the school's relationships and sex education curriculum, "active bystander" training, and a greater emphasis on building healthy relationships. The report also recommended training for housemasters, matrons, and tutors on managing pastoral issues including mental health. Other recommendations include a behavioural code of conduct for students informed by the student body.

==== Racism and race review ====
In 2020, more than 250 alumni signed a letter lobbying the school to combat the "toxic culture of racism within the student body." Signatories complained that Westminster did not include any black authors in their curriculum and overlooked Britain's role in the slave trade.

In March 2022, Challenge Consultancy published a Race Review of Westminster School that found "continued denial of the racism and the invisibility of the issue". Challenge Consultancy was commissioned by Westminster School to facilitate understanding of how staff and pupils perceive the culture around race, ethnicity and cultural diversity and consider how it can better engage with these issues in the future. The review's authors were led by Femi Otitoju who found evidence that international pupils including British Asian, British Black, Chinese and Jewish pupils "recounted a lack of sensitivity and delays in responding to emotions they experienced when calling out unacceptable behaviour". 25 recommendations included the recruitment of "diverse teaching staff," a publicised racial harassment policy, and an increased offer of counselling for victims.

== Notable alumni ==
About 900 people educated at Westminster School are in the Oxford Dictionary of National Biography. Former pupils are known at the school as "Old Westminsters" and include the following:

- Richard Hakluyt (1553–1616), writer
- Thomas Braddock (1556–1607), clergyman and translator
- Ben Jonson (1573–1637), poet and dramatist
- Arthur Dee (1579–1651), alchemist and royal physician
- George Herbert (1593–1633), public orator and poet
- John Dryden (1631–1700), poet and playwright
- John Locke (1632–1704), philosopher
- Sir Christopher Wren (1632–1723), architect and scientist, co-founder of the Royal Society
- Robert Hooke (1635–1703), scientist
- Henry Purcell (1659–1695), composer
- Joseph Thurston (1704–1732), poet admired by Alexander Pope
- Charles Wesley (1707–1788), Methodist preacher and writer of over 6,000 hymns
- Sir Charles Asgill, 1st Baronet (1714–1788), banker and Lord Mayor of London (1757–1758)
- Augustus Keppel, 1st Viscount Keppel (1725–1786), First Lord of the Admiralty
- Augustus Henry Fitzroy, 3rd Duke of Grafton (1735–1811), Prime Minister
- Edward Gibbon (1737–1794), historian
- Charles O'Hara (1740 – 25 February 1802), British military officer in the Seven Years' War, American War of Independence, and French Revolutionary War, later Governor of Gibraltar
- Charles Cotesworth Pinckney (1746–1825), ADC to Washington 1777, defeated by Jefferson in 1804 in contest for Presidency
- Jeremy Bentham (1748–1832), lawyer, eccentric and philosopher
- Thomas Pinckney (1750–1828), American soldier, politician, and diplomat
- Sir Charles Asgill, 2nd Baronet (1762–1823), British soldier and principal in the Asgill Affair
- Robert Southey (1774–1843), poet, historian and biographer
- Matthew Lewis (1775–1818), novelist and dramatist
- FitzRoy Somerset, 1st Baron Raglan (1788–1855), lost his right arm at Waterloo, C-in-C in the Crimea who is honoured with a statue in Dean's Yard
- Rev George Augustus Middleton (c. 1791–1848), colonial chaplain of New South Wales, Australia, and the first north of the Hawkesbury River
- John Russell, 1st Earl Russell (1792–1878), Prime Minister
- Augustus Short (11 June 1802 – 5 October 1883), the first Anglican bishop of Adelaide, South Australia
- Harry Robert Kempe (1852–1935), electrical engineer, author and editor.
- Athelstan Jasper Blaxland (1880−1963), English surgeon
- A. A. Milne (1882–1956, QS), author and journalist
- Oliver Lyttelton, 1st Viscount Chandos (1893–1972), Cabinet Minister during World War II, chairman of the National Theatre Board
- Hossein Ala' (1882–1964), Prime Minister of Iran
- Sir Adrian Boult (1889–1983), conductor
- Edgar Adrian, 1st Baron Adrian (1889–1977) Nobel prize winner
- Charles William Anderson Scott (1903–1946), pioneer aviator
- Sir John Gielgud (1904–2000, GG), actor and director
- Charles Harvard Gibbs-Smith (1909–1981), historian
- Kim Philby (1912–1988), high-ranking member of British intelligence, one of the Cambridge Five and NKVD/KGB double agent
- Sir Norman Parkinson (1913–1990), portrait and fashion photographer
- Richard Stone (1913–1991), winner of the Nobel Prize in Economics
- Roger Kidner (1914–2007), publisher and railway photographer
- Sir Andrew Huxley (1917–2012), Nobel prizewinning physiologist
- Sir Peter Ustinov (1921–2004), actor, writer, director and raconteur
- John Cole (1923–1995), fashion photographer
- Tony Benn (1925–2014), politician
- Peter Brook (1925–2022, LL 1937–1938), theatre director
- Nigel Lawson (1932–2023, WW 1945–1950), former Chancellor of the Exchequer, father of Nigella Lawson
- Simon Gray (1936–2008, WW 1949–1954), playwright and diarist
- Jonathan Fenby (born 1942, LL 1956–1960), journalist, author and former Editor of The Observer and South China Morning Post
- Sir Martyn Poliakoff (born 1947) Professor of Chemistry and narrator of The Periodic Table of Videos
- Andrew Lloyd Webber (born 1948, QS 1960–1965), composer and producer
- Henry Marsh (born 1950), neurosurgeon and writer
- Stephen Poliakoff (born 1952, WW 1966–1970), director, playwright and television dramatist
- Chris Huhne (born 1954), disgraced Liberal Democrat politician
- Dominic Grieve (born 1956), former attorney-general and pro-European politician
- Jon Crowcroft (born 1957), Professor at the University of Cambridge
- Shane MacGowan (1957-2023, AHH 1972–1973), musician
- Adam Boulton (born 1959), journalist, broadcaster and author
- Barney Hoskyns (born 5 May 1959), music critic and editorial director of the online music journalism archive Rock's Backpages
- Andrew Graham-Dixon (born 1960), art critic and writer
- Edward St Aubyn (born 1960), author and journalist
- Timothy Winter (born 1960), Shaykh Zayed Lecturer in Islamic Studies, Faculty of Divinity, Cambridge University
- David Heyman (born 1961), film producer
- Alexander Beard (born 1963), arts administrator
- Matt Frei (born 1963, RR 1978–1981), broadcaster
- Ian Bostridge (born 1964), classical tenor
- Gavin Rossdale (born 1965), musician, songwriter, and lead singer with rock band Bush
- Michael Sherwood (born 1965), banker
- Lucasta Miller (born 1966), writer and critic
- Helena Bonham Carter (born 1966, LL 1982–1984), actress
- Jason Kouchak (born 1967), pianist and composer
- Noreena Hertz (born 1967, CC 1983–85), economist and campaigner
- Nick Clegg (born 1967, LL), Liberal Democrat leader, MP for Sheffield Hallam, former Deputy Prime Minister
- James Robbins (1968–1972, GG), broadcaster
- Ruth Kelly (born 1968, DD 1984–86), cabinet minister
- Afshin Rattansi (RR 1981–83), journalist
- Marcel Theroux (born 1968), novelist and broadcaster
- Joe Cornish (born 1968), broadcaster, director and screenwriter
- Adam Buxton (born 1969), comedian
- Giles Coren (born 1969, RR 1982–1988), journalist
- Lucy Walker (born 1970), documentary film-maker
- Louis Theroux (born 1970), broadcaster
- Jonathan Yeo (born 1970), artist
- Dido Armstrong (born 1971, WW, 1987–1989), British musician under the name "Dido"
- Polly Arnold (born 1972) Director of the Chemical Sciences Division at the Lawrence Berkeley National Laboratory
- Martha Lane Fox (born 1973), head of Digital Public Services
- James Reynolds (born 1974), BBC News presenter
- Conrad Shawcross (born 1977), artist
- Blaise Metreweli (born 1977), chief of MI6
- Pinny Grylls (born 1978, HH 1994–1996), documentary film-maker
- Benjamin Yeoh (born 1978), playwright
- Christian Coulson (born 1978), Harry Potter actor
- Simon Ambrose (born 1979), Chairman of the London Contemporary Orchestra
- Alexander Shelley (born 1979), conductor
- Louis Mosley (born 1983), businessman and politician
- Anna Stothard (born 1983), novelist
- Michael Penniman (born 1983), musician under the name "Mika"
- Jack Farthing (born 1985), actor
- Grace Chatto (born 1985), cellist in the band Clean Bandit
- Alfred Enoch (born 1988), Harry Potter actor
- Neil Amin-Smith (born 1989), political advisor and musician
- Jack Aitken (born 1995), racing driver
- Blondey McCoy (born 1997), artist and model

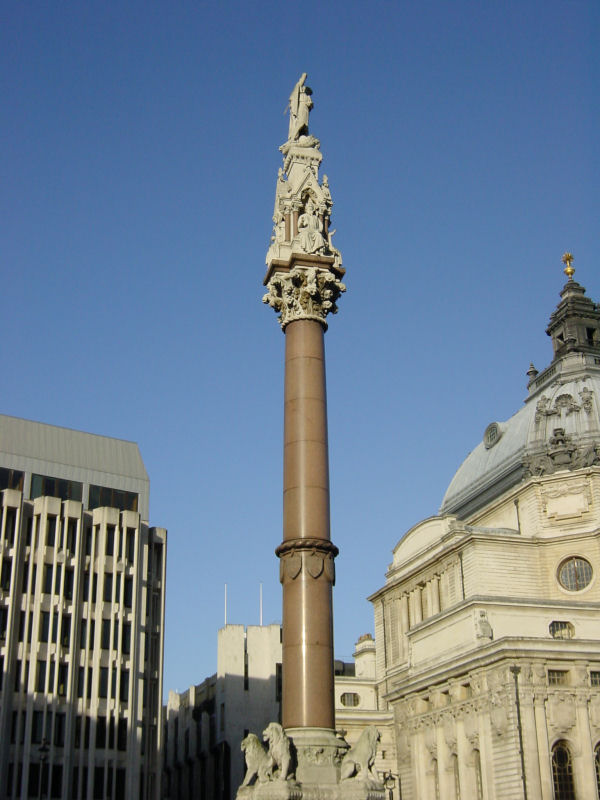
A monument to commemorate former pupils who died in the Crimean War, situated in the Sanctuary, next to the Great West Door of Westminster Abbey

=== Victoria Cross holders ===
Six pupils of Westminster have been awarded the Victoria Cross:

- Edmund Henry Lenon (1830–1893, at Westminster June 1851 – 1855)
- William George Hawtry Bankes (1836–1858) (at Westminster April 1850 – 1856)
- Sir Nevill Maskelyne Smyth (1868–1941, at Westminster June 1882 – 1885). He served in the First World War
- Arthur Martin-Leake (1874–1953; at Westminster June 1888 – 1891), one of only three to receive twice
- William Hew Clark-Kennedy (1879–1961, at Westminster June 1893 – 1896)
- Richard Wakeford (1921–1972, at Westminster June 1934 – 1940)

== See also ==
- List of the oldest schools in the United Kingdom
- List of the oldest schools in the world
- Old Westminsters F.C.
- Schools' Head of the River Race
- The Old Boys' Network
