= College (Westminster School) =

Boarding house for the King's Scholars at Westminster School, London

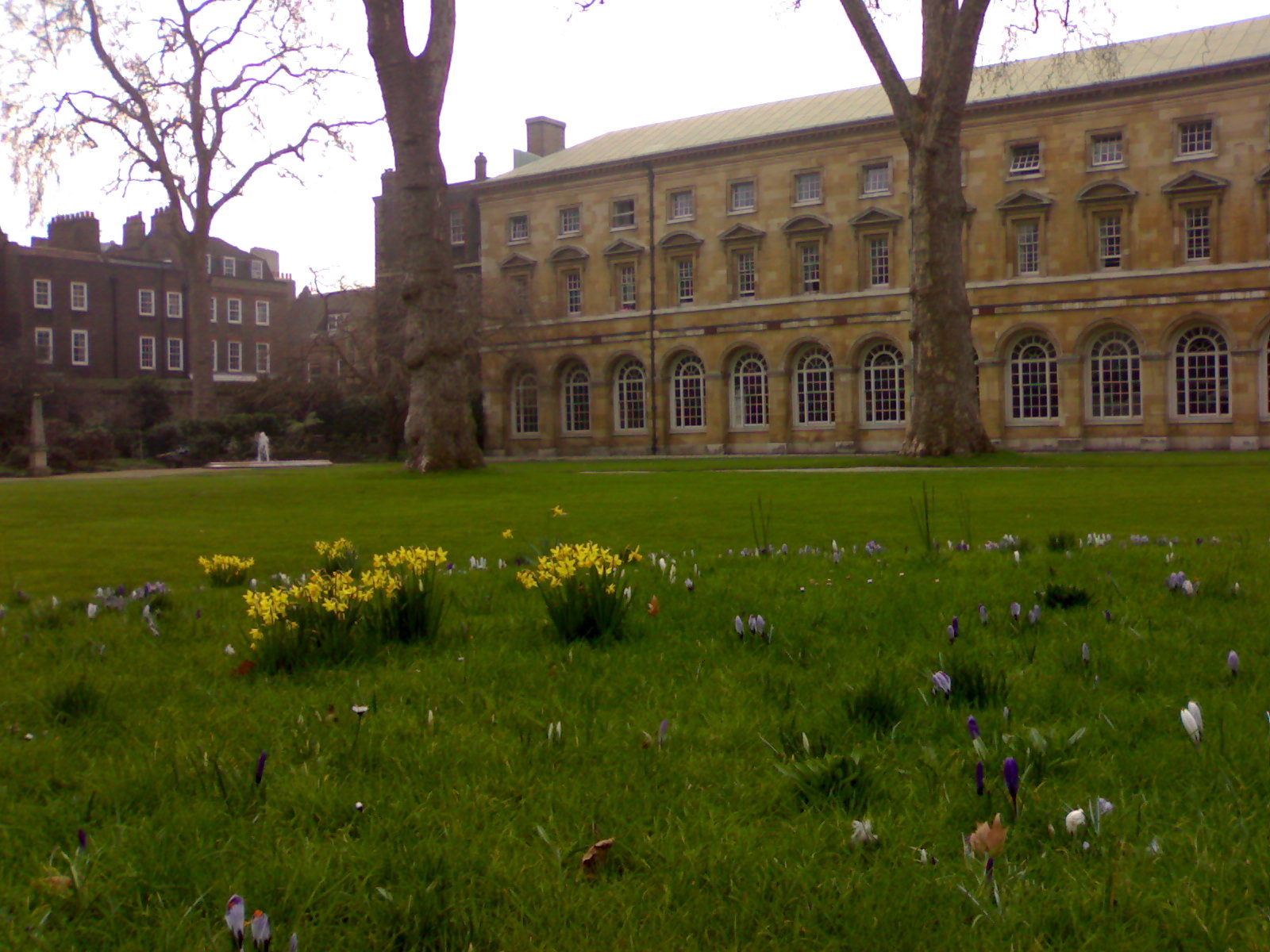
- Interactive map of the College area
- Alternative names: College Dormitory, Lord Burlington's Dormitory

General information
- Type: Boarding house
- Location: Westminster School, London, England
- Coordinates: 51.4972°N 0.1276°W
- Completed: c1772
- Owner: Westminster School

Website
- Westminster School

College, also known as College Dormitory, and (historically) Lord Burlington's Dormitory is the historic boarding house for the King's Scholars of Westminster School in London, England. It is one of the oldest continuously inhabited buildings in the school and remains the residence of the forty King's Scholars, whose education dates from the original royal foundation of Queen Elizabeth I. It was designed by Richard Boyle, 3rd Earl of Burlington, based in part on earlier designs by Christopher Wren; the present building dates from 1772.

== History ==
The present College building dates from 1772, when architect Richard Boyle, 3rd Earl of Burlington laid the foundation stone for a new building designed in the Palladian style, drawing inspiration from Palladio's cloister at San Giorgio Maggiore in Venice, and also from Inigo Jones' piazzas in Covent Garden. It was Burlington's first public building, and the first building in London to use Bath stone.

In August 1939 Westminster School was evacuated to Sussex, where it remained for the duration of WW2. In May 1941 College was bombed in an air raid; the interior was almost completely destroyed, leaving only the stone walls standing. Westminster School Hall was burned out in the same raid. College was rebuilt after the war and re-opened by King George V in 1950.

== King's Scholars ==
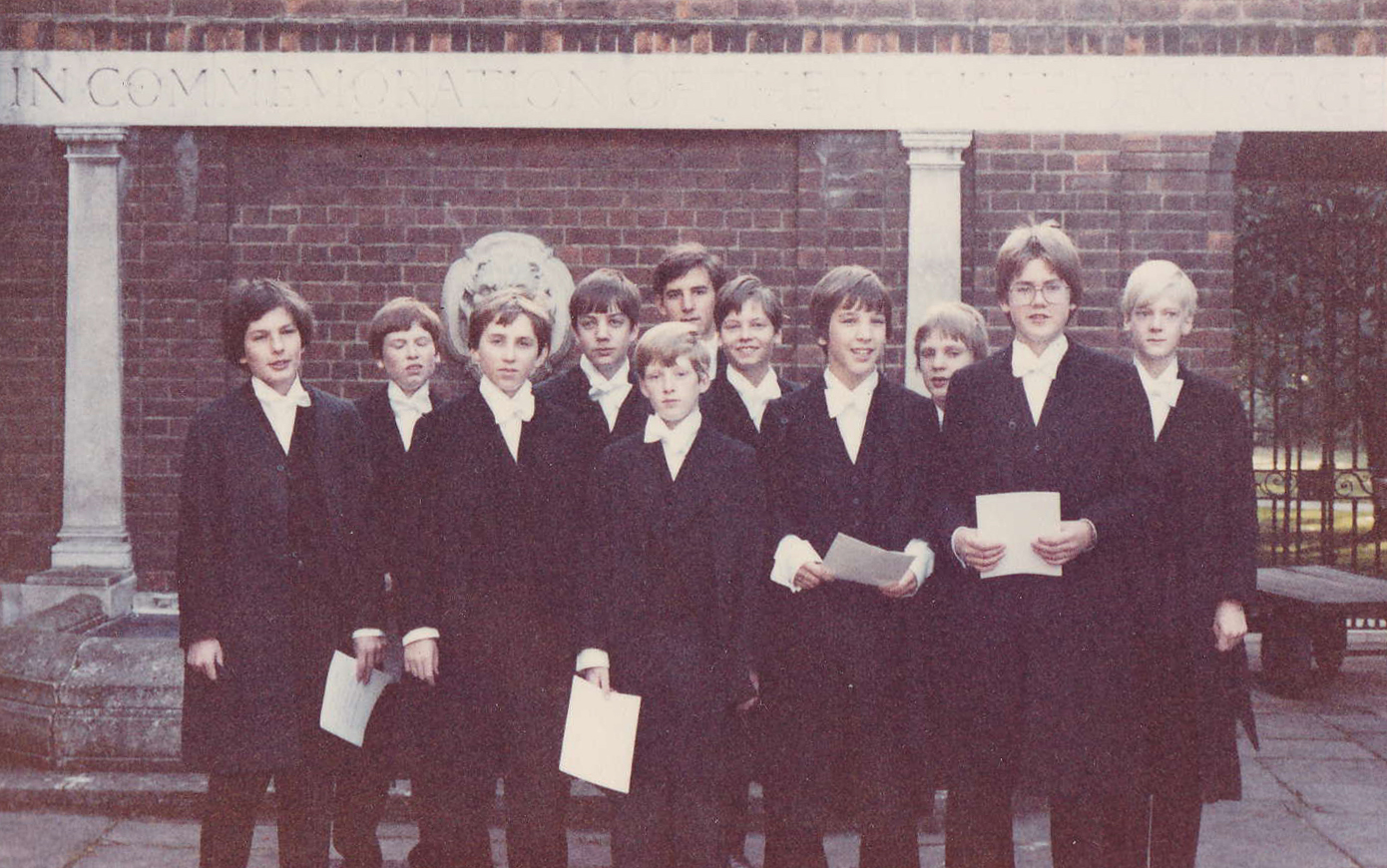
Queen's Scholars, Westminster School, 1981

College houses The King's Scholars of Westminster School, whose education dates back to the original royal foundation of Queen Elizabeth I in 1560. The scholars take part in each coronation in Westminster Abbey, acclaiming the new monarch by shouting "Vivat". They also have the right to observe Parliament. Prior to 2017, 40 scholarships were available, all were awarded to boys sitting the Westminster "Challenge". Four Sixth Form girls' scholarships were launched in 2017.

During the reign of a queen, the King's Scholars become Queen's Scholars.

== Today ==
Today College retains much of its eighteenth-century character. The building forms the east flank of the school courtyard known as Little Dean's Yard, with a central hall and dormitory rooms above. To the east is College Garden, one of the oldest gardens in England.

== See also ==
- College Garden
- King's Scholar (Westminster School)
- Westminster School
- Westminster Abbey

== Bibliography ==
- The King's Nurseries by John Field, James & James, London, 1987
