= College Hall (Westminster School) =

Coordinates: 51°29′57″N 0°07′43″W

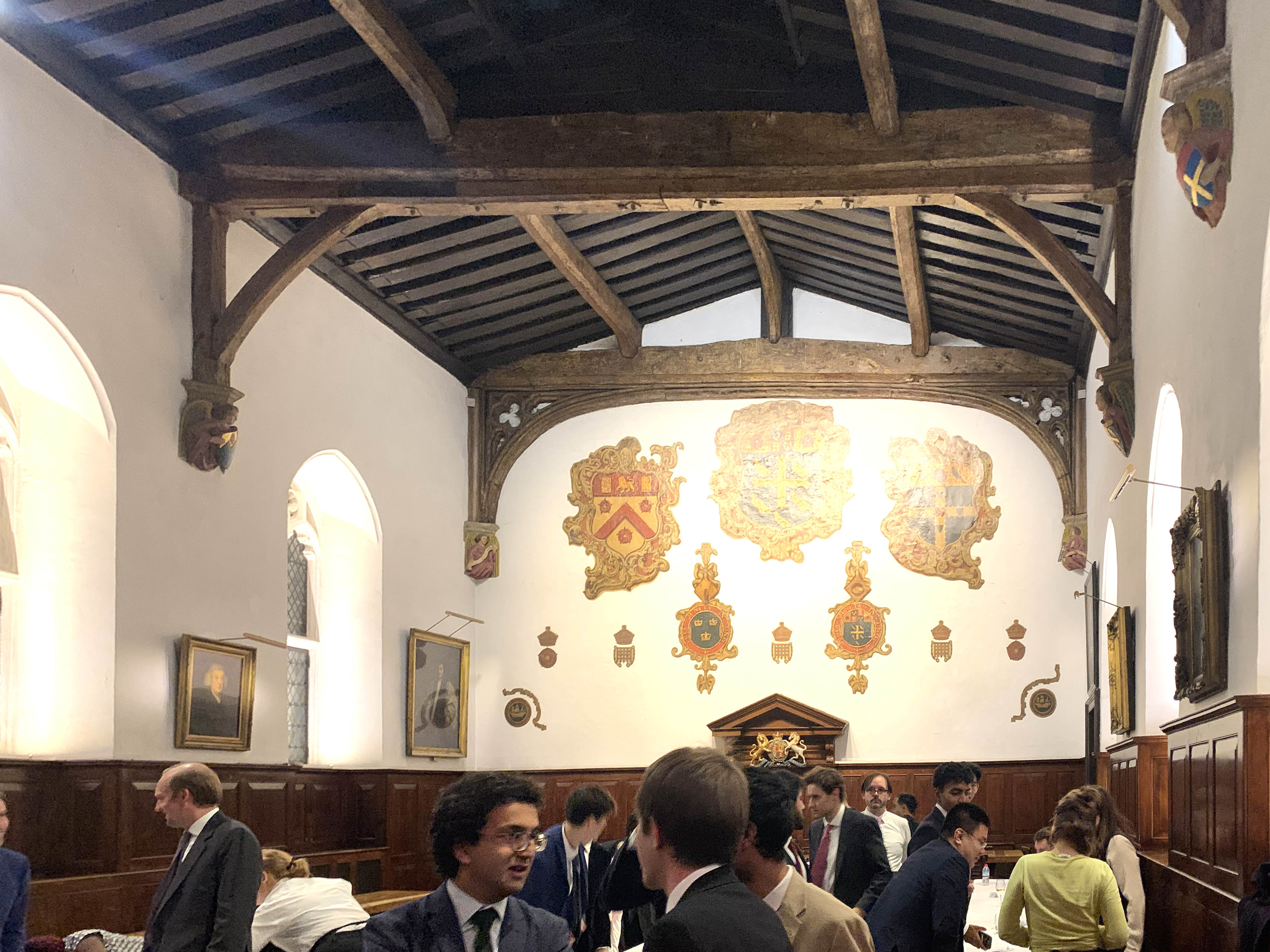
- Interior of College Hall, Westminster School

General information
- Architectural style: Medieval
- Location: Little Dean’s Yard, Westminster School, City of Westminster, London, England
- Governing body: Westminster School / Westminster Abbey

Technical details
- Material: Stone, wood (timber roof)

Design and construction
- Architect: Abbot Litlyngton (as part of the Abbot’s House)

College Hall is the 14th-century dining hall of the Abbots of Westminster, and may be the oldest continuously used dining hall in London. Queen Elizabeth Woodville took sanctuary in College Hall in 1483, and in the 1560s Elizabeth I came to College Hall to see her scholars act their Latin plays on stage. College Hall survived bomb damage during The Blitz, and today serves as the main dining hall of Westminster School.

== History ==
=== Medieval origins ===
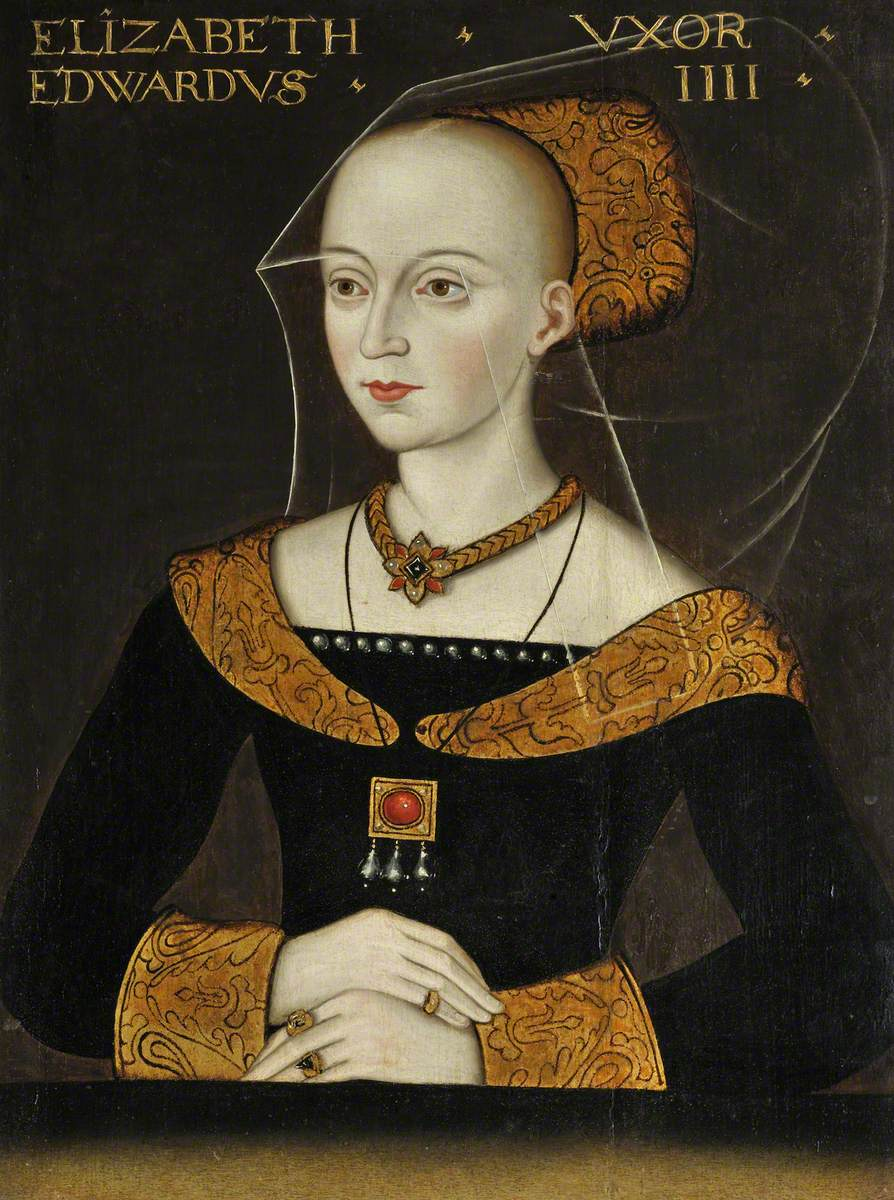
Elizabeth Woodville sought sanctuary in College Hall in 1483

The hall was built under Abbot Litlyngton, completed in 1376 or 1377, when the windows were glazed. It was originally built as the west side of a semi-fortified house built around a small courtyard adjacent to Westminster Abbey. Shields held by angels forming corbels still bear the Abbot's arms to this day. The roof was likely constructed by the carpenter Hugh Herland, who also built the roof of Westminster Hall for King Richard II.

Heating was originally provided by a central hearth, a practice that remained until 1847. Most of the roof structure, including the central louvre (or lantern) to vent smoke, is original. Before 1847, College juniors were made to leap over the fire. One, Charles Longley, later Archbishop of Canterbury, bore the scars until the end of his life.

Queen Elizabeth Woodville took sanctuary in College Hall in 1483 with five daughters and her son Richard of Shrewsbury, Duke of York, whose fate was to be one of the unfortunate Princes in the Tower. She and her children "sat alow on the rushes all desolate and dismaied".

=== Queen Elizabeth I ===
In the 1560s, Elizabeth I, who re-founded Westminster School, came to see her scholars act their Latin plays on a stage on a number of occasions. The Elizabethan gallery may have been erected especially for this purpose. Legend has it that the gallery was built from Armada timber, but evidence for this is scanty.

During the Reformation, the hall came to be used both by the Dean and Chapter of Westminster Abbey and the King’s Scholars of Westminster School.

Over time, the Abbey clergy ceased dining there regularly, and College Hall became used solely by Westminster School for its dining purposes. However, the Dean and Chapter still use it on special occasions, such as the Collegiate Dinner.

=== Modern era ===
The hall survived bomb damage during the Second World War. It underwent restoration in 1972. College Hall remains the main dining hall for Westminster School. It is used for lunches, teas and formal dinners for pupils and staff. On special occasions (e.g. the Collegiate Dinner), the Dean and Chapter of Westminster Abbey also make use of the hall. The Latin form of grace laid down in 1560 remains in use before lunch in College Hall: Oculi omnium in te sperant, Domine: et tu das escam illorum in tempore opportuno. Aperis tu manum tuam, et imples omne animal benedictione tua. Per Jesum Christum, Dominum nostrum, Amen

== Architecture and features ==
The roof is mainly medieval; the centre louvre (lantern) remains to allow smoke venting. The hall was originally hung with tapestries; wood panelling (wainscot) was added in 1733. Above the high table are painted coats of arms of Westminster Abbey and two colleges closely associated with the School: Christ Church, Oxford and Trinity College, Cambridge. A south end gallery, possibly for musicians, dates from the mid-17th century.

== Significance ==
College Hall is notable as one of the oldest intact medieval refectories in continuous use in London.

== See also ==
- College (Westminster School)
- King's Scholar (Westminster School)

== Bibliography ==
- The King's Nurseries by John Field, James & James, London, 1987
