= College Garden =

Garden at Westminster Abbey in London

Coordinates: 51°29′53″N 0°07′37″W

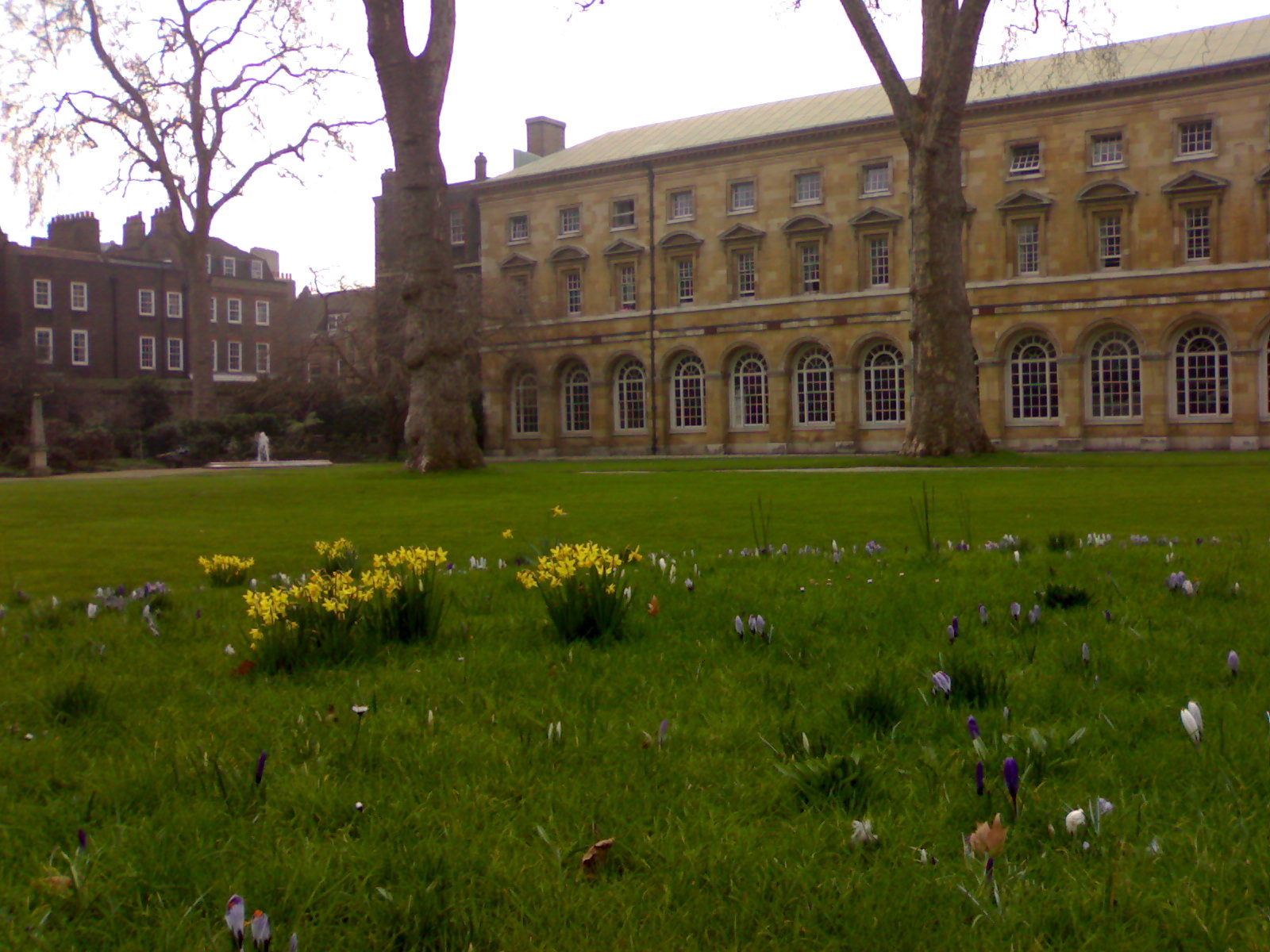
College Garden

College Garden is a private garden of Westminster Abbey in London, open to the public Monday through Friday from 10:00am to 4:00pm throughout the year. The garden can be visited separately from the abbey and no charge is made to visit the garden alone. While visiting College Garden, it is also possible to visit the Little Cloister Garden, a small garden with a fountain in the cloisters, and St Catherine's Garden which is in the ruins of the old monastic infirmary.

A thousand years ago, College Garden was the infirmary garden of the monastery, then on Thorney Island, and it is claimed to be the oldest garden in England under continuous cultivation. While the main function of the College Garden is no longer to feed hungry monks, the area still retains an atmosphere of calm, despite being situated in such a busy area. Remembering the Herbarium that the monks created here, a new herb garden was created in 2010.

Its current name refers to the Collegiate Church of St. Peter, Westminster Abbey, rather than to its component Westminster School of which Lord Burlington's College Dormitory building forms the west side. The north side is formed by the great hall of Westminster School (originally the monks' dormitory), and the houses of the abbey canons; the east and south sides are a medieval wall with a watergate which formerly opened into the River Thames, now embanked 50 metres away beyond the House of Lords. Just outside the watergate, College Green is often seen in television interviews with politicians.

== See also ==
- Westminster School
- College Hall
