= Thorney Island (Westminster) =

Former small island in London, England

Coordinates: 51°29′54″N 0°7′44″W

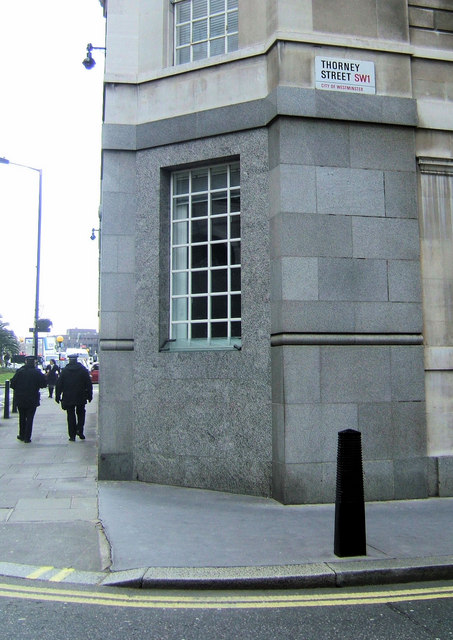
Thorney Street Westminster

Thorney Island was the eyot (or small island) on the River Thames in Westminster, in Anglo-Saxon London, where Westminster Abbey and the Palace of Westminster (commonly known today as the Houses of Parliament) were built. It was formed by rivulets of the River Tyburn, which entered the Thames nearby. In Roman times, and presumably earlier, Thorney Island may have been part of a natural ford where Watling Street crossed the Thames, of particular importance before the construction of London Bridge.

The name may be derived from the Anglo-Saxon Þorn-īeg, meaning "Thorn Island".

Thorney is described in a purported 8th century charter of King Offa of Mercia, which is kept in the Abbey muniments, as a "terrible place". In the Spring of 893, Edward the Elder, son of Alfred the Great, forced invading Vikings to take refuge on Thorney Island. Despite hardships and more Viking raids over the following centuries, the monks tamed the island until by the time of Edward the Confessor it was "A delightful place, surrounded by fertile land and green fields". The abbey's College Garden survives, a thousand years later, and may be the oldest garden in England.

Since the Middle Ages, the level of the land has risen, the rivulets have been built over, and the Thames has been embanked, so that there is now no visible Thorney Island. The name is kept only by Thorney Street, at the back of the MI5 Security Service building; but a local heritage organisation established by June Stubbs in 1976 took the name The Thorney Island Society.

In 1831, the boundaries of the former island were described as the Chelsea Waterworks, the Grosvenor Canal, and the ornamental water in St James's Park.

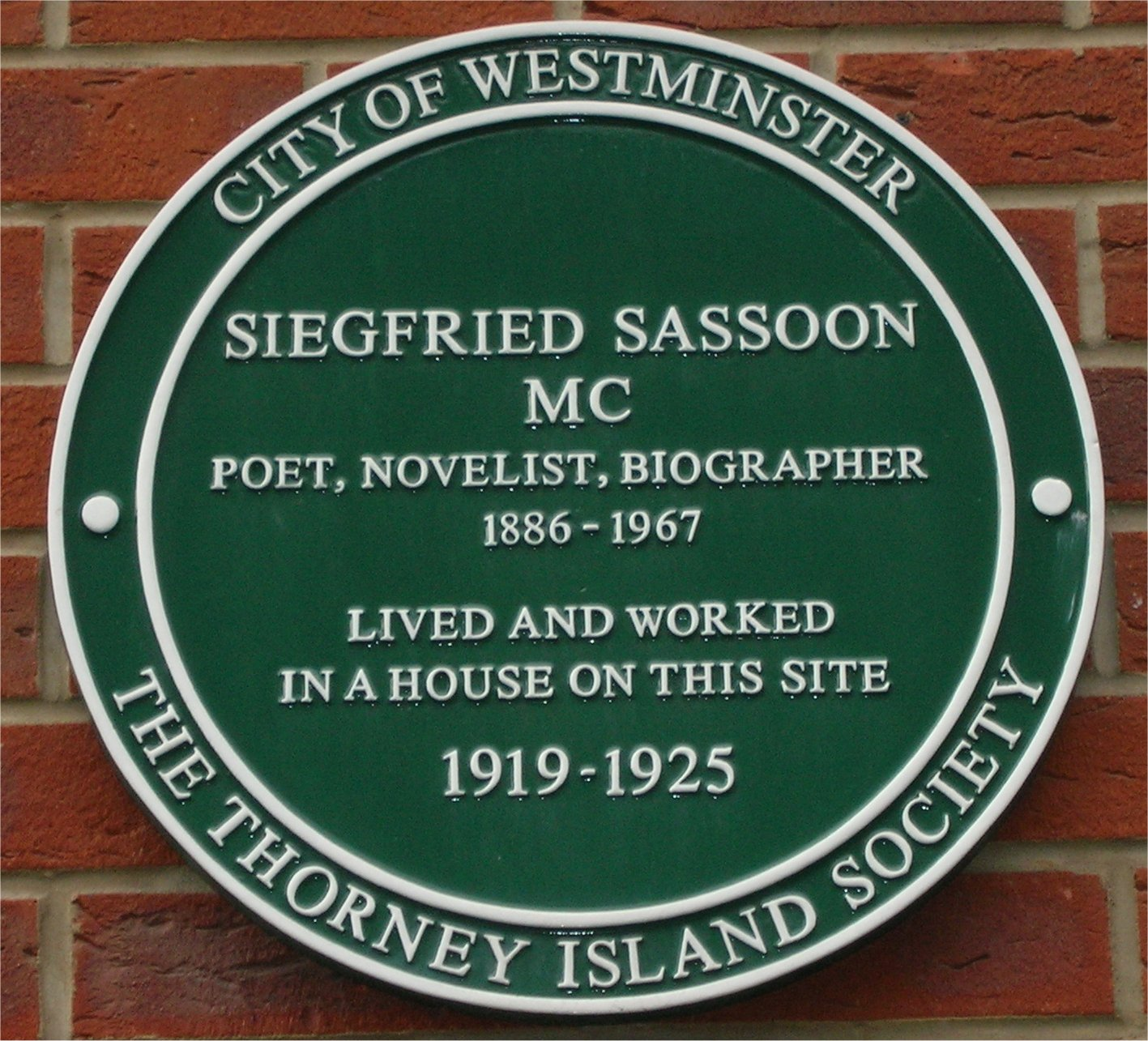
Plaque on Siegfried Sassoon's house in Tufton Street, Westminster

Thorney Island is one of the places reputed to be the site of King Canute's demonstration that he could not command the tides, because he built a palace at Westminster.

In 2000, the politician John Roper was created a Life peer and revived the name of Thorney in Parliament by taking the title Baron Roper of Thorney Island in the City of Westminster.
