= Everyone's Invited =

Anti-rape movement based in the United Kingdom

- Formation: June 2020
- Founders: Soma Sara
- Type: Nonprofit
- Website: https://www.everyonesinvited.uk/

Everyone's Invited is an anti-rape movement organisation based in the United Kingdom, focused on exposing rape culture through "conversation, education and support." It was founded in June 2020 by Soma Sara, and allows survivors of rape culture to share their stories through testimonies shared anonymously on their website and Instagram profile.

== History ==
In June 2020, after watching the BBC television series I May Destroy You (2020), Soma Sara began sharing her personal experiences of rape culture via social media platform Instagram. In response, she received messages from people who could relate to her experiences and those who shared their own experiences of misogyny, harassment, sexual abuse and sexual assault. Within a week, she had received and shared over 300 anonymous responses. She used this as grounds to launch Everyone's Invited.

I wanted to do everything in my power to continue this essential conversation by giving these stories a more permanent platform.

— Soma Sara, Last Bus Magazine

Sara says that sex education in schools is the "root of the problem", and that a more comprehensive programme is needed. She also believes that most of the behaviours are internalised and is against cancel culture, saying that she believes the movement can not be "weaponise[d]" with it and that it is "counter-productive".

The Instagram campaign encourages victims, mostly in schools, to share their experiences of rape culture, sexual harassment, slut-shaming, coercion into sex or sharing of nude photographs and more, anonymously, in what the organisation calls "testimony". In March 2021, following the death of Sarah Everard, these testimonies saw a rise in popularity, going "viral". As of 10 June 2021, 16,554 testimonies had been submitted. Though no individuals are mentioned in the testimonies, schools are, including some of the most prestigious schools in England; single-sex ones such as St Paul's School, Harrow School and Eton College, and mixed-sex ones too, including Latymer Upper School and Wellington College.

Towards the end of March 2021 and in April 2021, the movement shifted focus towards universities in the United Kingdom; between 26 March and 1 April, over 1,000 testimonies were submitted from students in universities. "Elite" institutions such as the University of Oxford, the University of Exeter and University College London were named. The organisation published a list of 17 universities that attracted the most allegations, and 15 of the universities named were a part of the Russell Group, a British association of universities.

In June 2021 Everyone's Invited released a list of all the schools or colleges in the UK and Ireland it had received testimonies from, almost 3,000. This included 2,556 are secondary schools and 406 are primary schools.

== Response ==
This is a widespread, endemic issue. It’s not about one environment, or demographic or school; [it] is so deeply ingrained in our culture, people really need to understand that if we're going to be able to dismantle it.

— Soma Sara, ITV News

=== Media coverage ===
Following the testimonies going "viral" in March 2021, the campaign received mainstream media coverage, with papers including The Times, The Daily Telegraph, BBC News, the Evening Standard publishing articles about the movement, and Sara also appeared on national television to talk about it. It is seen as the first time the popular Me Too movement focused on a "problematic culture" in schools.

=== School responses ===
Latymer Upper School made a statement condemning the actions described in the testimonies, calling them "deeply disturbing", before informing the police. A spokesperson for Eton College said that the school "always take any specific allegations – including about the sending or sharing of explicit images – extremely seriously", that they are investigated "thoroughly", and that "any disciplinary action required" is taken, while St Paul's School also said that they "always investigate fully matters of this nature". Barnaby Lenon, chairman of the Independent Schools Council, encouraged pupils to inform their schools, in person, about their experiences, saying that it is "difficult" dealing with anonymous statements, of which many "relate to incidents which took place outside school at social events."

=== Police response ===
In March 2021, the Metropolitan Police began contacting schools which they could identify from the Everyone's Invited testimonies; Scotland Yard launched a national investigation into the claims on 27 March 2021, with officials from the Home Office and Department for Education "leading a cross-Government response with senior officers". It was revealed that a helpline was to be set up by the police. The National Police Chiefs' Council said that the issue of rape culture in schools "presented a huge challenge to society". Scotland Yard's rape and sexual offences lead Detective Superintendent Mel Laremore told BBC Radio 4 that the issue is a "national" one, adding that she thinks "it is more widespread than private schools."

Chief Constable Simon Bailey, who is also the National Police Chiefs' Council lead on child protection, said that "this is the next scandal" within schools. He also said "I think schools are quite frankly struggling with the sheer scale of this", and that it's not right that girls are "having to run the gauntlet of sexual harassment, misogyny, the sending of nudes, unsolicited or indecent images being sent to them."

=== Government response ===
The chair of the Education Select Committee, Robert Halfon, called for an independent investigation, outside of the police force, to be set up afterwards, describing the situation as "appalling". He also said that the Office for Standards in Education (Ofsted) should be responsible for the safeguarding inspections of independent schools, rather than an inspection regime appointed by the school themselves, which is what the current system allows. A government spokesperson said: "We are very concerned by the significant number of allegations recently posted on the Everyone's Invited website. The abuse of children and young people in all its forms is abhorrent."

A helpline, run by the National Society for the Prevention of Cruelty to Children (NSPCC), was launched on 1 April 2021, which received 426 calls up to the 7 June 2021 and made 80 referrals to external agencies and an immediate review into abuse in schools by Ofsted was initiated.

In June 2021 Ofsted released its rapid report on sexual abuse in schools and colleges. It conducted interviews with over 900 children and young people and staff in 32 schools and colleges in England. It said that sexual harassment has become "normalised" among school-age children, with nine in 10 girls having experienced sexist name-calling or were sent explicit photos or videos. It also said that more than two-thirds of girls said they endured unwanted touching "a lot" or "sometimes", while eight in 10 said they had been put under pressure to share sexual images of themselves. The report said that students often do not see the point of reporting abuse and many teachers underestimate the scale of these problems.

Jeremy Miles, the Education Minister in Wales, said the issue "is a priority for us here in Wales too". He said that the Welsh Government is looking at what is the best way to respond to this, and this could include an inquiry by the Welsh inspectorate, Estyn.

=== Other reactions ===
Further results of Everyone's Invited's growing popularity in March 2021 included a letter being sent to King's College School, London, by a former Head Girl of Wimbledon High School, describing King's College School as a "hotbed of sexual violence", and walkouts at Highgate School in retaliation to a dossier published by The Times which included over 220 testimonies of sexual assault at the school. The Times also published an open letter from a former Dulwich College pupil, tagging the school as a "breeding ground for sexual predators".

== Recognition ==
In 2021, Soma Sara, the founder, was recognised as one of the BBC's 100 women.
