= King's Scholar (Westminster School) =

Kings's Scholar
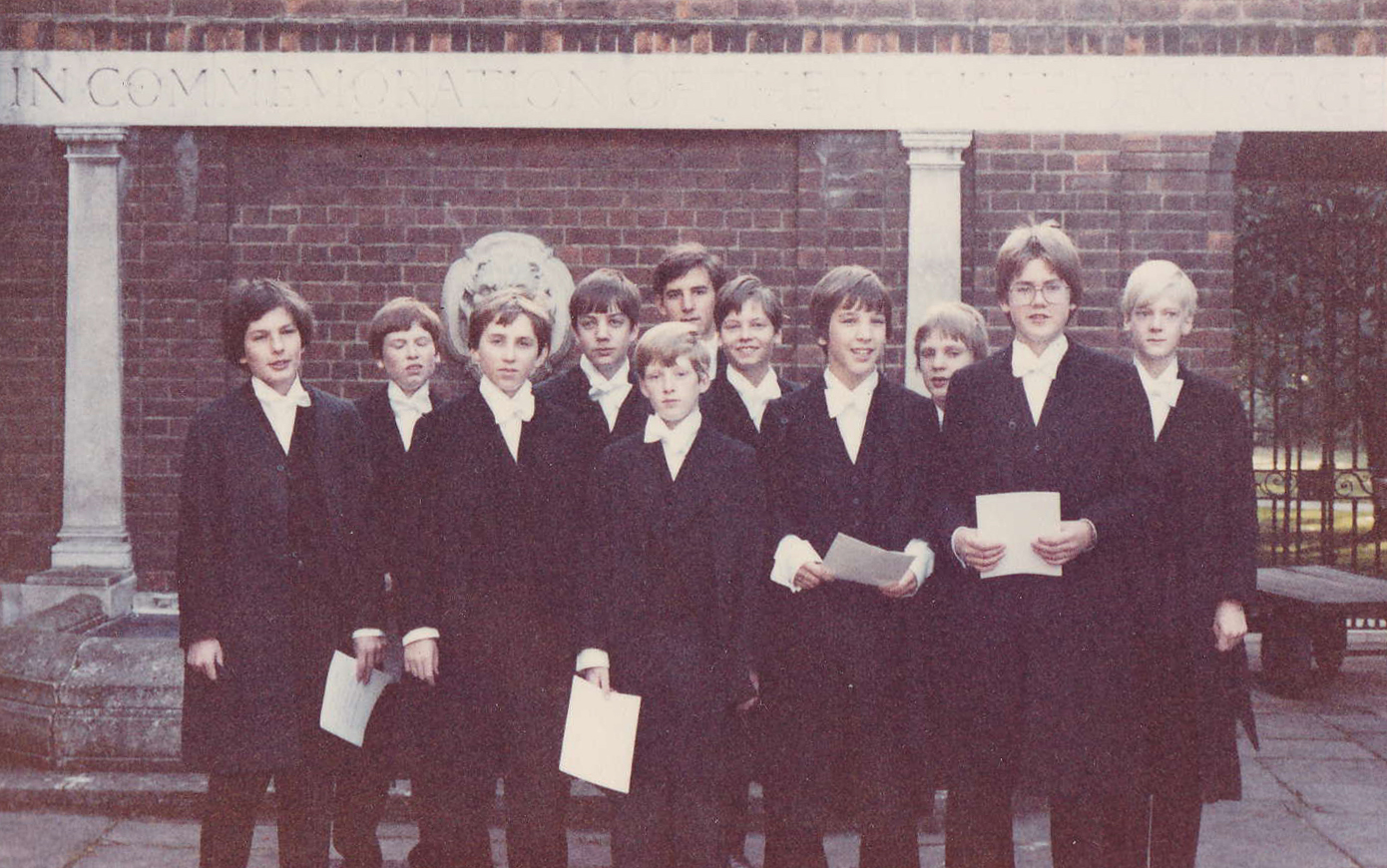
- Queen's Scholars, Westminster School, 1981
- Awarded for: study at Westminster School
- Sponsored by: Westminster School
- Location: Westminster, London
- Established: c1560 by Queen Elizabeth I
- Website: https://www.westminster.org.uk/admissions/scholarships-and-bursaries/the-challenge/

The Kings's Scholarships (or Queen's Scholarships) are currently forty-eight scholarships (eight per year until Sixth Form, then twelve per year) at Westminster School, (re)founded in 1560 by Queen Elizabeth I. The scholars take part in each coronation in Westminster Abbey, acclaiming the new monarch by shouting "Vivat". They also have the right to observe the House of Commons. Their house is "College", and they have the abbreviation KS (or QS) on school lists.

Twelve- and thirteen-year-old boys annually compete for eight of the annual scholarships in a competitive entrance examination known as the Challenge. Fifteen- and sixteen-year-old girls compete for the other four scholarships, which are awarded to the top four students in subject-specific Sixth Form entrance exams. For 400 years the best of the scholars were elected to closed scholarships at Christ Church, Oxford, and Trinity College, Cambridge; since the early 1970s, Westminster School boys and girls must win open Oxbridge scholarships by public examination.

Prior to 2017, only 40 scholarships were awarded to boys sitting the Challenge examination. The four Sixth Form girls' scholarships were added in 2017.

During the reign of a queen, the King's Scholars become Queen's Scholars, in contrast to the King's Scholarships at Eton College who retain that title in honour of their royal founder even when the current monarch is a queen.

== Notable King's or Queen's Scholars ==
- Richard Hakluyt (1553–1616), Elizabethan writer
- George Herbert (1593–1633), poet and priest
- William Cartwright (1611–1643), poet and dramatist
- Abraham Cowley (1618–1667), poet
- John Dryden (1631–1700), poet and playwright
- John Locke (1632–1704), philosopher
- Robert South (1634–1716), priest and Latin poet
- Robert Hooke (1635–1703), scientist and polymath
- Warren Hastings (1732–1818), Governor of Calcutta
- George Cotton (1813–1866), headmaster and Bishop
- A. A. Milne (1882–1956), children's author
- John Spedan Lewis (1885–1963), founder of the John Lewis Partnership
- Edgar Adrian, 1st Baron Adrian (1889–1977), Nobel Prize-winning scientist
- Sidney Frank Waterson (1896–1978), South African politician
- Kim Philby (1912–1988), Russian spy
- Jonathan Ashmore (born 1948), physicist
- Andrew Lloyd Webber (born 1948), composer
- David Neuberger (born 1948), President of the Supreme Court
- Dominic Grieve (born 1956), barrister and former MP
- Ian Bostridge (born 1964), tenor
- Alastair Sooke (born 1981), art critic

== See also ==
- College (Westminster School)
- College Hall (Westminster School)
- Westminster School
