= Bergne =

Bergne is a surname. Notable people with the surname include:

- John Brodribb Bergne (1800–1873), English numismatist and antiquary
- Paul Bergne (1937–2007), British diplomat and historian
- Sebastian Bergne (born 1966), British industrial designer

== See also ==
- Mount Bergne
