= Hertslet =

Hertslet is a surname. Notable people with the surname include:

- Cecil Hertslet (1850–1934), British diplomat
- Sir Edward Hertslet (1824–1902), British librarian
- Lewis Hertslet (1787–1870), British librarian and editor of state papers
