= Giopato & Coombes =

Italian lighting studio

Giopato & Coombes is a lighting studio based in Italy and founded by Cristiana Giopato and Christopher Coombes. Seeking to combine contemporary design with Italian manufacturing methods, the lighting studio has a gallery in Paris, as well as one in Milan, to showcase its products and exhibits. Their work has been shown at Milan Design Week, as well as other design fairs in France, South Korea, and others.

== History ==
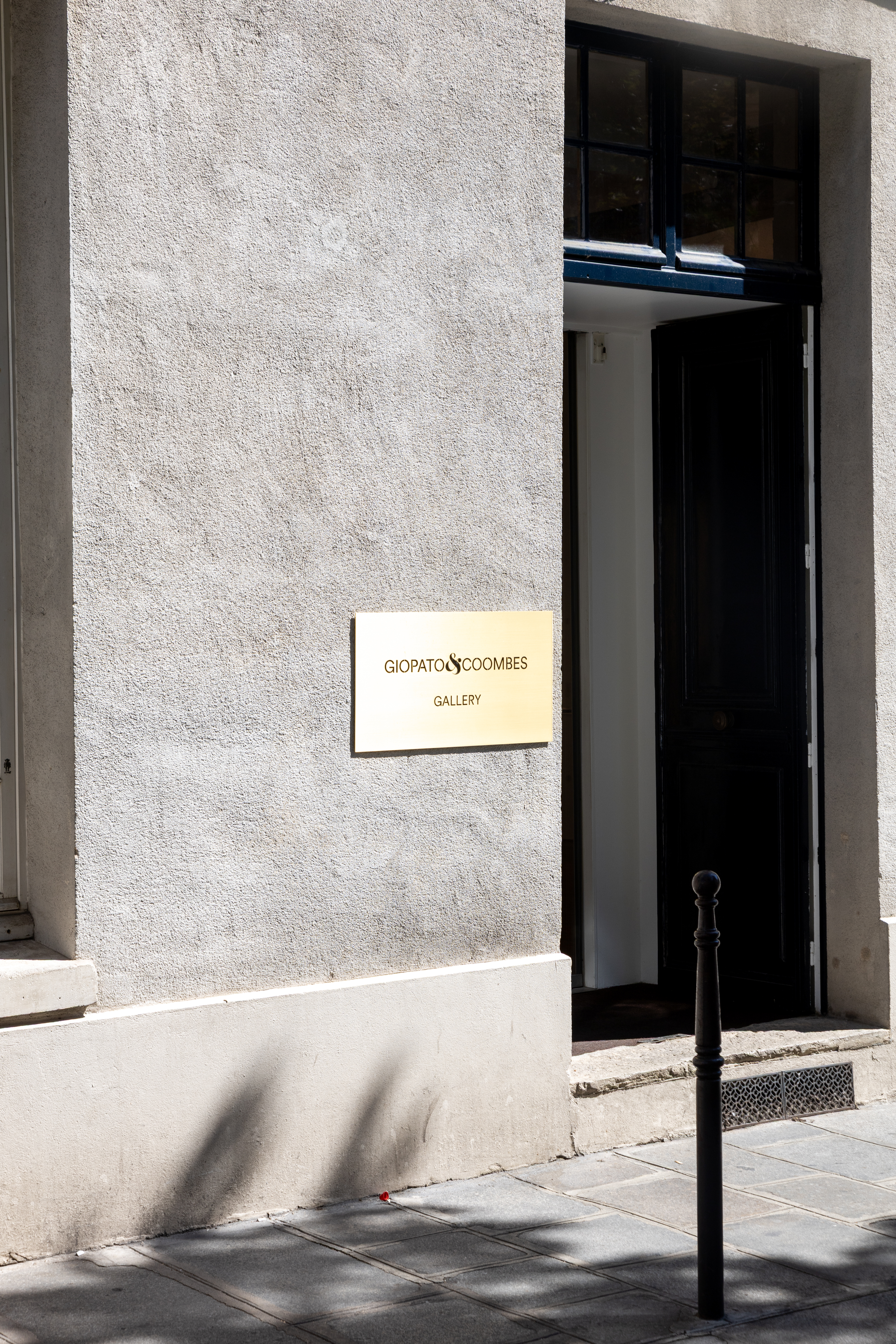
Outside of the Giopato & Coombes Gallery in Paris.

Giopato and Coombes founded their lighting studio in 2014, in Treviso, Italy, with an emphasis on combining "functional design with art research." Giopato had studied Industrial Design at the Politecnico di Milano and later Architecture in Venice, while Coombes studied Industrial Design at Brunel University of London and then worked for George Sowden and Sebastian Bergne. Their warehouse in Treviso was designed by Studio Pazzogna.

Giopato & Coombes has shown installations at Milan Design Week in their own gallery space. There, in 2021, they showed their Fragments of Infinity exhibit, with lights from their Milky Way collection. In 2022, they debuted their Maehwa lamp collection. In 2024, they showed the A Thousand Landscapes exhibit in their Milan gallery, which they also showed at the Suite NY showroom in New York City. In 2025, they showed their Scarabei exhibit.

The lighting studio has also shown their work at other venues. In 2014, they were selected by Giulio Cappellini to design the interior of an Italian-made helicopter, and in 2017, they presented ornamental lighting at Salone del Mobile. Their dewdrop chandelier was shown at Maison et Objet in 2019, and their Korean-inspired light sculptures appeared at Define: Seoul in 2024. Their Bruma collection also appeared at the Alcova design show in 2024.
