= Great College Street =

Street in the City of Westminster, in Central London

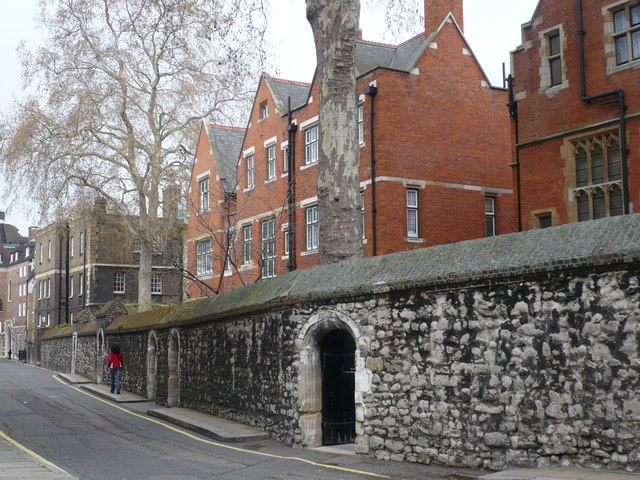
- A view west along Great College Street to Dean's Yard and Tufton Street

- Location within City of Westminster
- Maintained by: Transport for London
- Location: Central London, Westminster, London
- Postal code: SW1
- Nearest Tube station: Westminster
- Coordinates: 51.4976°N 0.1274°W
- East end: Millbank
- West end: Tufton Street

Great College Street is a street in Westminster, London. The street was first laid out in the 1720s but it has seen many alterations and much rebuilding in the later 19th and early 20th centuries. Its proximity to the Palace of Westminster has made it a popular choice for politicians looking for homes within Parliament's Division bell area; the most notable being No.17, Great College Street, which was home to Alfred Milner, 1st Viscount Milner at the start of the 20th century and to Margaret Thatcher at its end.

== Location ==
Great College Street runs in a dog-leg from Millbank in the east to Tufton Street in the west. To the north it is bordered firstly by College Green, a public space frequently used for political interviews, and then by College Garden, a private garden belonging to Westminster Abbey. The north side of the street along this length is fronted by a rubble stone wall. (Note: Bradley and Pevsner date the wall to 1374-76.) The street terminates at its western end with a left-hand junction into Tufton Street. To the right is an entrance into Dean's Yard.

== History and description ==
These narrow houses, three or four storeys high - one for eating, one for sleeping, a third for company, a fourth underground for the kitchen, a fifth perhaps at the top for servants - give the idea of a cage with its sticks and birds

— Louis Simond - Journal of a Tour and Residence in Great Britain (1817)

The original houses on the street date from the early Georgian era, being laid out c.1720. Their plans follow what John Summerson called "the insistent verticality of the London house" [see box]. There are many later insertions, mainly of the later 19th and 20th centuries.

Simon Bradley and Nikolaus Pevsner, in the 2003 revised London 6: Westminster in the Buildings of England series, describe Great College Street as, "charming with an atmosphere like a cathedral close".

The street's proximity to the Palace of Westminster has made it a popular choice for politicians looking for homes. In the early 20th century Sir Charles Trevelyan, who held education offices in both Liberal and Labour governments in the early 20th century; Walter Runciman, a Liberal politician who held a range of government posts from 1905 to 1937; and Alfred Lyttelton, who enjoyed a short career as Secretary of State for the Colonies, all had homes there. The most notable "political" house is No.17. Alfred Milner lived there during World War I and conducted negotiations at the house with Arthur Lee, 1st Viscount Lee of Fareham, who lived over the wall opposite in No.2 Abbey Gardens, when Lloyd George was seeking to entice Milner to join his coalition government after the fall of H. H. Asquith. At the end of the 20th century, No.17 was home to Lord McAlpine, the Tory Party treasurer and the scene of much intrigue as the party began its descent into civil war over the question of the UK's relations with Europe. On the fall of Margaret Thatcher in November 1990 No.17 was lent, at her suggestion, to John Major, who ran his successful campaign to replace her as Tory leader from the house. Thatcher then stayed at the house for some months after her resignation. As a sign of the increasingly fractious nature of her relations, and those of her allies including McAlpine, with Major, No.17 was later used as the headquarters of the Tory rebels who sought to bring down Major's government over disagreements on the Maastricht Treaty. (Note: As at October 2024 No.17 was for sale.)

== Buildings, occupants and listing designations ==
- No.3 - Grade II* listed, forming part of a large block fronting Millbank. Designed by W. D. Caröe for the Church Commissioners.
- No.10, Fielden House - by Victor Heal, of 1936-37 in a Neo-Georgian style.
- No.14 - by Horace Field for Sir Charles Trevelyan, of 1905.
- No.15 - by Horace Field for Walter Runciman, of 1905.
- No.16 - Grade II* listed with an additional dormer storey by Edwin Lutyens for Alfred Lyttelton. In the 19th century, it was the home of the librarian Lewis Hertslet and in the 20th, after the Lytteltons' tenure it was occupied by J. C. C. Davidson, later Viscount Davidson, Conservative Party treasurer.
- No.17 and No.18 - Grade II* listed, original 18th century houses. In the late 20th century No.17 was owned by Lord McAlpine who lent the house to Margaret Thatcher following her fall from power in 1990. At the beginning of the 20th century, it was home to Alfred Milner.
- No.22, St Edward's House - Grade II listed, by Edward Burgess for the Society of St John the Evangelist.

== Gallery ==
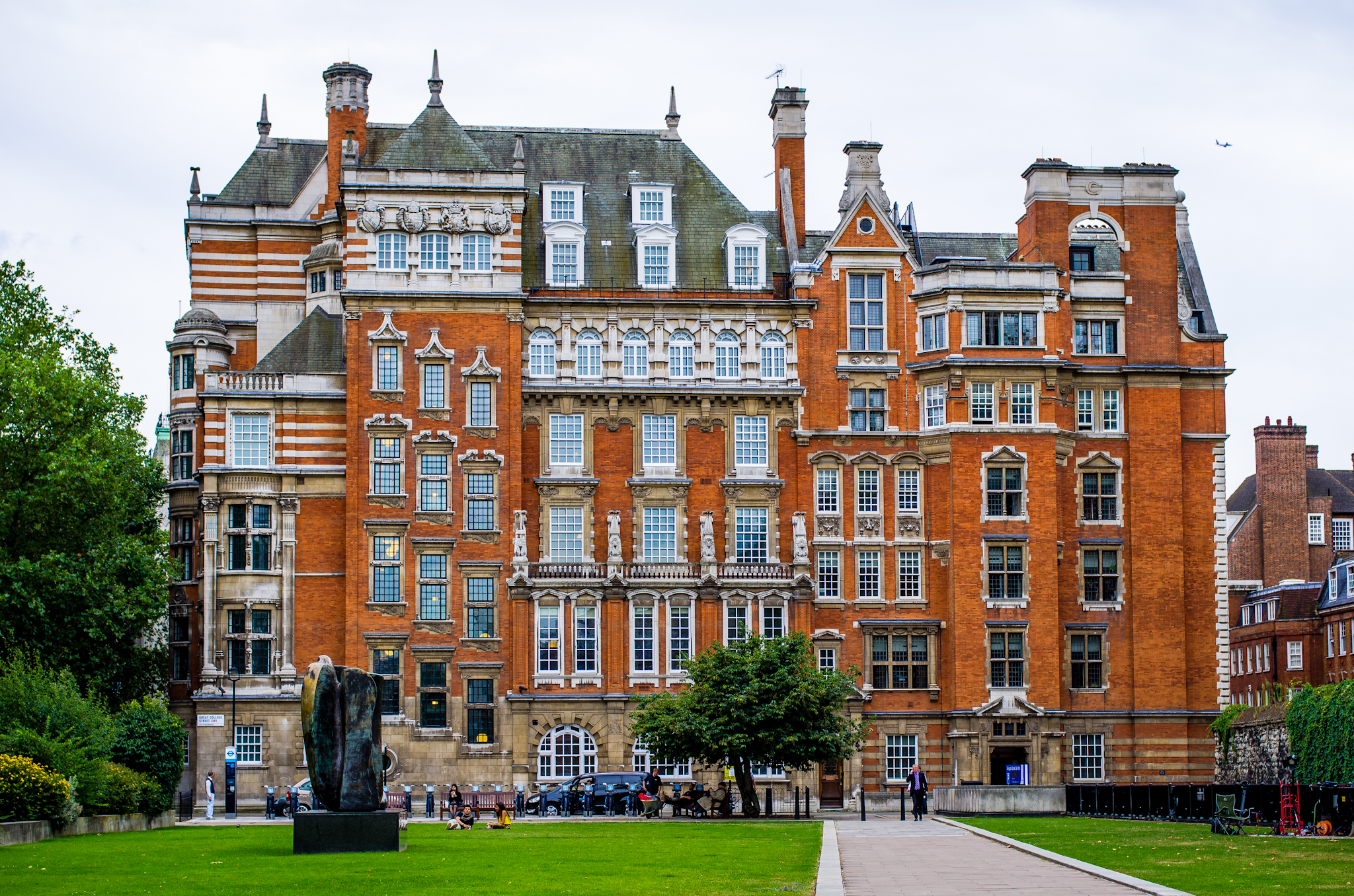
Millbank House by W. D. Caröe which incorporates No.3 Great College Street

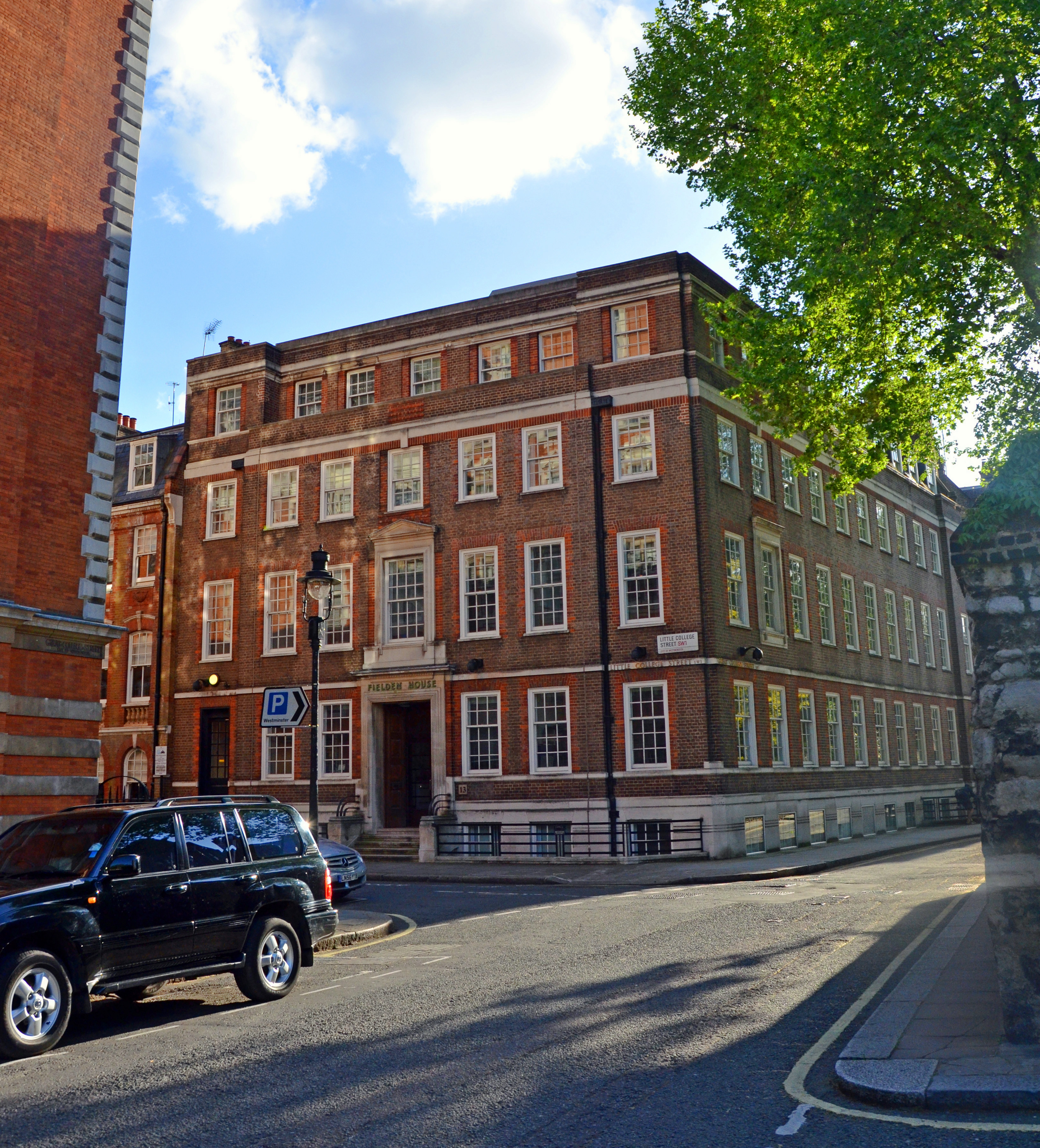
No.10, Fielden House, on the corner with Little College Street

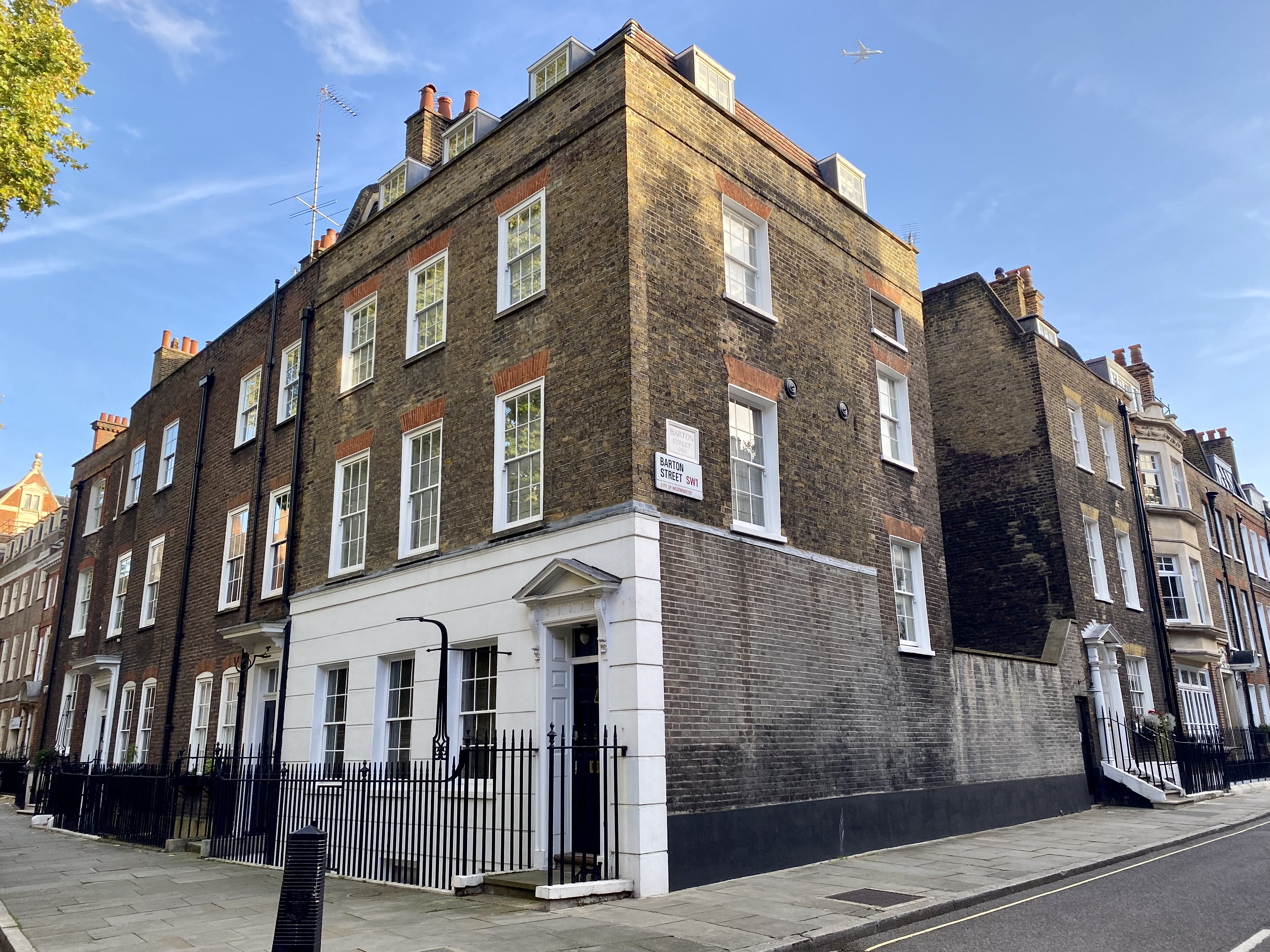
No.19 on the corner with Barton Street. No.17 is two houses to the left

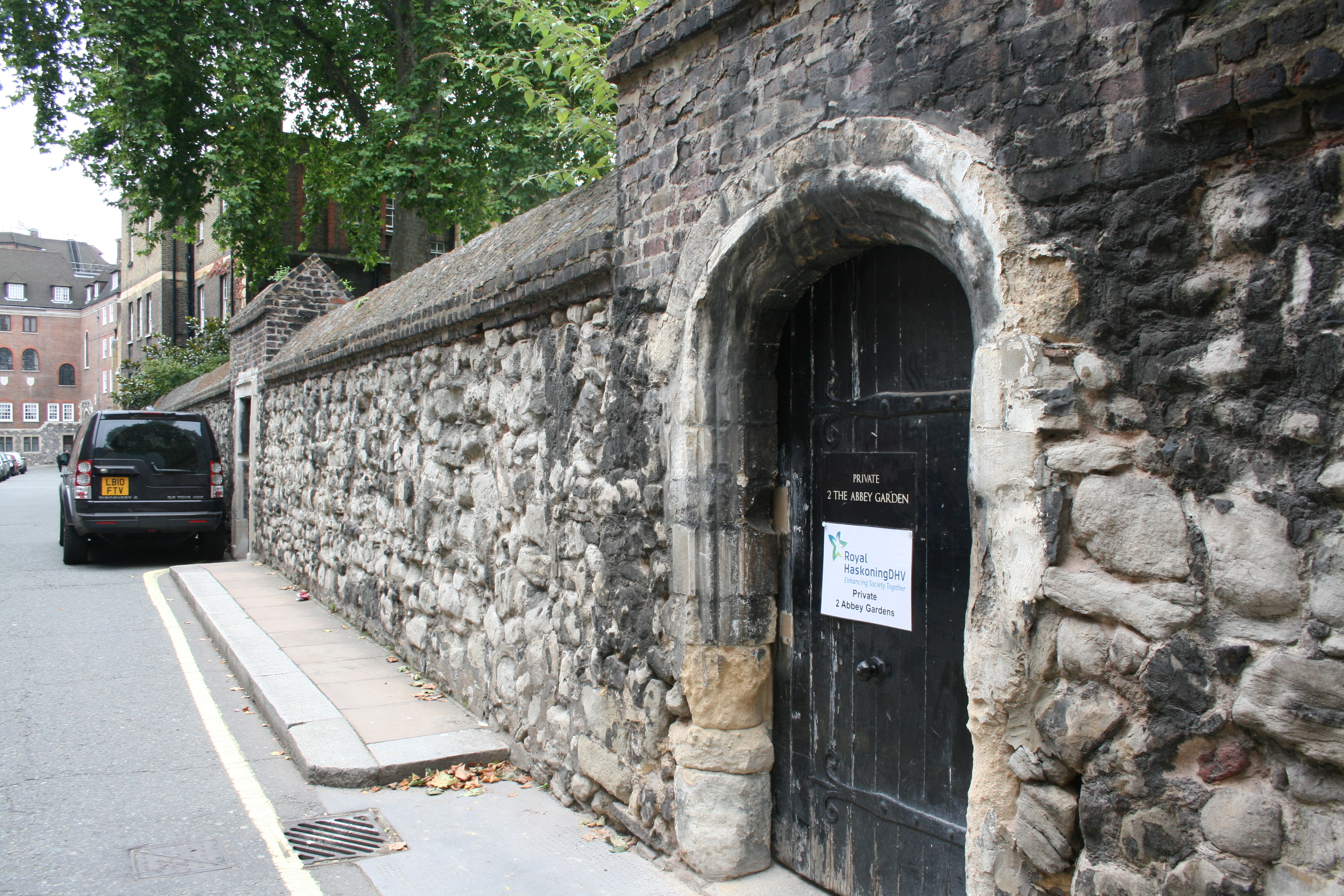
The medieval wall along the north side of the street which encloses College Garden

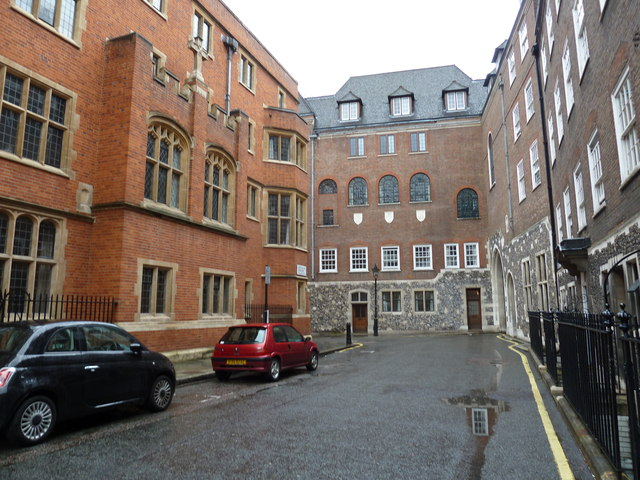
The western end with St Edwards House to the left, Church House in the centre, and the entry to Dean's Yard to the right

== Sources ==
- Bradley, Simon; Pevsner, Nikolaus (2003). London: Westminster. The Buildings of England. New Haven, US, London, UK: Yale University Press. ISBN 9780300095951. OCLC 609428632.
- Lockwood, P. A. (1964). "Milner's entry into the War Cabinet, December 1916". The Historical Journal. 7 (1). Cambridge University Press: 120–134. doi:10.1017/S0018246X00025280. JSTOR 3020520.
- Summerson, John (1978). Georgian London. London: Barrie & Jenkins. OCLC 922574924.
