= Enlistment Act 1794 =

Act of the Parliament of Great Britain

- Act of Parliament
- Parliament of Great Britain
- Long title: An Act to enable Subjects of France to enlist as Soldiers in Regiments to serve on the Continent of Europe, and in certain other Places; and to enable His Majesty to grant Commissions to Subjects of France to serve and receive Pay as Officers, in such Regiments, or as Engineers, under certain Restrictions.
- Citation: 34 Geo. 3. c. 43
- Introduced by: William Pitt the Younger (Commons)
- Territorial extent: Great Britain

Dates
- Royal assent: 9 May 1794
- Commencement: 9 May 1794 (Note: The Acts of Parliament (Commencement) Act 1793.)
- Repealed: 21 August 1871
Other legislation
Repealed by	Statute Law Revision Act 1871
Relates to	Army and Navy Act 1800; Enlistment of Foreigners Act 1804

Status: Repealed

Text of statute as originally enacted

The Enlistment Act 1794 (34 Geo. 3. c. 43) (also known as the Emigrant Corps Bill or the Emigrant Corps Act) was an act of the Parliament of Great Britain that allowed the British government to create regiments of émigrés from France. This specific legislation was needed to enlist men who were not British subjects in the British Army and to allow George III to commission foreigners as officers. The Act was a major break from the military conventions about enlisting soldiers from other states in the Eighteenth Century. The Act expired with the Peace of Amiens.

== Background and need for the act ==
Many of those who fled France in the wake of the French Revolution were soldiers and officers of the French Royal Army. With the outbreak of French Revolutionary Wars in 1792 émigré nobles set up units and formed Armée des émigrés. Soon after the France declaration of war on Britain in February 1793, émigré officers also offered to raise units for the British Army. The British government welcomed the additional manpower.

The first unit to be raised was the Loyal Emigrant Regiment by Louis, duc de La Chastre. To avoid political problems, the officers were commissioned by George III as Elector of Hanover and then they were transferred to British pay. This arrangement was not practical for further offers, so new legislation was introduced to allow émigré units to be raised and maintained directly by Britain.

As the French officers of these units were Catholic, they needed exemptions from British laws against Catholics. Also, throughout the Eighteenth Century, many British MPs has been hostile to employing foreign troops within the British Army.

== Debates in Parliament ==
There were significant debates in the House of Commons about the "Bill to enable subjects of France to enlist as Soldiers". The political arguments focused on two areas. Firstly, there were concerns over the government using foreign troops within the British isles, which was seen as a threat to British political liberty. Secondly, that by recruiting Frenchmen Britain was changing the nature of the war with France, and showing that it wanted to overturn the French Revolutionary government. Charles James Fox, one of the MPs who said most on this, thought that the war would be longer and more violent as a result, and negotiating a peace much harder. Despite these concerns being raised in Parliament, the government had enough of a majority for the bill to pass, although votes were held at each stage.

=== Passage through Parliament ===
- Ordered: 7 April 1794
- Presented and read; ordered to be printed: 8 April 1794
- Committed: 11 April 1794
- Considered: 14 April 1794
- Reported; to be engrossed; day appointed for Third Reading: 16 April 1794
- Passed: 17 April 1794
- Agreed to in the House of Lords: 6 May 1794
- Received Royal Assent: 9 May 1794

== Provisions ==
The main terms of the act were:

- It was declared legal for Frenchmen to enlist and for George III to commission them as officers.
- Their terms of enlistment restricted their service to the continent of Europe, the Channel Islands, and any French territories outside Europe before 1792.
- Officers held temporary rank and were not entitled to half-pay when units were disbanded.
- Soldiers or officers in the units were not liable to prosecution or penalties under laws against Catholics.
- The units could be landed in Great Britain, but notice of this had to given to Parliament. The units were not allowed more than five miles from the coast, and limited to a maximum of 5,000 men.
- The soldiers and officers were subject to the Mutiny Act and Articles of War.
- The act was in force for the duration of war and extended to the end of the next session of Parliament after the war ended.

== Subsequent developments ==
The whole act was repealed by section 1 of, and the schedule to, the Statute Law Revision Act 1871 (34 & 35 Vict. c. 116), which came into force on 21 August 1871.
