= Edward Hertslet =

Sir Edward Hertslet (3 February 1824 – 4 August 1902) was an English librarian of the Foreign Office, known as an author of reference works.

== Life ==
Born at 16 College Street, Westminster, on 3 February 1824, he was youngest son of Lewis Hertslet, from a Swiss background, by his first wife, Hannah Harriet Jemima Cooke. Educated privately near Hounslow, he was on 23 March 1840 temporarily attached to the library of the Foreign Office under his father, who was then librarian. On 8 January 1842 he received a permanent appointment, on 28 August 1844 became second clerk, and a little later the senior clerk. On 1 April 1855 he became sub-librarian, and on 19 November 1857 librarian.

Hertslet was involved in Foreign Office work through memoranda by him matching history, geography, or international law with major public questions which came before the government. With the post of librarian he combined, up to 1870, the agency for members of the diplomatic and consular services. After 1873, when John Brodribb Bergne died, Hertslet took his place as adviser on treaty matters. He was attached to the mission of Lord Beaconsfield to the Congress of Berlin in 1878, and was knighted for his services. He was also one of the delegates for the examination of the boundary between British and Dutch territory in Borneo in June 1889.

Hertslet was retained at the Foreign Office after the normal retiring age of 65, to 2 February 1896. He was made C.B. on 21 February 1874, and K.C.B. on 20 August 1892. He died at his residence, Bellevue, Richmond after an operation, on 4 August 1902. He had resided at Richmond since 1852 and was active in local affairs.

== Works ==
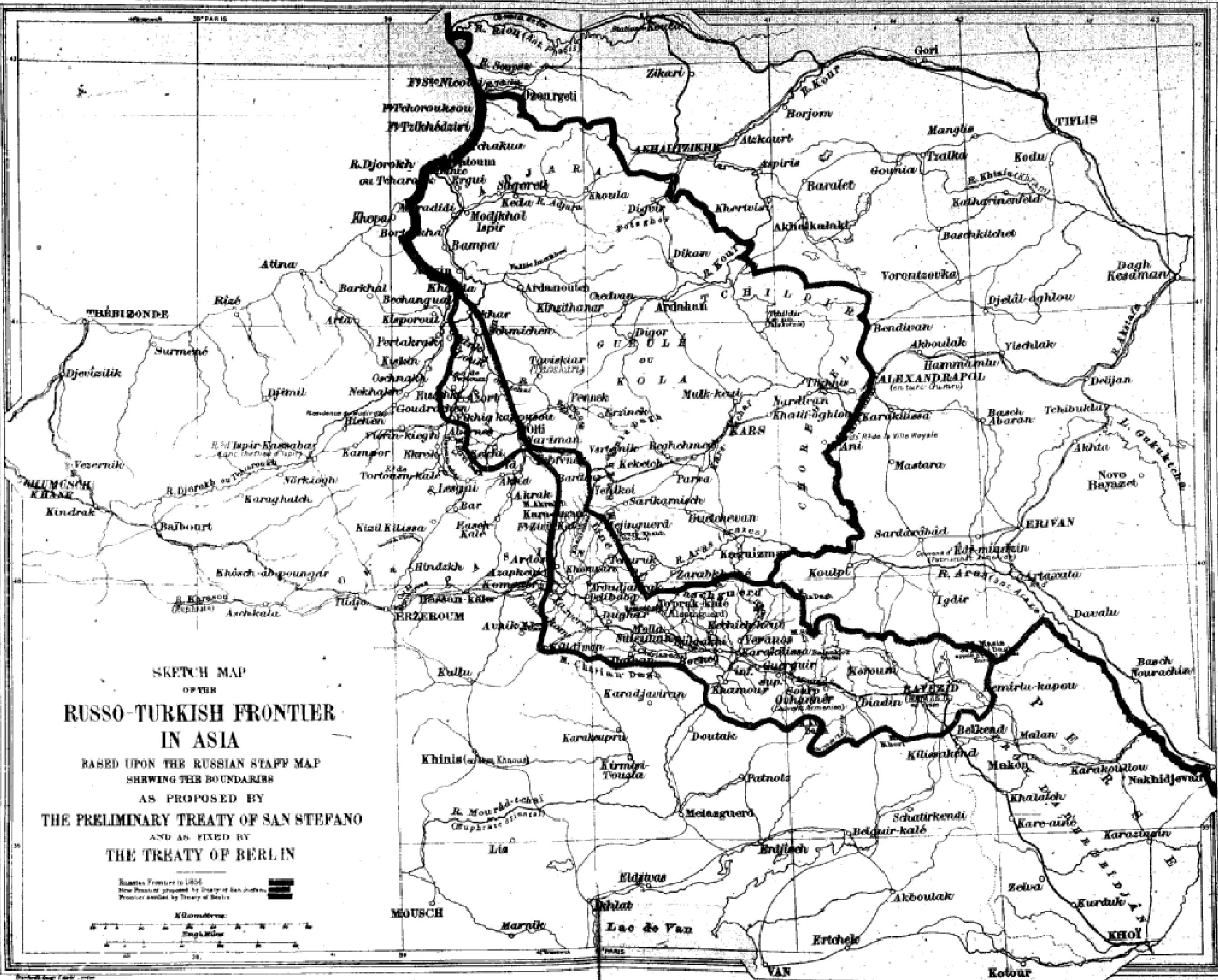
Sketch map of the Russo-Turkish frontier in Asia. According to the Preliminary Treaty of San Stefano and fixed by The Treaty of Berlin, from The Map of Europe by Treaty compiled by Edward Hertslet

Hertslet continued a number of publications which his father had begun; the main ones were:

- The Foreign Office List,'of which he was joint-editor from its third year (1865), and sole editor and proprietor from 1864 to his death.
- Vols. xii.-xvi. with the index to the whole series and with the help of his eldest son, Sir Cecil Hertslet, vols. xvii.-xix. of the collection of treaties and conventions known as Hertslet's Commercial Treaties (1871–1895).
- British and Foreign State Papers, of which he was responsible for vols. 27–82; his name appears only on later volumes. These state papers then became government publications.

Hertslet also compiled The Map of Europe by Treaty, vols, i.-iii. 1875; vol. iv. 1896, as well as The Map of Africa by Treaty, 2 vols. 1894. He was author of Recollections of the Old Foreign Office (1901).

== Family ==
Hertslet married Eden (died 1899), daughter of John Bull, clerk of the journals of the House of Commons. Of his nine sons and three daughters, six sons and a daughter survived him. His third son, Godfrey L. P. Hertslet, in the library of the Foreign Office, succeeded him as editor of the Foreign Office List and was also assistant editor of Hertslet's Commercial Treaties.

== Notes ==
Attribution

This article incorporates text from a publication now in the public domain: Lee, Sidney, ed. (1912). "Edward Hertslet". Dictionary of National Biography (2nd supplement). Vol. 2. London: Smith, Elder & Co.
