= List of acts of the Parliament of Great Britain from 1794 =

This is a complete list of acts of the Parliament of Great Britain for the year 1794.

For acts passed until 1707, see the list of acts of the Parliament of England and the list of acts of the Parliament of Scotland. See also the list of acts of the Parliament of Ireland.

For acts passed from 1801 onwards, see the list of acts of the Parliament of the United Kingdom. For acts of the devolved parliaments and assemblies in the United Kingdom, see the list of acts of the Scottish Parliament, the list of acts of the Northern Ireland Assembly, and the list of acts and measures of Senedd Cymru; see also the list of acts of the Parliament of Northern Ireland.

The number shown after each act's title is its chapter number. Acts are cited using this number, preceded by the year(s) of the reign during which the relevant parliamentary session was held; thus the Union with Ireland Act 1800 is cited as "39 & 40 Geo. 3. c. 67", meaning the 67th act passed during the session that started in the 39th year of the reign of George III and which finished in the 40th year of that reign. Note that the modern convention is to use Arabic numerals in citations (thus "41 Geo. 3" rather than "41 Geo. III"). Acts of the last session of the Parliament of Great Britain and the first session of the Parliament of the United Kingdom are both cited as "41 Geo. 3".

Acts passed by the Parliament of Great Britain did not have a short title; however, some of these acts have subsequently been given a short title by acts of the Parliament of the United Kingdom (such as the Short Titles Act 1896).

Before the Acts of Parliament (Commencement) Act 1793 came into force on 8 April 1793, acts passed by the Parliament of Great Britain were deemed to have come into effect on the first day of the session in which they were passed. Because of this, the years given in the list below may in fact be the year before a particular act was passed.

== 34 Geo. 3 ==
The fourth session of the 17th Parliament of Great Britain, which met from 21 January 1794 until 11 July 1794.

This session was also traditionally cited as 34 G. 3.

=== Public acts ===
Short title	Citation	Royal assent
Long title
National Debt Act 1794 (repealed)	34 Geo. 3. c. 1	20 February 1794
An act for raising the sum of eleven millions by way of annuities. (Repealed by Statute Law Revision Act 1870 (33 & 34 Vict. c. 69))
Duties on Worts, Wash, etc. Act 1794 (repealed)	34 Geo. 3. c. 2	21 February 1794
An act for granting to his Majesty certain additional duties upon worts, wash, and other liquors, brewed or made in England, for extracting spirits for home consumption, and upon spirits made in Scotland and imported into England. (Repealed by Statute Law Revision Act 1861 (24 & 25 Vict. c. 101))
Duties on Spirits, etc. Act 1794 (repealed)	34 Geo. 3. c. 3	21 February 1794
An act for granting to his Majesty certain additional duties on foreign Spirits imported into Great Britain. (Repealed by Statute Law Revision Act 1861 (24 & 25 Vict. c. 101))
Duties on Spirits, etc. (No. 2) Act 1794 (repealed)	34 Geo. 3. c. 4	21 February 1794
An act for making perpetual certain duties on foreign spirits, and on sugar, imported into Great Britain. (Repealed by Statute Law Revision Act 1861 (24 & 25 Vict. c. 101))
Trade with America Act 1794 (repealed)	34 Geo. 3. c. 5	21 February 1794
An act to continue the laws now in force for regulating the trade between the subjects of his Majesty's dominions and the inhabitants of the territories belonging to the united states of America so far as the same relate to the trade and commerce carried on between this kingdom and the inhabitants of the countries belonging to the said united states. (Repealed by Statute Law Revision Act 1871 (34 & 35 Vict. c. 116))
Marine Mutiny Act 1794 (repealed)	34 Geo. 3. c. 6	21 February 1794
An act for the regulation of his Majesty's marine forces while on shore. (Repealed by Statute Law Revision Act 1871 (34 & 35 Vict. c. 116))
Malt Duties Act 1794 (repealed)	34 Geo. 3. c. 7	21 February 1794
An act for continuing and granting to his Majesty certain duties upon malt, mum, cyder, and perry, for the service of the year one thousand seven hundred and ninety-four. (Repealed by Statute Law Revision Act 1871 (34 & 35 Vict. c. 116))
Land Tax Act 1794 (repealed)	34 Geo. 3. c. 8	21 February 1794
An act for granting an aid to his Majesty by a land tax, to be raised in Great Britain, for the service of the year one thousand seven hundred and ninety-four. (Repealed by Statute Law Revision Act 1871 (34 & 35 Vict. c. 116))
Aid to Government of France Act 1794 (repealed)	34 Geo. 3. c. 9	1 March 1794
An act for preventing money or effects in the hands of his Majesty's subjects, belonging to or disposeable by persons resident in France, being applied to the use of the persons exercising the powers of government in France; and for preserving the property thereof for the benefit of the individual owners thereof. (Repealed by Statute Law Revision Act 1871 (34 & 35 Vict. c. 116))
Stamps Act 1794 (repealed)	34 Geo. 3. c. 10	1 March 1794
An act for repealing the stamp duties on gloves and mittens sold by retail. (Repealed by Statute Law Revision Act 1871 (34 & 35 Vict. c. 116))
Stamps (No. 2) Act 1794 (repealed)	34 Geo. 3. c. 11	1 March 1794
An act for repealing the duties on the registry of burials, births, marriages and christenings. (Repealed by Statute Law Revision Act 1871 (34 & 35 Vict. c. 116))
Indemnity Act 1794 (repealed)	34 Geo. 3. c. 12	1 March 1794
An act to indemnify such persons as have omitted to qualify themselves for offices and employments; and to indemnify justices of the peace, or others, who have omitted to register or deliver in their qualifications within the time limited by law, and for giving further time for those purposes; and to indemnify members and officers, in cities, corporations, and borough towns, whose admissions have been omitted to be stamped according to law, or having been stamped, have been lost or mislaid, and for allowing them time to provide admissions duly stamped; to give further time to such persons as have omitted to make and file affidavits of the execution of indentures of clerks to attornies and solicitors; and for indemnifying deputy lieutenants and officers of the militia, who have neglected to transmit descriptions of their qualifications to the clerks of the peace within the time limited by law, and for allowing further time for that purpose. (Repealed by Promissory Oaths Act 1871 (34 & 35 Vict. c. 48))
Mutiny Act 1794 (repealed)	34 Geo. 3. c. 13	1 March 1794
An act for punishing mutiny and desertion; and for the better payment of the army and their quarters. (Repealed by Statute Law Revision Act 1871 (34 & 35 Vict. c. 116))
Stamps (No. 3) Act 1794 (repealed)	34 Geo. 3. c. 14	28 March 1794
An Act for granting to his Majesty certain stamp duties on indentures of clerkships to solicitors and attornies in any of the courts in England therein mentioned. (Repealed by Inland Revenue Repeal Act 1870 (33 & 34 Vict. c. 99))
Duties on Bricks and Tiles Act 1794 (repealed)	34 Geo. 3. c. 15	28 March 1794
An act for granting to his Majesty certain additional duties on bricks and tiles made in, or imported into, Great Britain. (Repealed by Duties on Bricks Act 1839 (2 & 3 Vict. c. 24))
Militia Act 1794 (repealed)	34 Geo. 3. c. 16	28 March 1794
An act for augmenting the militia. (Repealed by Statute Law Revision Act 1871 (34 & 35 Vict. c. 116))
Penny Post Act 1794 (repealed)	34 Geo. 3. c. 17	28 March 1794
An act for regulating the postage and conveyance of letters by the carriage called The Penny Post. (Repealed by Post Office (Repeal of Laws) Act 1837 (7 Will. 4. & 1 Vict. c. 32))
Postage Act 1794 (repealed)	34 Geo. 3. c. 18	28 March 1794
An act for granting rates of postage for the conveyance of letters and packets between Great Britain and the islands of Jersey and Guernsey, and within those islands. (Repealed by Post Office (Repeal of Laws) Act 1837 (7 Will. 4. & 1 Vict. c. 32))
Bank of Scotland Act 1794 (repealed)	34 Geo. 3. c. 19	28 March 1794
An act to enable the governor and company of the Bank of Scotland further to increase the capital stock of the said company. (Repealed by Statute Law (Repeals) Act 1981 (c. 19))
Paper Duties Act 1794 (repealed)	34 Geo. 3. c. 20	4 April 1794
An act for repealing the duties on paper, pasteboard, millboard, scaleboard, and glazed paper; and for granting other duties in lieu thereof. (Repealed by Duties on Paper Act 1839 (2 & 3 Vict. c. 23))
National Debt (No. 2) Act 1794 (repealed)	34 Geo. 3. c. 21	4 April 1794
An act for granting annuities to satisfy certain navy and victualling bills; and for providing for the regular payment of all navy and victualling bills that shall be issued in future. (Repealed by Statute Law Revision Act 1870 (33 & 34 Vict. c. 69))
Fishery Act 1794 (repealed)	34 Geo. 3. c. 22	4 April 1794
An act for allowing vessels employed in the Greenland and whale fishery to complete their full number of men, at certain ports, for a limited time. (Repealed by Statute Law Revision Act 1871 (34 & 35 Vict. c. 116))
Linens, etc. Act 1794 (repealed)	34 Geo. 3. c. 23	4 April 1794
An act for amending and making perpetual an act made in the twenty-seventh year of the reign of his present Majesty, intituled, "An act for the encouragement of the arts of designing and printing linens, cottons, callicoes, and muslins, by vesting the properties thereof in the designers, printers, and proprietors, for a limited time." (Note: Designing and Printing of Linens, etc. Act 1787 (27 Geo. 3. c. 38)) (Repealed by Copyright of Designs Act 1842 (5 & 6 Vict. c. 100))
Grand Junction Canal Act 1794	34 Geo. 3. c. 24	28 March 1794
An Act for making certain navigable Cuts from the towns of Buckingham, Aylesbury, and Wendover, in the county of Buckingham, to communicate with the Grand Junction Navigation authorized to be made by an Act of the last Session of Parliament, (Note: Grand Junction Canal Act 1793 (33 Geo. 3. c. 80)) and for amending the said Act.
Wyrley and Essington Canal Act 1794 (repealed)	34 Geo. 3. c. 25	28 March 1794
An Act for extending the Wyrley and Essington canal. (Repealed by Wyrley and Essington Canal Navigation Act 1840 (3 & 4 Vict. c. xxiv))
Peak Forest Canal Act 1794	34 Geo. 3. c. 26	28 March 1794
An Act for making and maintaining a navigable canal from and out of the canal navigation from Manchester to or near Ashton-under-Lyne and Oldham, in the county palatine of Lancaster, at the intended aqueduct bridge in Dukinfield, in the county of Chester, to or near to Chapel Milton, in the county of Derby; and a communication by railways or stone roads from thence to Load's Knowl, within Peak Forest, in the said county of Derby; and a branch from and out of the said intended canal to Whaley Bridge, in the said county of Chester.
Glass Duties Act 1794 (repealed)	34 Geo. 3. c. 27	17 April 1794
An act for granting to his Majesty certain additional duties on glass imported into, or made in Great Britain. (Repealed by Glass Duties Act 1838 (1 & 2 Vict. c. 44))
Loans or Exchequer Bills Act 1794 (repealed)	34 Geo. 3. c. 28	17 April 1794
An act for raising a certain sum of money, by loans or exchequer bills, for the service of the year one thousand seven hundred and ninety-four. (Repealed by Statute Law Revision Act 1871 (34 & 35 Vict. c. 116))
Loans or Exchequer Bills (No. 2) Act 1794 (repealed)	34 Geo. 3. c. 29	17 April 1794
An act for raising a further sum of money, by loans or exchequer bills, for the service of the year one thousand seven hundred and ninety-four. (Repealed by Statute Law Revision Act 1871 (34 & 35 Vict. c. 116))
Militia Pay Act 1794 (repealed)	34 Geo. 3. c. 30	17 April 1794
An act for defraying the charge of the pay and cloathing of the militia, in that part of Great Britain called England, for one year, beginning the twenty-fifth day of March one thousand seven hundred and ninety-four. (Repealed by Statute Law Revision Act 1871 (34 & 35 Vict. c. 116))
Volunteer Corps Act 1794 (repealed)	34 Geo. 3. c. 31	17 April 1794
An act for encouraging and disciplining such corps or companies of men, as shall voluntarily inroll themselves for the defence of their counties, towns, or coasts, or for the general defence of the kingdom, during the present war. (Repealed by Statute Law Revision Act 1871 (34 & 35 Vict. c. 116))
Stamp Duties Act 1794 (repealed)	34 Geo. 3. c. 32	17 April 1794
An act for enabling the commissioners of the stamp duties to stamp bills of exchange and notes in certain cases. (Repealed by Statute Law Revision Act 1871 (34 & 35 Vict. c. 116))
Excise Duties Act 1794 (repealed)	34 Geo. 3. c. 33	17 April 1794
An act for making perpetual certain duties of excise on distilleries, and on licences granted to distillers, in Scotland; and for appropriating the said duties. (Repealed by Statute Law Revision Act 1861 (24 & 25 Vict. c. 101))
Exportation Act 1794 (repealed)	34 Geo. 3. c. 34	17 April 1794
An act for indemnifying all persons who have been concerned in advising or carrying into execution, an order of the lords commissioners of his Majesty's treasury, respecting the exportation of pot ashes or pearl ashes; for preventing suits in consequence of the same; for authorising his Majesty to prohibit the exportation, or carrying coastwise, of pot ashes or pearl ashes; and for making further provisions relative thereto. (Repealed by Customs Law Repeal Act 1825 (6 Geo. 4. c. 105))
Governors, etc., of West Indies Islands Act 1794 (repealed)	34 Geo. 3. c. 35	17 April 1794
An act for indemnifying governors, lieutenant governors, and persons acting as such, in the West India islands, who have permitted the importation and exportation of goods and commodities in foreign bottoms. (Repealed by Statute Law Revision Act 1871 (34 & 35 Vict. c. 116))
Continuance of Laws Act 1794 (repealed)	34 Geo. 3. c. 36	17 April 1794
An act to continue several laws relating to the exportation of culm to Lisbon, and to the ascertaining the strength of spirits by Clarke's hydrometer. (Repealed by Statute Law Revision Act 1871 (34 & 35 Vict. c. 116))
Mersey and Irwell Navigation Act 1794	34 Geo. 3. c. 37	28 March 1794
An Act for altering an act, passed in the seventh year of the reign of his late majesty King George the First, intituled, "An Act for making the rivers Mercy and Irwell navigable from Liverpool to Manchester, in the county palatine of Lancaster," (Note: Rivers Mercy and Irwell Navigation Act 1720 (7 Geo. 1. St. 1. c. 15)) by incorporating the proprietors of the said navigation; (Note: The Company of Proprietors of the Mersey and Irwell Navigation.) and to declare their respective shares therein to be a personal estate.
Warwick and Napton Canal Act 1794	34 Geo. 3. c. 38	28 March 1794
An act for making and maintaining a navigable canal out of and from the Warwick and Birmingham canal, now cutting, or intended to be cut, in the parish of Budbrooke, in the county of Warwick, into the Oxford canal, in the parish of Braunston, in the county of Northampton.
Montgomeryshire Canal Act 1794	34 Geo. 3. c. 39	28 March 1794
An act for making a navigable canal from or near Porthywain lime rocks, in the parish of Llanyblodwell, in the county of Salop, to or near Newtown, in the county of Montgomery; and also certain collateral cuts from the said canal.
Lottery Act 1794 (repealed)	34 Geo. 3. c. 40	9 May 1794
An act for granting to his Majesty a certain sum of money to be raised by a lottery. (Repealed by Statute Law Revision Act 1871 (34 & 35 Vict. c. 116))
East India Company (Money) Act 1794 (repealed)	34 Geo. 3. c. 41	9 May 1794
An act to impower the East India company to continue a bond debt of two millions and to increase the same by a further sum as circumstances may require. (Repealed by East India Loans Act 1937 (1 Edw. 8 & 1 Geo. 6. c. 14))
Prize Act 1794 (repealed)	34 Geo. 3. c. 42	9 May 1794
An act for granting to foreign ships, put under his Majesty's protection, the privileges of prize ships, under certain regulations and restrictions; for allowing aliens in foreign colonies, surrendered to his Majesty, to exercise the occupations of merchants or factors; and for repealing an act, passed in the twelfth year of the reign of his late Majesty, intituled, "An act for granting a liberty to carry sugars, of the growth, produce, or manufacture, of any of his Majesty's sugar colonies in America, from the said colonies directly to foreign parts, in ships built in Great Britain, and navigated according to law;" (Note: Colonial Trade Act 1738 (12 Geo. 2. c. 30)) and also so much of an act, passed in the fifteenth year of the reign of his late Majesty, (Note: Starr and Bent Act 1741 (15 Geo. 2. c. 33)) as amends the said act. (Repealed by Statute Law Revision Act 1861 (24 & 25 Vict. c. 101))
Enlistment Act 1794 (repealed)	34 Geo. 3. c. 43	9 May 1794
An act to enable subjects of France to enlist as soldiers in regiments to serve on the continent of Europe, and in certain other places; and to enable his Majesty to grant commissions to subjects of France, to serve and receive pay as officers in such regiments, or as engineers under certain conditions. (Repealed by Statute Law Revision Act 1871 (34 & 35 Vict. c. 116))
Courts, Newfoundland, etc. Act 1794 (repealed)	34 Geo. 3. c. 44	9 May 1794
An act to continue an act made in the last session of parliament (Note: Courts (Newfoundland) Act 1793 (33 Geo. 3. c. 76)) for establishing courts of judicature in the island of Newfoundland and to revive and continue so much of two acts made in the tenth (Note: Making of Indigo, etc. Act 1770 (10 Geo. 3. c. 37)) and sixteenth (Note: Whale Fishery, etc. Act 1776 (16 Geo. 3. c. 47)) years of his present Majesty's reign as relates to regulating the fees of the officers of the customs and of the naval officers in the British colonies in America and of the officers of the customs in the island of Newfoundland. (Repealed by Statute Law Revision Act 1861 (24 & 25 Vict. c. 101))
Criminal Court, Norfolk Island Act 1794 (repealed)	34 Geo. 3. c. 45	9 May 1794
An act to enable his Majesty to establish a court of criminal judicature in Norfolk Island. (Repealed by Statute Law Revision Act 1861 (24 & 25 Vict. c. 101))
Common Pleas of Lancaster Act 1794 (repealed)	34 Geo. 3. c. 46	9 May 1794
An act for taking of special bail in actions and suits depending in the court of common pleas of the county palatine of Lancaster. (Repealed by Statute Law Revision Act 1871 (34 & 35 Vict. c. 116))
Families of Militiamen, etc. Act 1794 (repealed)	34 Geo. 3. c. 47	9 May 1794
An act to amend an act, passed in the last session of parliament, (Note: Families of Militiamen Act 1793 (33 Geo. 3. c. 8)) intituled, "An act to provide for the families of persons chosen by lot to serve in the militia of this kingdom, and of substitutes serving therein; and to explain and amend an act of parliament, passed in the twenty-sixth year of his present Majesty, (Note: Militia Act 1786 (26 Geo. 3. c. 107)) intituled, 'An act for amending, and reducing into one act of parliament, the laws relating to the militia in that part of Great Britain called England;'" and also an act, made in this present session of parliament, intituled, "An act for augmenting the militia." (Note: Militia Act 1794 (34 Geo. 3. c. 16)) (Repealed by Relief of Families of Militiamen Act 1803 (43 Geo. 3. c. 47))
Reduction of National Debt Act 1794 (repealed)	34 Geo. 3. c. 48	9 May 1794
An act for granting to his Majesty the sum of two hundred thousand pounds, to be issued and paid to the governor and company of the bank of England, to be by them placed to the account of the commissioners for the reduction of the national debt. (Repealed by Statute Law Revision Act 1861 (24 & 25 Vict. c. 101))
Appropriation Act 1794 (repealed)	34 Geo. 3. c. 49	9 May 1794
An act for granting to his Majesty a certain sum of money out of the consolidated fund; for applying a certain sum of money therein mentioned for the service of the year one thousand seven hundred and ninety-four; and for further appropriating the supplies granted in this session of parliament. (Repealed by Statute Law Revision Act 1871 (34 & 35 Vict. c. 116))
Importation Act 1794 (repealed)	34 Geo. 3. c. 50	9 May 1794
An act for repealing so much of an act, made in the Seventh year of the reign of his present Majesty, (Note: Importation (No. 9) Act 1766 (7 Geo. 3. c. 43)) as directs that no cambrick or lawn shall be imported from Ireland, until the importation of cambricks and French lawns into Ireland shall be prohibited by law; to allow the importation of cambricks and French lawns from the Austrian Netherlands, for a limited time; for making more effectual an act, made in the twenty-fourth year of the reign of his present Majesty, (Note: Smuggling Act 1784(24 Geo. 3. Sess. 2. c. 47)) for the more effectual prevention of smuggling in this kingdom; and for preventing the fraudulent relanding of tobacco shipped for exportation. (Repealed by Customs Law Repeal Act 1825 (6 Geo. 4. c. 105))
Customs Act 1794 (repealed)	34 Geo. 3. c. 51	9 May 1794
An act for granting to his Majesty certain duties of customs, on slate, stone, and marble. (Repealed by Customs Law Repeal Act 1825 (6 Geo. 4. c. 105))
Tiverton Improvement Act 1794	34 Geo. 3. c. 52	4 April 1794
An act for paving, and otherwise improving, the town of Tiverton in the county of Devon.
Huddersfield to Ashton-under-Lyne Canal Act 1794	34 Geo. 3. c. 53	4 April 1794
An act for making and maintaining a navigable canal, from and out of the canal of Sir John Ramsden, baronet, at or near the town of Huddersfield, in the west riding of the county of York, to join and communicate with the canal navigation from Manchester to or near Ashton under Line and Oldham, at or near the town of Ashton under Line aforesaid, in the county palatine of Lancaster.
Habeas Corpus Suspension Act 1794 (repealed)	34 Geo. 3. c. 54	23 May 1794
An act to empower his Majesty to secure and detain such persons as his Majesty shall suspect are conspiring against his person and government. (Repealed by Statute Law Revision Act 1871 (34 & 35 Vict. c. 116))
Duty on Tobacco Act 1794 (repealed)	34 Geo. 3. c. 55	23 May 1794
An act for saving to his Majesty the duty of new subsidy on tabacco, imported into that part of Great Britain called Scotland. (Repealed by Statute Law Revision Act 1871 (34 & 35 Vict. c. 116))
Navy and Victualling Bills Act 1794 (repealed)	34 Geo. 3. c. 56	23 May 1794
An act for extending the time limited by an act of this session (Note: National Debt (No. 2) Act 1794 (34 Geo. 3. c. 21)) for delivering in navy and victualling bills. (Repealed by Statute Law Revision Act 1871 (34 & 35 Vict. c. 116))
Bankrupts Act 1794 (repealed)	34 Geo. 3. c. 57	23 May 1794
An act for further continuing an act, made in the fifth year of the reign of his late Majesty, intituled, "An act to prevent the committing of frauds by bankrupts." (Note: Bankrupts Act 1731 (5 Geo. 2. c. 30)) (Repealed by Statute Law Revision Act 1871 (34 & 35 Vict. c. 116))
Lancaster Palatine Courts Act 1794 (repealed)	34 Geo. 3. c. 58	23 May 1794
An act to prevent the removal of suits from the inferior courts in the county palatine of Lancaster, into the court of common pleas of the said county palatine. (Repealed by Administration of Justice Act 1925 (15 & 16 Geo. 5. c. 28))
Audit of Public Accounts Act 1794 (repealed)	34 Geo. 3. c. 59	23 May 1794
An act for extending the provisions of an act passed in the twenty-fifth year of his present Majesty's reign, (Note: Audit of Public Accounts Act 1785 (25 Geo. 3. c. 52)) for better examining and auditing the publick accounts of the board of ordnance, the commissioners of the navy, the commissioners for victualling the navy, and the commissioners of sick and hurt. (Repealed by Statute Law Revision Act 1871 (34 & 35 Vict. c. 116))
Removal of Convicts Act 1794 (repealed)	34 Geo. 3. c. 60	23 May 1794
An act to continue so much of several laws, respecting the transportation and imprisonment of offenders, as relates to the removal of offenders to temporary places of confinement. (Repealed by Statute Law Revision Act 1871 (34 & 35 Vict. c. 116))
Observance of Lord's Day by Bakers Act 1794 (repealed)	34 Geo. 3. c. 61	23 May 1794
An act for the better observation of the Lord's day, by persons exercising the trade of bakers. (Repealed by Statute Law Revision Act 1871 (34 & 35 Vict. c. 116))
Loans or Exchequer Bills (No. 3) Act 1794 (repealed)	34 Geo. 3. c. 62	23 May 1794
An act for enabling his Majesty to raise the sum of two millions five hundred thousand pounds for the uses and purposes therein mentioned. (Repealed by Statute Law Revision Act 1871 (34 & 35 Vict. c. 116))
New Method of Tanning Act 1794 (repealed)	34 Geo. 3. c. 63	23 May 1794
An act for allowing the exercise of an invention of a new method tanning hides and skins. (Repealed by Statute Law Revision Act 1861 (24 & 25 Vict. c. 101))
Highway Act 1794 (repealed)	34 Geo. 3. c. 64	23 May 1794
An act for the more effectually repairing of such parts of the highways of this kingdom as are to be repaired by two parishes. (Repealed by Highway Act 1835 (5 & 6 Will. 4. c. 50))
Thames Watermen Act 1794 (repealed)	34 Geo. 3. c. 65	23 May 1794
An act for better regulating and governing the watermen, wherrymen, and lightermen, upon the river of Thames, between Gravesend and Windsor. (Repealed by Thames Watermen and Lightermen Act 1827 (7 & 8 Geo. 4. c. lxxv))
Crown Debt from Late Right Honourable Richard Rigby Act 1794 (repealed)	34 Geo. 3. c. 66	23 May 1794
An act to enable the lords commissioners of his Majesty's treasury to ascertain what sum shall be paid into his Majesty's exchequer, in full satisfaction of the debt due on the mortgage made by the late John Gardner Kemeys esq; in trust for the late right honourable Richard Rigby, in case it shall appear to the said lords commissioners that it will be necessary to resort to the mortgaged premises, in order to recover the balance due from the said Richard Rigby to his Majesty. (Repealed by Statute Law Revision Act 1948 (11 & 12 Geo. 6. c. 62))
John Wilkinson's Estate Act 1794 (repealed)	34 Geo. 3. c. 67	23 May 1794
An act for vesting in John Wilkinson esq; in trust for the assignees of Joseph Freeman and Thomas Grace, a messuage and other hereditaments, in St James's square purchased by the said Joseph Freeman, of Matthias de Gandafequi, an alien; and for discharging the same from the right of the crown, in respect of the alienage. (Repealed by Statute Law Revision Act 1948 (11 & 12 Geo. 6. c. 62))
Merchant Shipping Act 1794 (repealed)	34 Geo. 3. c. 68	11 June 1794
An act for the further encouragement of British mariners; and for other purposes therein mentioned. (Repealed by Customs Law Repeal Act 1825 (6 Geo. 4. c. 105))
Insolvent Debtors' Discharge Act 1794 (repealed)	34 Geo. 3. c. 69	11 June 1794
An act for the discharge of certain insolvent debtors. (Repealed by Statute Law Revision Act 1871 (34 & 35 Vict. c. 116))
Customs (No. 2) Act 1794 (repealed)	34 Geo. 3. c. 70	11 June 1794
An act to exempt ships of war, and private ships or vessels of war, taken as prize, from payment of duty. (Repealed by Statute Law Revision Act 1871 (34 & 35 Vict. c. 116))
Supply of Certain Islands with Corn Act 1794 (repealed)	34 Geo. 3. c. 71	11 June 1794
An act for supplying such of the French islands, as may be in his Majesty's possession, with the several sorts of corn, meal, flour, and biscuit, necessary for the maintenance of the inhabitants of the said islands. (Repealed by Statute Law Revision Act 1871 (34 & 35 Vict. c. 116))
Stamps (No. 4) Act 1794 (repealed)	34 Geo. 3. c. 72	11 June 1794
An act to enable the commissioners of his Majesty's stamp duties to stamp the paper used for printing newspapers thereon, in sheets of single demy paper instead of sheets of double demy paper. (Repealed by Stamp Duties on Newspapers Act 1836 (6 & 7 Will. 4. c. 76))
Oaths at Parliamentary Elections Act 1794 (repealed)	34 Geo. 3. c. 73	11 June 1794
An act for directing the appointment of commissioners, to administer certain oaths and declarations required by law to be taken and made by persons offering to vote at the election of members to serve in parliament. (Repealed by Ballot Act 1872 (35 & 36 Vict. c. 33) and Statute Law Revision Act 1872 (35 & 36 Vict. c. 63))
Highways Act 1794 (repealed)	34 Geo. 3. c. 74	11 June 1794
An act for varying some of the provisions in an act of the thirteenth year of his present Majesty's reign, (Note: Highways Act 1773 (13 Geo. 3. c. 78)) respecting the publick highways, within that part of Great Britain called England, which relate to the performance of statute duty. (Repealed by Highway Act 1835 (5 & 6 Will. 4. c. 50))
Crown Land Revenues Act 1794 (repealed)	34 Geo. 3. c. 75	11 June 1794
An act for the better management of the land revenue of the crown, and for the sale of fee farm and other unimproveable rents. (Repealed by Statute Law Revision Act 1861 (24 & 25 Vict. c. 101))
Kent and Devon Fortifications Act 1794	34 Geo. 3. c. 76	11 June 1794
An act for vesting certain messuages, lands, tenements, and hereditaments, in trustees, for the better securing his Majesty's batteries, and other works, in the counties of Kent and Devon.
Haslingden Canal Act 1794	34 Geo. 3. c. 77	4 April 1794
An act for making and maintaining a navigable canal from or nearly from Bury Bridge, in the parish of Bury, by Haslingden, to or nearly to Church Kirk, all in the county palatine of Lancaster.
Rochdale Canal Act 1794	34 Geo. 3. c. 78	4 April 1794
An act for making and maintaining a navigable canal from the Calder Navigation, at or near Sowerby Bridge wharf, in the parish of Halifax, in the west riding of the county of York, to join the canal of his grace the duke of Bridgewater, in the parish of Manchester, in the county palatine of Lancaster; and also certain cuts from the said intended canal.
Effects of Residents in France Act 1794 (repealed)	34 Geo. 3. c. 79	7 July 1794
An act for more effectually preserving money or effects, in the hands of his Majesty's subjects, belonging to or disposeable by, persons resident in France, for the benefit of the individual owners thereof. (Repealed by Statute Law Revision Act 1871 (34 & 35 Vict. c. 116))
Slave Trade Act 1794 (repealed)	34 Geo. 3. c. 80	7 July 1794
An act to continue, for a limited time, and to amend an act, passed in the last session of parliament, intituled, "An act to continue, for a limited time, and to amend several acts of parliament for regulating the shipping, and carrying slaves in British vessels from the coast of Africa." (Note: Slave Trade Act 1793 (33 Geo. 3. c. 73)) (Repealed by Statute Law Revision Act 1871 (34 & 35 Vict. c. 116))
City of London Militia Act 1794 (repealed)	34 Geo. 3. c. 81	7 July 1794
An act for amending so much of an act, passed in the thirteenth and fourteenth years of the reign of his late majesty King Charles the Second, intituled, "An act for ordering the forces in the several counties of this kingdom," (Note: City of London Militia Act 1662 (14 Cha. 2. c. 3)) as relates to the militia of the city of London and for the better ordering the same. (Repealed by London Militia Act 1796 (36 Geo. 3. c. 92))
Aliens Act 1794 (repealed)	34 Geo. 3. c. 82	7 July 1794
An act to continue an act, made in the last session of parliament, intituled, "An act for establishing regulations respecting aliens arriving in this kingdom, or resident therein, in certain cases." (Note: Aliens Act 1793 (33 Geo. 3. c. 4)) (Repealed by Statute Law Revision Act 1871 (34 & 35 Vict. c. 116))
Election Petitions Act 1794 (repealed)	34 Geo. 3. c. 83	7 July 1794
An act to explain so much of an act, made in the twenty-eighth year of his present Majesty's reign, intituled, "An act for the further regulation of the trials of controverted elections, or returns of members to serve in parliament," (Note: Controverted Elections Act 1788 (28 Geo. 3. c. 52)) as relates to the time of presenting certain renewed petitions, and taking the same into consideration. (Repealed by Controverted Elections Act 1828 (9 Geo. 4. c. 22))
Penitentiary for Convicts Act 1794 (repealed)	34 Geo. 3. c. 84	7 July 1794
An act for erecting a penitentiary house or houses for confining and employing convicts. (Repealed by Millbank Prison Act 1843 (6 & 7 Vict. c. 26))
River Nene Navigation Act 1794 (repealed)	34 Geo. 3. c. 85	17 April 1794
An act to remove certain difficulties in the execution of the powers vested in the commissioners appointed by two acts, passed in the thirteenth year of the reign of Queen Anne, (Note: River Nene (Northampton to Peterborough) Navigation Act 1713 (13 Ann. c. 19)) and in the eleventh year of the reign of King George the First, (Note: River Nene (Norfolk) Navigation Act 1724 (11 Geo. 1. c. 19)) for making the river Nine or Nen, running from Northampton to Peterborough, navigable, so far as the same relate to the navigation between Peterborough and Thrapston Bridge. (Repealed by Nene Valley Drainage and Navigation Improvement Act 1852 (15 & 16 Vict. c. cxxviii))
Somersetshire Coal Canal Act 1794	34 Geo. 3. c. 86	17 April 1794
An act for making and maintaining a navigable canal, with certain railways, and stone roads, from several collieries, in the county of Somerset, to communicate with the intended Kennet and Avon canal, in the parish of Bradford, in the county of Wilts.
Birmingham Canal Navigation Act 1794 (repealed)	34 Geo. 3. c. 87	17 April 1794
An act for extending and improving the Birmingham canal navigations. (Repealed by Birmingham Canal Navigations Act 1818 (58 Geo. 3. c. xix) and Birmingham Canal Navigations Act 1835 (5 & 6 Will. 4. c. xxxiv))
Saint Alkmond Church, Shrewsbury Act 1794	34 Geo. 3. c. 88	17 April 1794
An act for taking down and rebuilding the parish church of Saint Alkmond, in the town of Shrewsbury, in the county of Salop.
Abingdon Improvement Act 1794 (repealed)	34 Geo. 3. c. 89	17 April 1794
An act for paving the footways in the town of Abingdon, in the county of Berks; for better cleansing, lighting, and watching the streets, lanes, passages, and places, in the said town; for removing and preventing encroachments, obstructions, nuisances, and annoyances therein; and for otherwise improving the said town. (Repealed by Abingdon Improvement Act 1825 (6 Geo. 4. c. clxxxix))
Kennet and Avon Canal Act 1794	34 Geo. 3. c. 90	17 April 1794
An act for making a navigable canal from the river Kennet, at or near the town of Newbury, in the county of Berks, to the river Avon, at or near the city of Bath; and also certain navigable cuts therein described.
Borrowstoness Beer Duties Act 1794 (repealed)	34 Geo. 3. c. 91	9 May 1794
An act to continue the term and enlarge the powers of two acts, made in the seventeenth year of the reign of his late majesty King George the Second, (Note: Borrowstouness Beer Duties Act 1743 (17 Geo. 2. c. 21)) and the seventh year of the reign of his present Majesty, (Note: Borrowstouness Beer Duties Act 1766 (7 Geo. 3. c. 90)) for continuing the duty of two pennies Scots, or a sixth part of a penny sterling, upon every Scots pint of ale and beer, which shall be brewed for sale, brought into, tapped, or sold, within the town of Borrowstounness and liberties thereof, in the county of Linlithgow, and for extending the same over the parish of Borrowstounness; for repairing the harbour of the said town, and for other purposes therein mentioned. (Repealed by Borrowstouness Town and Harbour Act 1843 (6 & 7 Vict. c. lxix))
Wisbech Canal Act 1794	34 Geo. 3. c. 92	9 May 1794
An act for making and maintaining a navigable canal from Wisbeach river, at or near a place called the Old Sluice, in the town of Wisbeach, in the isle of Ely, and county of Cambridge, to join the river Nene, in the parish of Outwell, in the said isle of Ely, and in the county of Norfolk, and for improving and maintaining the navigation of the said river, from Outwell Church to Salter's Load Sluice.
Ashby de la Zouch Canal Act 1794	34 Geo. 3. c. 93	9 May 1794
An act for making and maintaining a navigable canal, from the Coventry canal, at or near Marston Bridge, in the parish of Bedworth, in the county of Warwick, to a certain close in the parish of Ashby de la Zouch, in the county of Leicester, and for continuing the same from thence, in one line, to the lime works at Ticknall, in the county of Derby, and in another line to the lime works at Cloudhill, in the said county of Leicester, with certain cuts or branches from the said canal.
Leeds and Liverpool Canal Act 1794	34 Geo. 3. c. 94	9 May 1794
An act to enable the company of proprietors of the canal navigation from Leeds to Liverpool, to complete the said navigation, and to vary the line thereof, and to raise a further sum of money for those purposes; and for making a navigable branch, therein described, from the intended new line of the said canal.
River Trent Navigation Act 1794 (repealed)	34 Geo. 3. c. 95	9 May 1794
An act to alter and amend an act of the twenty-third year of his present Majesty, (Note: Trent Navigation Act 1783 (23 Geo. 3. c. 41)) for improving the navigation of the river Trent; and for making and maintaining a navigable canal, from the said river, in the parish of Beeston, to join the Nottingham canal, in the parish of Lenton, in the county of Nottingham, and also certain cuts on the side of the said river. (Repealed by Trent Navigation Act 1858 (21 & 22 Vict. c. xxxiv))
Saint Pancras, etc. Improvement Act 1794 (repealed)	34 Geo. 3. c. 96	9 May 1794
An act for paving, cleansing, lighting, watching, watering, and otherwise improving and keeping in repair, the streets, squares, and other publick passages and places, which are and shall be made upon certain pieces of ground in the parishes of Saint Pancras, Saint George the Martyr, and Saint George, Bloomsbury, or some or one of them, in the county of Middlesex, belonging to the hospital for the maintenance and education of exposed and deserted young children, commonly called The Foundling Hospital. (Repealed by London Government (Borough of Holborn) Order in Council 1901 (SR&O 1901/269) and London Government (Borough of St. Pancras) Order in Council 1901 (SR&O 1901/274))
Stafford Shire Hall Act 1794 (repealed)	34 Geo. 3. c. 97	9 May 1794
An act for building a new Shire-hall for the county of Stafford. (Repealed by Stafford Shire Hall Act 1853 (16 & 17 Vict. c. lxxii))
Bedford Poor Relief Act 1794 (repealed)	34 Geo. 3. c. 98	9 May 1794
An act for the better relief, regulation and employment of the poor, within the town of Bedford, in the county of Bedford. (Repealed by Bedford Corporation Act 1964 (c. xxxiii))
Ayr Harbour Act 1794	34 Geo. 3. c. 99	9 May 1794
An act to continue the term, and enlarge the powers, of an act, made in the twelfth year of the reign of his present Majesty, intituled, "An act for deepening, cleaning, scouring, preserving, and maintaining, the harbour of Ayr; for enlarging and improving the quays and piers; for erecting docks, breasts, jettees, and piers; and for regulating ships, lighters, and other vessels, trading into and going out of the said harbour; and for other purposes therein mentioned." (Note: Ayr Harbour Act 1772 (12 Geo. 3. c. 22))
Forfar Roads Act 1794 (repealed)	34 Geo. 3. c. 100	9 May 1794
An act to continue the term, and enlarge the powers, of an act, made in the twenty-ninth year of the reign of his present Majesty, intituled, "An act for repairing the roads in the county of Forfar, and for regulating the statute labour within the same;" (Note: Forfar Roads Act 1789 (29 Geo. 3. c. 20)) and for repairing several other roads in the said county, and for building a bridge over the river Esk, near Finhaven. (Repealed by Roads and Bridges (Scotland) Act 1878 (41 & 42 Vict. c. 51) and Local Government (Scotland) Act 1889 (52 & 53 Vict. c. 50))
Crown Lands (Forfeited Estates) Act 1794 (repealed)	34 Geo. 3. c. 101	23 May 1794
An act to enable his Majesty to grant, in fee simple, certain estates vested in him, by reason of the attainders of the persons therein named, to the descendants of such attainted persons. (Repealed by Statute Law Revision Act 1948 (11 & 12 Geo. 6. c. 62))
Lincoln Drainage, etc. Act 1794	34 Geo. 3. c. 102	23 May 1794
An act for improving the outfall of the river Welland, in the county of Lincoln, and for the better drainage of the fen lands, low grounds, and marshes, discharging their waters through the same into the sea; and for altering and improving the navigation of the said river Welland, by means of a new cut, to commence below a certain place called The Reservoir, and to be carried from thence through the inclosed marshes, and open salt marshes, into Wyberton roads, between the port of Boston, and a place called The Scalp; and for disposing of the bare or white sands, adjoining to the said river; and for building a bridge over the said cut.
Coventry to Oxford Canal Act 1794 or the Oxford Canal Act 1794 (repealed)	34 Geo. 3. c. 103	23 May 1794
An act for amending and altering certain acts of parliament, for making and maintaining a navigable canal, from the Coventry canal navigation, to the city of Oxford. (Repealed by Oxford Canal Act 1808 (48 Geo. 3. c. iii) and Oxford Canal Navigation Act 1829 (10 Geo. 4. c. xlviii))
Cambridge Improvement Act 1794 (repealed)	34 Geo. 3. c. 104	23 May 1794
An act to amend and enlarge the powers of an act, passed in the twenty-eighth year of the reign of his present Majesty, intituled, "An act for the better paving, cleansing, and lighting the town of Cambridge, for removing and preventing obstructions and annoyances, and for widening the streets, lanes, and other passages, within the said town." (Note: Cambridge Improvement Act 1788 (28 Geo. 3. c. 64)) (Repealed by Local Government Board's Provisional Orders Confirmation (No. 15) Act 1889 (52 & 53 Vict. c. cxvi))
Bridgwater Navigation Act 1794 (repealed)	34 Geo. 3. c. 105	23 May 1794
An act for building a new bridge over the river Parrett, within the borough of Bridgewater, in the county of Somerset, and for repairing, maintaining, and extending the quays, in the port of Bridgewater aforesaid; for abolishing the ancient and accustomed duties, and for imposing certain new duties at the port of Bridgewater aforesaid, instead thereof; for regulating the moorings and stations of ships and vessels in the said port; and for imposing a certain toll on horses, carriages, and cattle. (Repealed by Bridgwater Navigation and Quays Act 1845 (8 & 9 Vict. c. lxxxix))
Abergavenny Improvement Act 1794 (repealed)	34 Geo. 3. c. 106	23 May 1794
An act for paving, and otherwise improving the town of Abergavenny, and limits thereof, in the county of Monmouth. (Repealed by Abergavenny Improvement Act 1854 (17 & 18 Vict. c. xlix))
Tipton Church, Stafford Act 1794	34 Geo. 3. c. 107	23 May 1794
An act for taking down and rebuilding the parish church of Tipton, (Note: St. Martin's Church, Tipton.) otherwise Tibbington, in the county of Stafford, and for enlarging the cemetery or burial ground belonging thereto.
Salt Marsh, Gloucester Stocking Act 1794 (repealed)	34 Geo. 3. c. 108	23 May 1794
An act for regulating the manner of stocking and using the Marsh Common, otherwise the Salt Marsh, in the parish of Almondsbury, in the county of Gloucester. (Repealed by Almondbury Inclosure Act 1815 (55 Geo. 3. c. 30 Pr.))
Swansea Canal Act 1794	34 Geo. 3. c. 109	23 May 1794
An act for making and maintaining a navigable canal from the town of Swansea, in the county of Glamorgan, into the parish of Yftradgunlais, in the county of Brecon.
Abergele and Rhydlan Drainage Act 1794 or the Rhuddlan Marsh Embankment Act 1794	34 Geo. 3. c. 110	11 June 1794
An act for embanking, and otherwise fencing from the sea, the lands on the sea coasts of the parish of Abergele, in the county of Denbigh, and Rhydlan Marsh, in the several parishes of Abergele aforesaid, and of Saint Asaph and Rhydlan, and the Franchise of Rhydlan, in the county of Flint, and sundry other marshes, commons, and waste lands, in the said parish of Rhydlan, and in the several parishes of Diferth, and Meliden, in the said county of Flint; and to cut and make in or through the same, or some part thereof, one or more aqueducts, or other watercourses and drains; and to inclose, divide, and sell, competent parts of the said several marshes, commons, and waste lands, to defray the expences of the said works, and to raise a fund for the future repair and preservation thereof.
Saint Stephen, Bristol Act 1794	34 Geo. 3. c. 111	11 June 1794
An act to enable the rector of the parish of Saint Stephen, in the city of Bristol, for the time being, and the feoffees of the lands, tenements, and hereditaments, belonging to the same parish, to sell, and re-convey to the mayor, burgesses, and commonalty, of the city of Bristol, a certain plot of ground, situate within and belonging to the said parish, and for applying the monies arising by such sale, and certain other monies, to the purposes of an act, passed in the fourteenth year of the reign of his present Majesty, (Note: Saint Stephen, Bristol Act 1774 (14 Geo. 3. c. 55)) for making commodious ways and passages within the parish of Saint Stephen, in the city of Bristol, and for enlarging the burying ground belonging to the said parish.
Dover Harbour Act 1794 (repealed)	34 Geo. 3. c. 112	11 June 1794
An act for better regulating the harbour of Dover, in the county of Kent. (Repealed by Dover Harbour Act 1828 (9 Geo. 4. c. xxxi) (Note: Incorrectly cited as "9 Geo. 4. c. lxxi" in the Chronological Table of the Statutes.))
St. Albans's Roads Act 1794 (repealed)	34 Geo. 3. c. 113	28 March 1794
An act to enable the trustees for the care of the road through the several parishes of Saint Michael, Saint Alban, Saint Peter, Shenley Ridge, and South Mims, in the counties of Hertford and Middlesex, to purchase certain buildings and hereditaments for the purpose of making a new road at the entrance into the town of Saint Alban. (Repealed by Pondyards and Chipping Barnet Road Act 1831 (1 & 2 Will. 4. c. lxxiv))
Norfolk Roads Act 1794 (repealed)	34 Geo. 3. c. 114	28 March 1794
An act for amending, widening, and keeping in repair the road from Norwich to Aylsham, in the county of Norfolk, and a certain part of the road leading from the said road towards Holt, in the said county. (Repealed by Norwich and Cromer Road Act 1831 (1 & 2 Will. 4. c. xiv))
Warwick Roads Act 1794 (repealed)	34 Geo. 3. c. 115	28 March 1794
An act to enlarge the term and powers of three acts, passed in the eighteenth year of the reign of his late majesty King George the Second, (Note: Warwickshire Roads Act 1744 (18 Geo. 2. c. 19)) and the tenth (Note: Warwick Roads (No. 2) Act 1770 (10 Geo. 3. c. 69)) and twenty-eighth (Note: Warwick Roads Act 1788 (28 Geo. 3. c. 107)) years of his present Majesty's reign, for repairing the road from Birmingham, in the county of Warwick, through Elmdon, to a lane leading by the end of Stone Bridge, in the said county. (Repealed by Birmingham and Stonebridge Road Act 1832 (2 & 3 Will. 4. c. xxxiii))
Warwick Roads (No. 2) Act 1794 (repealed)	34 Geo. 3. c. 116	28 March 1794
An act for enlarging the term and powers of an act, of the twelfth year of his present Majesty, (Note: Warwick Roads Act 1772 (12 Geo. 3. c. 91)) for repairing and widening the road from the Warwick road, near Solihul, to the guide post in Kenilworth, and from Stone Bridge, to meet the aforesaid Toad on Balsall Common, in the county of Warwick. (Repealed by Solihull, Kenilworth and Stonebridge Road Act 1814 (54 Geo. 3. c. xv) and Annual Turnpike Acts Continuance Act 1871 (34 & 35 Vict. c. 115))
Warwick Stafford and Worcester Roads Act 1794 (repealed)	34 Geo. 3. c. 117	28 March 1794
An act for enlarging the term and powers of certain acts of parliament, for repairing several roads in the counties of Warwick, Stafford, and Worcester, so far as relates to the Dudley district of the said roads; and for amending certain other roads in the county of Stafford. (Repealed by Dudley and Brettell Lane District of Roads Act 1832 (2 & 3 Will. 4. c. lxxxiv))
Thirsk Roads Act 1794 (repealed)	34 Geo. 3. c. 118	28 March 1794
An act for enlarging the term and powers of two acts, of the twenty-sixth year of King George the Second, (Note: Thirsk Roads Act 1753 (26 Geo. 2. c. 75)) and the eighteenth year of his present Majesty, (Note: Thirsk Roads Act 1778 (18 Geo. 3. c. 92)) for widening and repairing the high road leading from Northallerton to the Bush wall of the church yard of the town of Thirsk, and from the south-east end of the street called Finkell Street, in Thirsk, aforesaid, to and through the town of Easingwold, in the county of York, to a place called Burton Stone, near the city of York, and also the road from Thirsk aforesaid, to Topcliffe, in the north riding of the county of York. (Repealed by Roads from Northallerton and Thirsk Act 1808 (48 Geo. 3. c. vii) and Thirsk Turnpike Roads Act 1830 (11 Geo. 4 & 1 Will. 4. c. iv))
Hereford Roads Act 1794 (repealed)	34 Geo. 3. c. 119	28 March 1794
An act for enlarging the term and powers of two acts, of the twenty-ninth year of King George the Second, (Note: Hereford Roads Act 1756 (29 Geo. 2. c. 65)) and the thirteenth year of his present Majesty, (Note: Hereford Roads Act 1773 (13 Geo. 3. c. 95)) for repairing and widening several roads leading from the town of Kington, in the county of Hereford, and other roads within the said county; and also for making, amending, widening, and keeping in repair, certain other roads within the said county, adjoining or lying near to the roads comprized in the said acts. (Repealed by Kington Roads (Herefordshire) Act 1842 (5 & 6 Vict. c. lxxvii))
Roads from Ticknall Act 1794 (repealed)	34 Geo. 3. c. 120	4 April 1794
An act for amending and repairing the roads from a place called Scaddow Gate, in the parish of Ticknall, to the Burton upon Trent and Ashby de la Zouch turnpike road, at or near a place called The Wooden Box, and certain other roads therein mentioned, in the counties of Derby and Leicester. (Repealed by Roads from Ticknall (Derbyshire, Leicestershire) Act 1834 (4 & 5 Will. 4. c. lx))
Harrogate to Ripon Road Act 1794 (repealed)	34 Geo. 3. c. 121	4 April 1794
An act for enlarging the term and powers of three several acts, passed in the twenty-fifth (Note: Yorkshire Roads (No. 3) Act 1751 (25 Geo. 2. c. 58)) and twenty-ninth (Note: Yorkshire Roads Act 1756 (29 Geo. 2. c. 71)) years of the reign of his late majesty King George the Second, and the seventeenth year of the reign of his present Majesty, (Note: Yorks Roads (No. 2) Act 1777 (17 Geo. 3. c. 77)) so far as the same relate to the amending and widening of the road from Harrowgate, through Ripley and Ripon, to the north-east corner of Hutton Moor, and from the east end of Kirby Hill Moor, to the town of Ripon aforesaid. (Repealed by Harrogate and Hutton Moor and Kirkby Hill Moor and Ripon Roads Act 1814 (54 Geo. 3. c. cci))
Salop and Hereford Roads Act 1794 (repealed)	34 Geo. 3. c. 122	4 April 1794
An act for enlarging the term and powers of certain acts of parliament, for repairing the road leading from the town of Ludlow, in the county of Salop, through Woofferton and Little Hereford, to a place called Monk's Bridge, in the said county; and also, from the said town of Ludlow, to a place or house called The Maidenheads, at Orleton, in the county of Hereford. (Repealed by Road from Ludlow to Monk's Bridge Act 1820 (1 Geo. 4. c. xxxiv))
Salop Roads Act 1794 (repealed)	34 Geo. 3. c. 123	4 April 1794
An act for enlarging the term and powers of certain acts of parliament for amending, widening, and keeping in repair several roads leading from the market house, and elsewhere, in the town of Ludlow, in the county of Salop, and also the road leading from the turnpike or side gate, in the parish of Ashford Bowdler, to the turnpike road on the Clee Hill, in the said county; and for, amending, widening, and keeping in repair, the road from The Craven Arms, in the parish of Stanton Lacy, to Bowden, in the said county. (Repealed by Ludlow Roads Act 1820 (1 Geo. 4. c. xxxiii))
Rochdale to Bury Road Act 1794 (repealed)	34 Geo. 3. c. 124	4 April 1794
An act for amending, widening, altering, diverting, and improving, the road leading from the town of Rochdale, to a place called Edenfield, in the parish of Bury, all in the county palatine of Lancaster. (Repealed by Rochdale and Edenfield Road Act 1813 (53 Geo. 3. c. cxxxiv) and Rochdale and Edenfield Road Act 1833 (3 & 4 Will. 4. c. lxxxiv))
Burtry Ford to Burnstone Road Act 1794 (repealed)	34 Geo. 3. c. 125	17 April 1794
An act for altering, repairing, and widening the road, from Burtry Ford, in the county of Durham, to Alston, in the county of Cumberland, and from Alston aforesaid, by the dyke, to Burnstones, in the county of Northumberland. (Repealed by Durham, Cumberland, Northumberland and North Yorkshire Roads and Tyne Bridges Act 1824 (5 Geo. 4. c. xxxiv))
Northampton Roads Act 1794 (repealed)	34 Geo. 3. c. 126	17 April 1794
An act for repairing and widening the road leading from Saint Martin Stamford Baron to Kettering, and from Oundle to Middleton Lane, in the parish or hamlet of Middleton, in the county of Northampton. (Repealed by Stamford and Kettering, and Oundle and Middleton Lane Turnpike Roads Act 1854 (17 & 18 Vict. c. cix))
Isle of Ely to Ramsey Road Act 1794	34 Geo. 3. c. 127	17 April 1794
An act for continuing the term of so much of an act of the twelfth year of his present Majesty, (Note: Drainage (Cambridge, Isle of Ely) Act 1772 (12 Geo. 3. c. 26)) as relates to the road from Carter's Bridge, in the parish of Chatteris, within the Isle of Ely, in the county of Cambridge, to The Forty Feet Bridge, in the parish of Ramsey, in the county of Huntingdon.
Dunchurch to Southam Road Act 1794 (repealed)	34 Geo. 3. c. 128	17 April 1794
An act for amending, widening, altering, and keeping in repair, the road from Dunchurch to Southam, in the county of Warwick. (Repealed by Road from Dunchurch to Southam Act 1815 (55 Geo. 3. c. xi) and Annual Turnpike Acts Continuance Act 1875 (38 & 39 Vict. c. cxciv))
Stirling Dumbarton and Perth Roads Act 1794 (repealed)	34 Geo. 3. c. 129	17 April 1794
An act for repairing the road from Stirling to Dumbarton, and several other roads in the counties of Stirling, Dumbarton, and Perth. (Repealed by Stirling, Dumbarton and Perth Roads Act 1815 (55 Geo. 3. c. xxxiv) and Roads and Bridges in Dumbarton and Stirling Act 1834 (4 & 5 Will. 4. c. lxi))
Newcastle to Buckton Burn Road Act 1794 (repealed)	34 Geo. 3. c. 130	17 April 1794
An act for enlarging the terms and powers of two acts, made in the twentieth (Note: Northumberland Roads Act 1746 (20 Geo. 2. c. 9)) and thirtieth (Note: Northumberland Roads Act 1757 (30 Geo. 2. c. 52)) years of the reign of his late majesty King George the Second, for repairing the high road leading from the north end of the cow cawsey near the town of Newcastle upon Tyne, to the town of Belford, and from thence to Buckton Burn, in the county of Northumberland. (Repealed by Road from Cow-Cawsey to Buckton Burn Act 1815 (55 Geo. 3. c. xxxiii))
Middlesex Roads Act 1794 (repealed)	34 Geo. 3. c. 131	9 May 1794
An act to continue the term, and enlarge the powers, of several acts of parliament, for repairing the highways between Tyburn and Uxbridge, in the county of Middlesex, and for amending the road leading from Brent Bridge, over Hanwell Heathy through the parishes of Hanwell, New Brentford, and Ealing, to the great western road in the said county, and for lighting, watching, and watering the highway between Tyburn and Kensington Gravel Pits. (Repealed by Roads between Tyburn and Uxbridge Act 1826 (7 Geo. 4. c. lxxvi))
Berkshire Roads Act 1794 (repealed)	34 Geo. 3. c. 132	9 May 1794
An act for enlarging the term and powers of an act of the eleventh year of his present Majesty, (Note: Berkshire Roads Act 1771 (11 Geo. 3. c. 70)) for repairing the road between The Bear Inn, (Note: The Black Bear Inn stood at the corner of Castle Street and Bridge Street in Reading. 51°27′13″N 0°58′26″W) in Reading, and Puntfield, (Note: Puntfield was located near the Spring Inn, on the A4 at the junction with Sulhamstead Hill, west of Theale. 51°25′21″N 1°06′20″W) in the county of Berks, and several other roads in the said county. (Repealed by Speenhamland and Puntfield Road Act 1815 (55 Geo. 3. c. xcv), Ruscombe, Reading and Beenham Road Act 1826 (7 Geo. 4. c. lxxiii) and Annual Turnpike Acts Continuance Act 1876 (39 & 40 Vict. c. 39))
Wolverhampton Roads Act 1794	34 Geo. 3. c. 133	23 May 1794
An act for amending, widening, altering, improving, and keeping in repair, the road from Wolverhampton, in the county of Stafford, to Ivetsey Bank, in the parish of Blimhill, in the said county.
Yorkshire Roads Act 1794 (repealed)	34 Geo. 3. c. 134	23 May 1794
An act for continuing the term and altering and enlarging the powers, of several acts of parliament therein mentioned, so far as the same relate to the repairing and amending of the roads leading from Leeds, through Bradford and Horton, and through Bowling and Wibsey, to Halifax, and also the roads called Bowling Lane and Little Horton Lane, in the west riding of the county of York. (Repealed by Leeds and Halifax Turnpike Roads and Branches Act 1825 (6 Geo. 4. c. cxlix))
Gloucester and Worcester Roads Act 1794 (repealed)	34 Geo. 3. c. 135	23 May 1794
An act for more effectually amending, widening, and keeping in repair the roads leading from the town of Tewkesbury, in the county of Gloucester, to the several places therein mentioned, being the first district of roads described in two acts of parliament, passed in the twenty-ninth year of the reign of his late majesty King George the Second, (Note: Gloucestershire Roads Act 1756 (29 Geo. 2. c. 51)) and the fourth year of the reign of his present Majesty, (Note: Gloucester and Worcester Roads Act 1764 (4 Geo. 3. c. 79)) and for altering the course of part of the said roads; and also for making, and keeping in repair a road from Simmond's Ford Brook to the turnpike road leading to Evesham, in the county of Worcester, at or near Beckford Inn, in the said county of Gloucester, and from Gotherington to the turnpike road leading from Cheltenham to Stow on the Wold, at or near Sireford Inn, in the said county of Gloucester, and from Stump Cross, in the parish of Didbrook, to the town of Stow on the Wold, in the county of Gloucester aforesaid. (Repealed by Tewkesbury Roads Act 1818 (58 Geo. 3. c. xxx) and Didbrook and Stow-on-the-Wold Road Act 1819 (59 Geo. 3. c. cxxiv))
Worcester and Warwick Roads Act 1794 (repealed)	34 Geo. 3. c. 136	23 May 1794
An act for enlarging the term and powers of certain acts of parliament for repairing several roads in the counties of Worcester and Warwick, so far as relates to the road leading from the town of Bromsgrove to the town of Dudley, in the county of Worcester, and for making a more commodious road near the town of Dudley. (Repealed by Road from Bromsgrove to Dudley Act 1816 (56 Geo. 3. c. lxvii) and Dudley, Halesowen and Bromsgrove Road Act 1854 (17 & 18 Vict. c. cv))
Chelmsford Roads Act 1794 (repealed)	34 Geo. 3. c. 137	23 May 1794
An act for repairing and widening the road from a place called Black Grove, in the parish of Rawreth, over Battle's Bridge, to the town of Chelmsford, in the county of Essex. (Repealed by Statute Law (Repeals) Act 2008 (c. 12))
Stirling Roads Act 1794 (repealed)	34 Geo. 3. c. 138	23 May 1794
An act for making and repairing several roads leading across the county of Stirling. (Repealed by Roads in Stirling Act 1831 (1 & 2 Will. 4. c. xxxviii))
Clackmannan and Perth Roads Act 1794 (repealed)	34 Geo. 3. c. 139	23 May 1794
An act for making and repairing certain roads in the counties of Clackmanan and Perth. (Repealed by Roads in Clackmannan and Perth Act 1813 (53 Geo. 3. c. xlvi) and Clackmannan and Perth Roads Act 1840 (3 & 4 Vict. c. xl))
Glasgow and Renfrew Roads Act 1794 (repealed)	34 Geo. 3. c. 140	23 May 1794
An act for enlarging the term and powers of an act, made in the fourteenth year of the reign of his present Majesty, (Note: Glasgow Roads (No. 2) Act 1774 (14 Geo. 3. c. 105)) intituled, "An act to continue the terms of two acts, made in the twenty-sixth (Note: Glasgow Roads Act 1753 (26 Geo. 2. c. 90)) and twenty-seventh (Note: Glasgow Roads Act 1754 (27 Geo. 2. c. 27)) years of the reign of his late majesty King George the Second, for repairing several roads leading into the city of Glasgow, so far as the same relate to the roads from the city of Glasgow to Yoker Bridge, to Renfrew Bridge, to The Three Mile House, to the town of Airdrie, and from the village of Gorballs to the chapel of Cambuslang, in the counties of Lanerk and Renfrew," so far as respects the road from the toll house in Paisley Lane, at the west side of the entry to the new bridge of Glasgow, by or near Parkhouse, to the east end of the bridge at Renfrew, and from Parkhouse to The Three Mile House in the county of Lanerk; and for more effectually making, repairing, widening, and keeping in repair, the said roads. (Repealed by Glasgow and Renfrew Road Act 1839 (2 & 3 Vict. c. l) and Glasgow and Lanark Road Act 1843 (6 & 7 Vict. c. xxxix))
Berkshire and Southampton Roads Act 1794 (repealed)	34 Geo. 3. c. 141	11 June 1794
An act to continue the term, and alter and enlarge the powers, of an act, passed in the twelfth year of the reign of his present Majesty, (Note: Berkshire and Southampton Roads Act 1772 (12 Geo. 3. c. 78)) for repairing and widening several roads from Aldermaston, in the county of Berks, to Basingstoke, and from Aldermaston aforesaid to the turnpike road from Basingstoke to Andover, at or near Worting, and to the turnpike road leading to Winchester, at Popham Lane, in the county of Southampton. (Repealed by Aldermaston and Basingstoke Road Act 1816 (56 Geo. 3. c. xlvii) and Annual Turnpike Acts Continuance Act 1875 (38 & 39 Vict. c. cxciv))
Beaconsfield and Stokenchurch Road Act 1794 (repealed)	34 Geo. 3. c. 142	11 June 1794
An act to continue the term, and to reduce into one act the powers, of four several acts passed, in the fifth year of the reign of his late majesty King George the First, (Note: Beaconsfield and Stokenchurch Road Act 1718 (5 Geo. 1. c. 2 Pr.)) and in the ninth (Note: Beaconsfield and Stokenchurch Road Act 1735 (9 Geo. 2. c. 11)) and thirty-third (Note: Beaconsfield and Stokenchurch Road Act 1759 (33 Geo. 2. c. 37)) years of the reign of his late majesty King George the Second, and in the fifteenth year of the reign of his present Majesty, (Note: Beaconsfield and Stokenchurch Road Act 1775 (15 Geo. 3. c. 70)) for repairing the road from Beaconsfield, in the county of Buckingham, to Stokenchurch, in the county of Oxford. (Repealed by Beaconsfield and Stokenchurch Road Act 1823 (4 Geo. 4. c. cviii))
Cumberland Roads Act 1794 (repealed)	34 Geo. 3. c. 143	11 June 1794
An act for amending, and keeping in repair, the road leading from Lyne Bridge, through Longtown, to the Scotch Dyke, and from Longtown to the bridge over the river of Sark, in the county of Cumberland. (Repealed by Longtown Roads (Cumberland) Act 1830 (11 Geo. 4 & 1 Will. 4. c. ix))

=== Private and personal acts ===
Short title	Citation	Royal assent
Long title
Persent's Naturalization Act 1794	34 Geo. 3. c. 1 Pr.	20 February 1794
An act for naturalizing Martin Walther Persent.
Bodecker's Naturalization Act 1794	34 Geo. 3. c. 2 Pr.	20 February 1794
An act for naturalizing Augustus William Bòdecker.
Warter Inclosure Act 1794	34 Geo. 3. c. 3 Pr.	1 March 1794
An act for inclosing and otherwise improving certain lands and grounds within the lordship and township of Warter, in the east riding of the county of York.
Hullman and Rudolf's Naturalization Act 1794	34 Geo. 3. c. 4 Pr.	1 March 1794
An act for naturalizing Gerard Hullman and William Rudolf.
Heintz's Naturalization Act 1794	34 Geo. 3. c. 5 Pr.	1 March 1794
An act for naturalizing Elias Heintz.
Benjoin's Naturalization Act 1794	34 Geo. 3. c. 6 Pr.	1 March 1794
An act for naturalizing George Benjoin.
Shelton Inclosure Act 1794	34 Geo. 3. c. 7 Pr.	28 March 1794
An act for dividing and inclosing the common and open fields, meadows, commonable lands, and waste grounds, within the parish of Shelton, in the county of Bedford.
Little Dunham Inclosure Act 1794	34 Geo. 3. c. 8 Pr.	28 March 1794
An act for dividing, allotting, and inclosing, the whole year lands, half year or shack lands, commons, and waste grounds, within the parish of Little Dunham, in the county of Norfolk.
Chapple Allerton, &c. Inclosure Act 1794	34 Geo. 3. c. 9 Pr.	28 March 1794
An act for dividing, allotting, and inclosing, certain moors, commons, and waste lands, lying and being within the parishes of Chapple Allerton, Biddisham, and Wear, in the county of Somerset.
Shilton Inclosure Act 1794	34 Geo. 3. c. 10 Pr.	28 March 1794
An act for dividing, allotting, and inclosing certain common fields, downs, and commonable lands, in the manor and parish of Shilton, in the county of Berks.
Clayton-le-Moors Inclosure Act 1794	34 Geo. 3. c. 11 Pr.	28 March 1794
An act for dividing and inclosing the common and waste grounds, within the manor or township of Clayton-le-Moors, within the parish of Whalley, in the hundred of Blackburn, in the county palatine of Lancaster.
Pilton and North Wotton Inclosure Act 1794	34 Geo. 3. c. 12 Pr.	28 March 1794
An act for dividing, allotting, and inclosing certain moors, commons, and waste lands, lying and being in the parishes of Pilton and North Wotton, in the county of Somerset.
Preston and Sutton Pointz Inclosure Act 1794	34 Geo. 3. c. 13 Pr.	28 March 1794
An act for dividing and inclosing the open common fields, common downs, commons, marches, and waste lands, within the manors of Preston and Sutton Pointz, in the county of Dorset; and for extinguishing all right of common upon certain inclosed lands within the said manors.
Little Compton Inclosure Act 1794	34 Geo. 3. c. 14 Pr.	28 March 1794
An act for dividing and inclosing the open and common fields, and other commonable lands and grounds, within the parish of Little Compton, in the county of Gloucester.
East Mark Inclosure Act 1794	34 Geo. 3. c. 15 Pr.	28 March 1794
An act for dividing, allotting, and inclosing, certain moors, commons, or waste lands, called Little Mark Moor and Summer Leaze, and all the other open, common, or waste lands, in the manor of East Mark, within the parish of Mark, in the county of Somerset.
Bergne's Naturalization Act 1794	34 Geo. 3. c. 16 Pr.	28 March 1794
An act for naturalizing John Bergne.
Tolkien's Naturalization Act 1794	34 Geo. 3. c. 17 Pr.	28 March 1794
An act for naturalizing Daniel Tolkien.
Brunswick's Naturalization Act 1794	34 Geo. 3. c. 18 Pr.	28 March 1794
An act for naturalizing Christopher Brunswick.
Zobell's Naturalization Act 1794	34 Geo. 3. c. 19 Pr.	28 March 1794
An act for naturalizing Hieronimus Heihrich Zobell, commonly called Hieronimus Henry Zobell.
Maze's Naturalization Act 1794	34 Geo. 3. c. 20 Pr.	28 March 1794
An act for naturalizing James Maze.
Harrison's Estate Act 1794	34 Geo. 3. c. 21 Pr.	4 April 1794
An act for vesting the estate at Little Woodhouse, in the county of York, devised by the will of Jeremiah Harrison gentleman, deceased, in trustees, to sell the same, and apply the money to arise by such sale in the purchase of other lands or hereditaments, to be settled in lieu thereof.
Winwick Inclosure Act 1794	34 Geo. 3. c. 22 Pr.	4 April 1794
An act for dividing and inclosing the common and open fields, meadows, commonable lands, and waste grounds, in Winwick, in the counties of Huntingdon and Northampton.
Rilliet's Naturalization Act 1794	34 Geo. 3. c. 23 Pr.	4 April 1794
An act for naturalizing Peter Rilliet.
Dean and Canons of Windsor and Mr. Stoner's Exchange Act 1794	34 Geo. 3. c. 24 Pr.	17 April 1794
An act for effectuating an exchange between the dean and canons of Windsor and Thomas Stoner esquire.
Western's Estate Act 1794	34 Geo. 3. c. 25 Pr.	17 April 1794
An act for vesting the settled estate of Thomas Walsingham Western clerk, in the county of Sussex, in him and his heirs, and for settling an estate of greater value in the county of Essex in lieu thereof, and in exchange for the same.
Peachey's Estate Act 1794	34 Geo. 3. c. 26 Pr.	17 April 1794
An act for vesting the estates devised by the will of James Peachey esquire, in the county of Hereford, in trustees, to sell or exchange the same, and for laying out the money, arising by such sale or exchange, in the purchase of other hereditaments, to be settled to the uses of the said will.
Foxley Charity Act 1794	34 Geo. 3. c. 27 Pr.	17 April 1794
An act for amending an act, passed in the twelfth year of the reign of his present Majesty, intituled, "An act for establishing and regulating a charity, called Foxley Charity, in the county of Northampton, founded by lady Katherine Leveson." (Note: Foxley Charity (Northamptonshire) Act 1772 (12 Geo. 3. c. 12 Pr.))
Longborough Inclosure Act 1794	34 Geo. 3. c. 28 Pr.	17 April 1794
An act for dividing and inclosing the open fields, common meadows, and pastures, commonable and waste lands, within the manor and parish of Longborough, in the county of Gloucester.
Tuddenham Inclosure Act 1794	34 Geo. 3. c. 29 Pr.	17 April 1794
An act for dividing and inclosing the common fields, half year lands, lammas meadows, heaths, fen lands, commons, and waste lands, within the parish of Tuddenham, in the county of Suffolk.
Empingham Inclosure Act 1794	34 Geo. 3. c. 30 Pr.	17 April 1794
An act for dividing, allotting, and inclosing, certain open and common fields, meadows, common pastures, commonable heath grounds, and waste lands, within the manor or lordship, and parish, of Empingham, in the county of Rutland.
East Harptry Inclosure Act 1794	34 Geo. 3. c. 31 Pr.	17 April 1794
An act for dividing, allotting, and inclosing, a tract of common or waste land, part of the forest of Mendip, lying within the manor and parish of East Harptry, in the county of Somerset.
Keevil, Idmaston, &c. Inclosure Act 1794	34 Geo. 3. c. 32 Pr.	17 April 1794
An act for dividing and allotting the open and common fields, open downs, common meadows, common pastures, and waste lands, within the several manors of Keevil, Idmaston, Fittleton, and Chisenbury de la Folly, in the county of Wilts.
East Brent Inclosure Act 1794	34 Geo. 3. c. 33 Pr.	17 April 1794
An act for dividing, inclosing, and allotting, certain moors, commons, or waste lands, lying and being within the manor and parish of East Brent, in the county oi Somerset.
Quarley Inclosure Act 1794	34 Geo. 3. c. 34 Pr.	17 April 1794
An act for dividing, allotting, and inclosing, the common fields. Common downs, waste lands, and other commonable places, within the parish of Quarley, in the county of Southampton.
Tintinhull Inclosure Act 1794	34 Geo. 3. c. 35 Pr.	17 April 1794
An act for dividing, allotting, and inclosing, certain open and common arable fields, and a common meadow, within the manor and parish of Tintinhull, in the county of Somerset.
Crawcrook Inclosure Act 1794	34 Geo. 3. c. 36 Pr.	17 April 1794
An Act for dividing and inclosing certain Open and Common Town Fields within the Manor and Township of Crawcrook, in the Parish of Ryton, in the County Palatine of Durham.
Diseworth Inclosure Act 1794	34 Geo. 3. c. 37 Pr.	17 April 1794
An Act for dividing and inclosing the Open Fields, Meadows, Common Pastures, and Common Grounds, within the Lordship or Liberty of Discworth, in the County of Leicester.
Hoyland Inclosure Act 1794	34 Geo. 3. c. 38 Pr.	17 April 1794
An Act for dividing, allotting, and inclosing, the Open Common Fields, Commons, and Waste Grounds, within the Township of Hoyland, in the Parish of Wath upon Dern, in the West Riding of the County of York.
Chester-le-Street Inclosure Act 1794	34 Geo. 3. c. 39 Pr.	17 April 1794
An Act for dividing and inclosing certain Moors, Commons, or Tracts of Waste Land, within the Parish and Manor of Chester in the County Palatine of Durham.
Long Bennington and Foston Inclosure Act 1794	34 Geo. 3. c. 40 Pr.	17 April 1794
An act for dividing, allotting, and inclosing, the open fields, meadows, pastures, commonable lands, and waste grounds, within the parishes of Long Bennington and Foston, in the county of Lincoln.
Claife Inclosure Act 1794	34 Geo. 3. c. 41 Pr.	17 April 1794
An Act for dividing, allotting, and inclosing, the Commons or Waste Lands, called Claife Heights, or Claife Commons, except a certain Plot of Land, called The Heald, within the Township or Division of Claife, in the Parish of Hawkshead, in the County Palatine of Lancaster.
Queen Camell Inclosure Act 1794	34 Geo. 3. c. 42 Pr.	17 April 1794
An Act for dividing, allotting, and inclosing, the several Open and Common Fields, Common Meadows, a Stinted Pasture, and other Commonable Lands and Grounds, in the Parish of East Camell, otherwise Queen Camell, in the County of Somerset.
Wendover Inclosure Act 1794	34 Geo. 3. c. 43 Pr.	17 April 1794
An Act for dividing and inclosing the Open Common Fields, Common Meadows, and Waste Lands and Grounds, within the Manor and Parish of Wendover, in the County of Buckingham.
Skelton Inclosure Act 1794	34 Geo. 3. c. 44 Pr.	17 April 1794
An Act for dividing and inclosing the Open Common Fields, Ings, Moors, Commons, and Waste Grounds, within the Township of Skelton, in the Canon, Fee, Manor, and Parish of Ripon, in the West Riding of the County of York.
Shuckburgh's Name Act 1794	34 Geo. 3. c. 45 Pr.	17 April 1794
An act to enable Sir George Augustus William Shuckburgh, Baronet, to take, use, and bear, the Surname and Arms of Evelyn.
Webster's Estate Act 1794	34 Geo. 3. c. 46 Pr.	9 May 1794
An Act to enable Mary Webster, Widow, and others, to grant Building and Repairing Leases of the Estates devised to them by Edward Webster, Esquire, in the Parish of Saint John, Southwark, in the County of Surrey.
Old Malton Inclosure Act 1794	34 Geo. 3. c. 47 Pr.	9 May 1794
An Act for dividing, inclosing, draining, and improving, the Open Fields, Ings, Pastures, Commons, and Waste Grounds within the Manor and Parish of Old Malton, in the North Riding of the County of York.
Burford Inclosure Act 1794	34 Geo. 3. c. 48 Pr.	9 May 1794
An Act for dividing and inclosing the Open and Common Fields, Common Meadows, Common Pastures, and other Commonable Lands, in the Parish of Burford, in the County of Oxford.
South Kelsey Inclosure Act 1794	34 Geo. 3. c. 49 Pr.	9 May 1794
An Act for dividing, allotting, and inclosing, the Open and Common Fields, Carr Lands, Furze Leas, Waste Lands, and other Lands, in the Parishes of Saint Mary South Kelsey, and Saint Nicholas South Kelsey, within the Manor or Lordship of South Kelsey, in the County of Lincoln, and for extinguishing all Rights of Common and Sheep Walks in and over the same.
Thornham Inclosure Act 1794	34 Geo. 3. c. 50 Pr.	9 May 1794
An act for dividing, allotting, exchanging, and inclosing, the whole year lands, open field lands, commonable marshes, commons, and waste lands, within the parish of Thornham, in the county of Norfolk.
Tibthorpe Inclosure Act 1794	34 Geo. 3. c. 51 Pr.	9 May 1794
An Act for dividing and inclosing the Open Fields, Pastures, Commons, and Wastes, within the Township of Tibthorpe, in the Parish of Kirkbourn, in the East Riding of the County of York, and for making a Compensation in Lieu of the Tythes thereof, and of the ancient inclosed Lands in the same Township.
Marden Inclosure Act 1794	34 Geo. 3. c. 52 Pr.	9 May 1794
An Act for dividing, allotting, and laying in Severalty, the Open and Common Fields and Downs, Commonable Meadows, and other Open and Commonable Lands and Grounds, within the several Tythings of Roundway, Bedborough, Chittoe, and Bishop's Cannings, and in the Parish of Marden, in the County of Wilts.
Walkington Inclosure Act 1794	34 Geo. 3. c. 53 Pr.	9 May 1794
An Act for dividing and inclosing the Open and Common Fields, Meadows, and Pastures, or Commons, within the Township of Walkington, in the East Riding of the County of York.
Broughton Inclosure Act 1794	34 Geo. 3. c. 54 Pr.	9 May 1794
An Act for dividing and inclosing the Common and Open Fields, Meadows, Commonable Lands and Waste Grounds, in the Parish of Broughton, in the County of Huntingdon.
Brereton's Name Act 1794	34 Geo. 3. c. 55 Pr.	9 May 1794
An act to enable Thomas Brereton esquire, and Mary his wife, and her first and other sons and their issue male, and her daughter, if she shall have only one, and the issue of such daughter, to take, use, and bear, the name and arms of Westfaling, pursuant to the will of Herbert Westfaling esquire, deceased.
Bishop of Peterborough's and Ash's Estate Act 1794	34 Geo. 3. c. 56 Pr.	23 May 1794
An Act to confirm and establish an Award made between the Right Reverend Father in God Spencer Lord Bishop of Peterborough, and the Coheirs of William Ash, Esquire, deceased, and other Persons entitled to, and interested in, the several Freehold, Leasehold, and Copyhold Estates, late of the said William Ash, situate and being in Paston, Gunthorpe, and Peterborough, in the County of Northampton (the Leasehold Parts whereof are Parts of the Possessions of or belonging to the See of Peterborough, and the Copyhold Parts thereof are held of Manors also belonging to the same See) in order to divide, ascertain, and determine the respective Parts of the said Estates, and the Boundaries thereof, and to distinguish the Leasehold and Copyhold from the Freehold Parts of the same Estates, late of the said William Ash, deceased.
Bishop of Bristol and Gott's, &c. Agreement Act 1794	34 Geo. 3. c. 57 Pr.	23 May 1794
An Act to carry into Execution certain Articles of Agreement entered into between Christopher late Lord Bishop of Bristol, and Messieurs Benjamin Gott and Harry Wormald, and also to enable the Devisees in the Will of the said late Lord Bishop to renew Building Leases of Parts of his Estate, in the Parish of Leeds, in the County of York, in Performance of Covenants contained in such Leases, and to grant Building Leases of other Parts of the same Estate, with like Covenants for Renewal.
Willson's Estate Act 1794	34 Geo. 3. c. 58 Pr.	23 May 1794
An Act for vesting Part of the settled Estate of William Willson, Esquire, and Bridget his Wife, in Trustees, to be conveyed to John Lambton, Esquire, on Payment of the Sum of Three thousand One hundred and Forty-two Pounds Seventeen Shillings and Two Pence, and for laying out the same Sum in the Purchase of other Lands and Hereditaments, to be settled in Lieu thereof.
Brocas's Estate Act 1794	34 Geo. 3. c. 59 Pr.	23 May 1794
An Act for allowing Timber to be cut upon certain Estates settled by the Will of Bernard Brocas, Esquire, and for applying and laying out the Money to arise therefrom in the Purchase of other Estates, to be settled to the same Uses.
Emanuel Hospital Act 1794	34 Geo. 3. c. 60 Pr.	23 May 1794
An act to empower the lord mayor and aldermen of the city oi London, governors of Emanuel Hospital, in or near Westminster, to extend and increase the objects of that charity.
Biscoe's Estates Act 1794	34 Geo. 3. c. 61 Pr.	23 May 1794
Ah act for empowering trustees to convey to sir Joseph Bants baronet, a part of the settled estates oi Elisha Biscoe esquire, pursuant to his contract for the purchase thereof, and to sell or exchange other parts of the said settled estates, and to lay out the money arising from the sales in the purchase of other lands, to be settled, as well as those taken in exchange, to the uses of the estates that shall be so sold or exchanged.
Brasen Nose College and Loveden's Exchange Act 1794	34 Geo. 3. c. 62 Pr.	23 May 1794
An act for establishing and confirming certain articles of agreement for an exchange between the principal and scholars of the King's Hall and college of Brazen Nose, in Oxford, and Edward Loveden Loveden, of Buscot Park, in the county of Berks esquire.
Arnold's Estate Act 1794	34 Geo. 3. c. 63 Pr.	23 May 1794
An act to enable trustees to sell and dispose of certain leasehold messuages and premises, situate in the parish of Saint Ann Westminster, devised by the will of Lumley Arnold esquire, deceased, and for laying out the monies to arise thereby in the purchase of freehold lands and hereditaments, to be settled, as nearly as may be, upon the same trusts as by the said will are declared of and concerning the said leasehold premises.
St. John's Estate Act 1794	34 Geo. 3. c. 64 Pr.	23 May 1794
An act to enable Saint Andrew Saint John esquire, and, after his death, other persons, to grant leases of his estate in the parish of Saint John Wapping, in the county of Middlesex.
St. Nicholas and St. Mary, South Kelsey Parish Unification Act 1794	34 Geo. 3. c. 65 Pr.	23 May 1794
An act for uniting the rectory and parish church of Saint Nicholas South Kelsey, in the county of Lincoln, with the adjoining rectory and parish church of Saint Mary South Kelsey, from and after the next avoidance of either benefice.
Mayes Charity Lands Act 1794	34 Geo. 3. c. 66 Pr.	23 May 1794
An act to enable the trustees of certain lands in Manchester, in the county of Lancaster, called Mayes Charity Lands, to convey in fee or grant leases under reserved yearly rents.
Honywood's Estate Act 1794	34 Geo. 3. c. 67 Pr.	23 May 1794
An act for vesting part of the settled estates of sir John Honywood baronet, in trustees, to be sold or exchanged, and for applying part of the money arising by sale in discharging mortgages on other parts of the settled estates, and for laying out the residue in the purchase of other estates, to be settled to the same uses.
Howard's Divorce Act 1794	34 Geo. 3. c. 68 Pr.	23 May 1794
An act to dissolve the marriage of Bernard Edward Howard esquire, with the right honourable lady Elizabeth Belafyle, his now wife, and to enable him to marry again, and for other purposes therein mentioned.
Elloughton Inclosure Act 1794	34 Geo. 3. c. 69 Pr.	23 May 1794
An act for dividing and inclosing the open and uninclosed fields, arable, meadow, and pasture lands, commons, or waste grounds, within the several townships of Elloughton, Brought and Waldby, in the parish of Elloughton, in the east riding of the county of York.
Sodbury Common Fields Inclosure Act 1794	34 Geo. 3. c. 70 Pr.	23 May 1794
An act for confirming and establishing the division, allotment, and inclosure, of certain open or common fields and common field lands, and a common lot mead, within the manors and parishes of Old Sodbury and Little Sodbury, in the county of Gloucester.
Compton Beauchamp Inclosure Act 1794	34 Geo. 3. c. 71 Pr.	23 May 1794
An Act for dividing and allotting the several Open Common Fields, Commons Downs, Wastes, and other Commonable Lands and Grounds, in the Parish of Compton, otherwise Compton Beauchamp, in the County of Berks.
Houghton Inclosure Act 1794	34 Geo. 3. c. 72 Pr.	23 May 1794
An Act for dividing and allotting the Open and Uninclosed Fields, Downs, Commons, and other Open and Commonable Lands and Grounds, within the Manor of Houghton, in the Parish of Houghton, in the County of Southampton.
Feliskirk and Sutton Inclosure Act 1794	34 Geo. 3. c. 73 Pr.	23 May 1794
An Act for dividing and inclosing the Commons or Moors and Waste Grounds, within the Townships of Feliskirk and Sutton under Whitstoncliffe, in the Parish of Feliskirk, in the North Riding of the County of York.
Tolpuddle Inclosure Act 1794	34 Geo. 3. c. 74 Pr.	23 May 1794
An Act for dividing and allotting the Open, Uninclosed, and Commonable Lands and Grounds, within the Manor of Tolpudle in the County of Dorset.
Lamport and Hanging Houghton Inclosure Act 1794	34 Geo. 3. c. 75 Pr.	23 May 1794
An act for dividing and inclosing the open and common fields, common meadows, and common pastures, within the several manors or districts of Lamport and Hanging Houghton, in the parish of Lamport, in the county of Northampton.
Akely-cum-Stockholt Inclosure Act 1794	34 Geo. 3. c. 76 Pr.	23 May 1794
An Act for dividing and inclosing the Open and Common Fields and Meadows, Common Pastures, and other Commonable Lands and Grounds, within the Parish of Akely cum Stockholt, in the County of Buckingham.
Skillington Inclosure Act 1794	34 Geo. 3. c. 77 Pr.	23 May 1794
An Act to divide, improve, allot, and inclose, the Open Fields, Meadows, Commons, Heath Grounds, and other Open and Uninclosed Lands, in the Parish of Skillington, in the County of Lincoln, and also certain Parts of a Common or Heath Ground, called The Intercommon, within or adjoining to the same.
Arnesby Inclosure Act 1794	34 Geo. 3. c. 78 Pr.	23 May 1794
An Act for dividing and inclosing the Open and Common Fields, Common Meadows, Common Pastures, and other Commonable Lands and Grounds, in the Parish of Arnesby, in the County of Leicester.
Belton Inclosure Act 1794	34 Geo. 3. c. 79 Pr.	23 May 1794
An Act for dividing, inclosing, and improving, the Open and Common Fields, Meadows, Pastures, and other Commonable Lands and Grounds, within the Manor or Lordship of Belton, in the County of Rutland.
Pillerton Hersey Inclosure Act 1794	34 Geo. 3. c. 80 Pr.	23 May 1794
An act for dividing and inclosing the open common fields, meadows, and pastures, and other commonable lands and waste grounds, within Lower Pillarton, otherwise Nether Pillarton, otherwise Pillardington, in the county of Warwick.
Crawley and Bishops Sutton Inclosure Act 1794	34 Geo. 3. c. 81 Pr.	23 May 1794
An Act for dividing, allotting, and inclosing, divers Common Fields, Common Woods, Common Downs, and other Commonable Places, within the Manor and Parish of Crawley, in the County of Southampton, and of certain Open Common Fields, Common Meadows, Waste Lands, and other Commonable Places, within the Parish of Bishops Sutton, in the said County.
Wolvey Inclosure Act 1794	34 Geo. 3. c. 82 Pr.	23 May 1794
An Act for dividing and inclosing the Common and Open Fields, Wolds, Common, and Waste Ground, within the Parish of Wolvey, in the County of Warwick.
Martin Inclosure Act 1794	34 Geo. 3. c. 83 Pr.	23 May 1794
An Act for allotting and inclosing the Fields, Moors, and Waste Lands, within the Hamlet of Martin, in the Parish of Timberland, in the County of Lincoln.
Mold Inclosure (Amendment) Act 1794	34 Geo. 3. c. 84 Pr.	23 May 1794
An act to amend an act, paffed in the thirty-second year of the reign of his present Majesty, (Note: Mold Inclosure Act 1792 (32 Geo. 3. c. 54 Pr.)) for dividing, allotting, and inclosing, the commons and waste lands, within the manor and parish of Mold, in the county of Flint.
Shouldham and Shouldham Thorpe (Norfolk) Inclosure Act 1794	34 Geo. 3. c. 85 Pr.	23 May 1794
An act for dividing, allotting, and inclosing, the common fields, half year lands, lammas meadows, commons, and waste lands, within the parishes of Shouldham and Shouldham Thorpe, otherwise Garboise Thorpe, in the county of Norfolk.
Newport Pagnell Inclosure Act 1794	34 Geo. 3. c. 86 Pr.	23 May 1794
An Act for dividing and inclosing the Lands and Grounds lying and being in a certain Open and Common Field, called Port Field, in the Parish of Newport Pagnel, in the County of Buckingham.
Wellington Inclosure Act 1794	34 Geo. 3. c. 87 Pr.	23 May 1794
An Act for dividing, allotting, inclosing, and improving, the Commons, Common Meadows, and Common Fields, in the Parish of Wellington, in the County of Hereford; and for extinguishing the Right of Common upon certain Common Meadows within the said Parish.
Tushingham-cum-Grindley Inclosure Act 1794	34 Geo. 3. c. 88 Pr.	23 May 1794
An Act for dividing, allotting, draining, and inclosing, the Common and Waste Grounds, within the Manor and Township of Tushingham cum Grindley, in the Parish of Malpas, in the County of Chester.
New Sleaford and Quarrington Inclosure Act 1794	34 Geo. 3. c. 89 Pr.	23 May 1794
An Act for dividing and inclosing the Open Fields, Meadows, Pastures, Fens, Commonable and Waste Lands, in the Parish of New Sleaford, in the County of Lincoln, and in the Hamlet of Holdingham, within the said Parish, and in the Parish of Quarrington, in the said County.
South Newington Inclosure Act 1794	34 Geo. 3. c. 90 Pr.	23 May 1794
An act for dividing and inclosing the open and common fields, common meadows, common pastures, commons, waste, and other commonable lands and grounds, within the parish of Southnewington, otherwise Southnewton, in the county of Oxford.
Bottesford Inclosure Act 1794	34 Geo. 3. c. 91 Pr.	23 May 1794
An Act for dividing and inclosing the Open and Common Fields, Meadows, Pastures, and other Commonable Lands and Waste Grounds, in the Township of Bottesford, and Hamlet of Yaddlethorpe, in the Parish of Bottesford, in the County of Lincoln.
Althorpe Inclosure Act 1794	34 Geo. 3. c. 92 Pr.	23 May 1794
An Act for dividing and inclosing the Open Fields and Common, in the Township of Althorpe, in the County of Lincoln, and for draining the same, and certain inclosed Lands within the said Township.
Elmore, Brockworth, &c. Inclosure Act 1794	34 Geo. 3. c. 93 Pr.	23 May 1794
An Act for dividing, allotting, and laying in Severalty, the Open and Common Fields, Common Meadows, Common Pastures, and other Commonable and Waste Lands and Grounds, in the several Parishes of Elmore and Brockworth; and also for dividing, inclosing, and allotting, a certain Open and Common Field, called Calmsden Field, and other Commonable and Waste Lands, within the Manor of Calmsden, in the Parish of North Cerney, in the County of Gloucester.
Fleet Inclosure, &c. Act 1794	34 Geo. 3. c. 94 Pr.	23 May 1794
An Act for dividing, allotting, and inclosing, the Common Droves and Waste Lands, in the Parish of Fleet, in the County of Lincoln; and for altering an Act of Parliament, (Note: South Holland Drainage Act 1793 (33 Geo. 3. c. 109)) passed in the Thirty-third Year of the Reign of His present Majesty, for draining, preserving, and improving, certain Lands, lying in the several Parishes of Spalding (including the Hamlets of Cowbit and Peakill) Weston, Moulton, Whapload, Holbeach, Fleet, Gedney, Sutton Saint Mary, and Sutton Saint Nicholas, otherwise Lutton, all in South Holland, in the County of Lincoln.
Upton Grey Inclosure Act 1794	34 Geo. 3. c. 95 Pr.	23 May 1794
An act for dividing, allotting, and inclosing, the open and common fields, and waste lands within the common fields, in the parish of Upton Gray, in the county of Southampton.
Sutton Cheney Inclosure Act 1794	34 Geo. 3. c. 96 Pr.	23 May 1794
An Act for dividing and inclosing the Open Common Fields, Meadows, Pastures, Woodlands, Commons, and Waste Grounds, within the Township, Precincts, or Territories of Sutton Cheney, alias Sutton Chenell, in the Parish of Market Bosworth, in the County of Leicester.
Sutton in Ashfield Inclosure Act 1794	34 Geo. 3. c. 97 Pr.	23 May 1794
An Act for dividing and inclosing the several Commons and Waste Lands, within the Manor and Parish of Sutton in Ashfield, in the County of Nottingham.
Faldingworth Inclosure Act 1794	34 Geo. 3. c. 98 Pr.	23 May 1794
An Act for dividing and inclosing the Open Fields, Meadows, Pastures, Commons, and Waste Lands, within the Parish of Faldingworth, in the County of Lincoln.
Rufforth Inclosure Act 1794	34 Geo. 3. c. 99 Pr.	23 May 1794
An Act for dividing and inclosing the several Open Fields, Ings, Common and Waste Grounds, within the Parish of Rufforth, in the County of the City of York.
Baresby and South Croxton Inclosure Act 1794	34 Geo. 3. c. 100 Pr.	23 May 1794
An act for dividing, allotting, and inclosing, the open fields of Baresby and South Croxton, in the county of Leicester, and the open meadows and pastures, and other parcels of meadow and pasture land and commons, commonable places, and waste lands, used or enjoyed therewith.
South Witham Inclosure Act 1794	34 Geo. 3. c. 101 Pr.	23 May 1794
An Act for dividing and inclosing the Open and Common Fields, Meadows, Moors, Common Pastures, and Commonable Lands, and Waste Grounds, in the Parish of South Witham, in the County of Lincoln.
Ilkeston Inclosure Act 1794	34 Geo. 3. c. 102 Pr.	23 May 1794
An Act for dividing, allotting, and inclosing, the Open Fields, Meadows, Pastures, Commons, and Waste Lands, within the Parish of Ilkeston, in the County of Derby.
Thornton Inclosure Act 1794	34 Geo. 3. c. 103 Pr.	23 May 1794
An Act for dividing and inclosing the Open Fields, Heath, and other Commonable Lands and Grounds, in the Lordships or Liberties of Thornton and Bagworth, in the Parish of Thornton, in the County Leicester.
Thuillier's Naturalization Act 1794	34 Geo. 3. c. 104 Pr.	23 May 1794
An act for naturalizing John Thuillier.
Stirling's Estate Act 1794	34 Geo. 3. c. 105 Pr.	11 June 1794
An act for impowering the judges of the court of session in Scotland to sell such parts of the lands and barony of Renton, in the county of Berwick, formerly belonging to sir Alexander Stirling, late of Glorat, baronet, now deceased, and now descending to sir John Stirling of Glorat, baronet, his son, as may be sufficient to pay off the debts affecting the said lands and barony.
Bishop of Litchfield and Sir Richard Hill's Exchange Act 1794	34 Geo. 3. c. 106 Pr.	11 June 1794
An act for effectuating an exchange between James lord bishop of Litchfield and Coventry and sir Richard Hill baronet.
Sebright's Estate Act 1794	34 Geo. 3. c. 107 Pr.	11 June 1794
An act for effecting a settlement of the freehold and copyhold estates of dame Harriot the wife of sir John Saunders Sebright baronet, late Harriot Croftes spinster, pursuant to articles executed previous to their marriage, notwithstanding the infancy of the said dame Harriot Sebright.
Pease's Estate Act 1794	34 Geo. 3. c. 108 Pr.	11 June 1794
An act to enable Joseph Robinson Pease esquire and Anne his wife, and Robert Copeland Pease esquire, and the guardians of the children of the said Joseph Robinson Pease and Robert Copeland Pease, respectively, during their minority, to grant building leases of certain messuages, mills, lands, grounds, tenements, and hereditaments, in, the town and county of the town of Kingston upon Hull, and in the parishes of Sculcoates and Drypool, in the county of York.
Bishop of Ely's Estate Act 1794	34 Geo. 3. c. 109 Pr.	11 June 1794
An act to enable the honourable and right reverend James lord bishop of Ely, and his successors, to grant, by several leases, an estate in the Isle of Ely, now held under one lease.
Rector of Clapham (Surrey) Act 1794	34 Geo. 3. c. 110 Pr.	11 June 1794
An act to enable the rector of the parish and parish church of Clapham, in the county of Surrey, for the time being, to grant leases of the glebe belonging to the said rectory.
Lane's Estate Act 1794	34 Geo. 3. c. 111 Pr.	11 June 1794
An act to enable Thomas Lane esquire, to grant building, repairing, and improving leases of estates, devised to him by Henry Bosville esquire, deceased, in the counties of Kent, Essex, Sussex, and Surrey.
Lund Inclosure Act 1794	34 Geo. 3. c. 112 Pr.	11 June 1794
An act for dividing and inclosing the open fields, pastures, commons, and wastes, within the township of Lund, in the parish of Lund, in the east riding of the county of York, and for making a compensation in lieu of the tythes thereof, and of the lands already inclosed in the same township.
Corse Inclosure Act 1794	34 Geo. 3. c. 113 Pr.	11 June 1794
An act for dividing and inclosing the open and common fields, common meadows, common pastures, and other commonable lands, within the parish of Corse, in the county of Gloucester.
Rucker's Naturalization Act 1794	34 Geo. 3. c. 114 Pr.	7 July 1794
An act for naturalizing John Anthony Rucker.

=== Sources ===
- Pickering, Danby, ed. (1794). "Anno regni tricesimo quarto Georgii III". The Statutes at Large. Vol. 39. Archdeacon & Burges. pp. 409–721 – via Google Books.
- Pickering, Danby, ed. (1794). "Anno regni tricesimo quarto Georgii III". The Statutes at Large. Vol. 39. Archdeacon & Burges. pp. 409–721 – via Internet Archive.
- Journals of the House of Commons. Vol. 49. London: His Majesty's Stationery Office. 1803. pp. 3–745 – via Google Books.
- Chronological Table of and Index to the Statutes. Vol. 1: To the End of the Session 59 Vict. Sess. 2 (1895) (13th ed.). London: Her Majesty's Stationery Office. 1896. pp. 154–156 – via Google Books.

== See also ==
- List of acts of the Parliament of Great Britain
