= Lewis Hertslet =

Lewis Hertslet (1787–1870) was an English librarian and editor of state papers.

== Life ==
He was the eldest son of Jean Louis Pierre Hertslett (or Hiertzelet), a Swiss king's messenger who had migrated to Great Britain, born in November 1787. He entered the Civil Service, and on 5 February 1801 was appointed sub-librarian in the Foreign Office; and on 6 January 1810 librarian and keeper of the papers.

Hertslet was one of the two secretaries of the lords justices in England while George IV was absent in Hanover in 1821. He remained librarian till 20 November 1857, when he retired on a pension. He died at his house, No.16, Great College Street, Westminster, on 16 March 1870.

== Works ==
Hertslet wrote:

- A Complete Collection of the Treaties and Conventions at present subsisting between Great Britain and Foreign Powers, so far as they relate to Commerce and Navigation, to the Repression and Abolition of the Slave Trade, and to the Privileges and Interests of the Subjects of the high contracting Powers, 2 vols., 1820.
- A Complete Collection of the Treaties and Conventions and reciprocal Relations subsisting between Great Britain and Foreign Powers, and of the Laws, Decrees, and Orders in Council concerning the same, 16 vols., of which the first 11 are by Hertslet, and the rest by his son Edward.
- Treaties, &c., between Turkey and Foreign Powers, 1835–55 (privately printed 1855).

== Family ==
Hertslet married Hannah Harriet, daughter of George Cooke of Westminster. His youngest son, Edward (1824–1902) succeeded him as librarian at the Foreign Office.

== Notes ==
Attribution

This article incorporates text from a publication now in the public domain: Stephen, Leslie; Lee, Sidney, eds. (1891). "Hertslet, Lewis". Dictionary of National Biography. Vol. 26. London: Smith, Elder & Co.
