= Mount Bergne =

Mountain in Alberta, Canada

- Location within Alberta

Highest point
- Elevation: 3,176 m (10,420 ft)
- Prominence: 162 m (531 ft)
- Parent peak: Solitaire Mountain (3300 m)
- Listing: Mountains of Alberta
- Coordinates: 51°45′42″N 116°51′58″W

Geography
- Country: Canada
- Province: Alberta
- Protected area: Banff National Park
- Parent range: Freshfields Ranges; Park Ranges
- Topo map: NTS 82N15 Mistaya Lake

Climbing
- First ascent: 1922 by M.M. Strumia, Edward Feuz jr.

Mount Bergne is a summit in Banff National Park, Alberta, Canada.

The mountain was named in memory of Frank Bergne, a mountain climber who had died in a climbing accident in 1907.

== See also ==
- List of mountains in the Canadian Rockies
