= Sebastian Bergne =

British industrial designer

- Bergne in 2026
- Born: 1966 (age 59–60)
- Education: Bedales School, Royal College of Art
- Occupation: Designer
- Website: sebastianbergne.shop

Sebastian Bergne (born 1966) is a British industrial designer. He has designed consumer products, lighting, furniture, kitchenware, and tableware for companies such as Luceplan, Pierre Frey, Tolix, Driade, Tefal, Muji, De Beers, and Vitra.

Bergne graduated from The Royal College of Art in 1990. He has spoken about how childhood dyslexia influenced his education and career choices.

Collections holding examples of his work include those of the Museum of Modern Art in New York, the Design Museum in London, the Museé des Arts Décoratifs in Paris, the Cooper Hewit in New York and the Olympic Museum in Lausanne. His work has also received international design awards such as Red Dot, Design Plus, and the iF Product Design Award.

Bergne designed pieces for Point Two Five at the London Design Festival 2024.

== Gallery ==
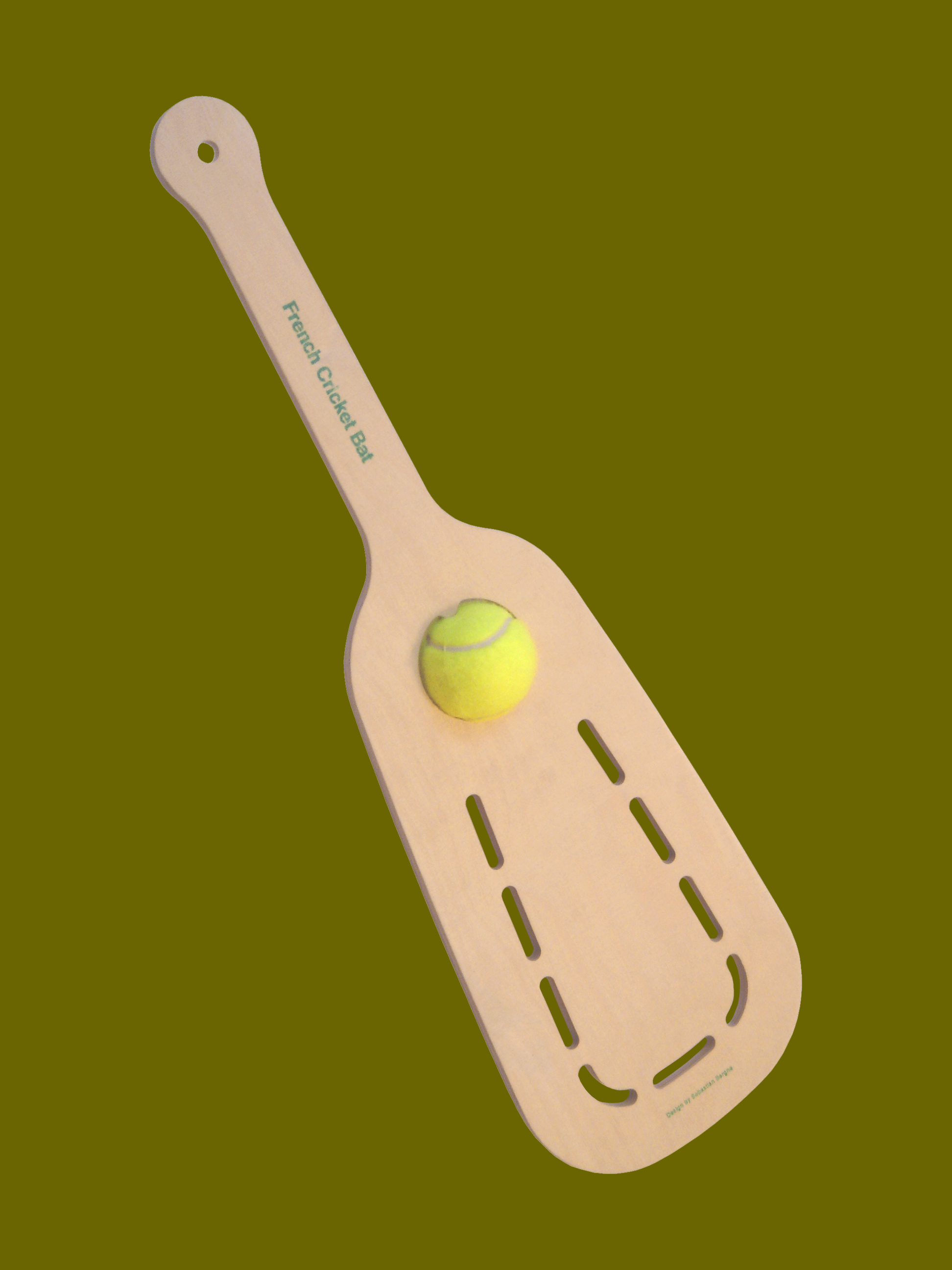
French cricket bat by Bergne
