= John Brodribb Bergne =

English official and numismatist

John Brodribb Bergne (1800–1873) was an English official, numismatist and antiquary.

== Life ==
Bergne was born at Kensington, and entered the Foreign Office in January 1817. He was attached as clerk to the treaty department, of which he became superintendent in 1854. A trusted adviser of successive secretaries of state, his reputation was as an authority on matters connected with treaties. In 1865 he was a member of the commission appointed to revise the slave trade instructions. He remained the head of the treaty department till his death, early in 1873.

== Numismatist ==
Bergne was also an antiquary and numismatist, one of the founders of the Numismatic Society, of which he was treasurer from 1848 to 1857, and then a vice-president, He was fellow of the Society of Antiquaries of London. As a numismatist, Bergne concentrated on Roman and English coins, his collection of which was dispersed at his death, when many were purchased for the British Museum. The following are his contributions to the Numismatic Chronicle from its first publication in 1838:

- Pennies of William the Conqueror;
- Additions to Mr. Walpole's Account of the Family of Roetiers;
- Irish Penny of Edward I;
- Remarks on the Pennies of Henry with the Short and Long Cross;
- Half-crowns of Charles II of Uncertain Mints;
- Unpublished Exeter Half-crowns of Charles I;
- Numismatic Sermon preached in 1694;
- Unpublished Coins of Guthred, Baldred, and William the Conqueror;
- Coin of Cerausius of a New and Unpublished Type;
- Another coin of Baldred;
- Denarius of Pescenninus Niger;
- Coin Pedigrees;
- Unpublished Coins;
- Foreign or Counterfeit Sterlings.

== Family ==
Bergne's Naturalization Act 1794
- Act of Parliament
- Parliament of Great Britain
- Long title: An act for naturalizing John Bergne.
- Citation: 34 Geo. 3. c. 16 Pr.
- Territorial extent: Great Britain

Dates
- Royal assent: 28 March 1794
- Commencement: 21 January 1794 (Note: Start of session.)

Status: Current legislation

John Brodribb Bergne's father, Jean Bergne, was born in France c. 1765 and emigrated to England after the revolution. He naturalized as a British citizen (John Bergne) through a private act of Parliament, Bergne's Naturalization Act 1794 (34 Geo. 3. c. 16 Pr.) in March 1794, married Elizabeth Brodribb (a great great great aunt of Sir Henry Irving) in 1799, and died in 1807. The diplomat John Henry Gibbs Bergne was JBB's eldest son. JBB's younger brother was Henry Bergne, farmer and owner of the tannery in Woollard, Somerset.
